= 2020 Vanuatuan general election =

- 19–20 March 2020
- All 52 seats in Parliament; 27 seats needed for a majority
Party	Leader	Vote %	Seats	+/–
Leaders Party	Jothan Napat	12.49	5	+4
Vanua'aku Pati	Bob Loughman	12.12	7	+1
RMC	Charlot Salwai	11.32	7	+4
Land & Justice	Ralph Regenvanu	10.00	9	+2
UMP	Ishmael Kalsakau	7.67	5	−1
National United	Ham Lin̄i	4.17	4	0
Green Confederation	Moana Carcasses Kalosil	2.52	1	−1
Rural Development	Jay Ngwele	2.50	2	New
Liberal Movement	Gaetan Pikioune	2.19	1	New
Nagriamel	Keasipai Song	2.07	1	−2
Iauko Group	Harry Iauko	1.98	2	−2
People's Progressive	Sato Kilman	1.85	1	0
Vanuatu First	Russel Nari	1.47	1	New
National Development	Christophe Emelee	1.46	1	0
PUDP		1.30	1	New
Cultural Self-reliance	Samson Samsen	1.14	1	New
Vemarana		1.05	1	+1
NCM		0.90	1	New
Progressive Development		0.57	1	+1
This lists parties that won seats. See the complete results below.
Prime Minister before	Prime Minister after
Charlot Salwai; RMC	Bob Loughman; Vanua'aku Pati

General elections were held in Vanuatu on 19–20 March 2020. The elections were initially intended to be held on 19 March, but logistical problems resulted in some areas voting the following day.

== Electoral system ==
The 52 members of Parliament were elected from eight single-member constituencies and ten multi-member constituencies (of between two and seven seats) by first-past-the-post and single non-transferable vote, respectively.

== Campaign ==
The Vanua'aku Pati launched its campaign slogan 'Lets Rebuild Vanuatu' in June 2019 and endorsed the continuation of its Kambak ("come back") policy.

In October 2019, a 'Vot Woman' campaign was launched, supporting all female candidates and calling for guaranteed 50% representation for women in parliament. No women were elected in the 2012 or 2016 elections. There were around 15 female candidates, but none were elected. The youngest woman candidate in 2020 was Litiana Kalsrap.

An important issue was the future of the lucrative but controversial citizenship by investment, or “passport sales” programs. For a price of about US $150,000, these schemes allow applicants to become citizens in months, without setting foot in the country.

== Results ==
Although there were no confirmed cases of COVID-19 in the islands, there were concerns that fears of the pandemic could keep turnout low. Turnout at the previous election was about 57%.

Unofficial results were gradually released over the following days, with official results being announced later than usual, on 6 April, due to the death of the Chairman of the Vanuatu Electoral Commission, Martin Tete. No women were elected. Nineteen parties won one or more seats, with the Land and Justice Party becoming the largest with nine of the 52 seats. Turnout was down six percentage points from the prior elections in 2016.

Party	Votes	%	Seats	+/–
Leaders Party of Vanuatu	17,992	12.49	5	+4
Vanua'aku Pati	17,460	12.12	7	+1
Reunification Movement for Change	16,298	11.32	7	+4
Land and Justice Party	14,400	10.00	9	+2
Union of Moderate Parties	11,043	7.67	5	–1
National United Party	6,010	4.17	4	0
Green Confederation	3,623	2.52	1	–1
Rural Development Party	3,600	2.50	2	New
Vanuatu Liberal Movement	3,147	2.19	1	New
Nagriamel	2,980	2.07	1	–2
Vanuatu Labour Party	2,866	1.99	0	–1
Iauko Group	2,847	1.98	2	–2
People's Progressive Party	2,664	1.85	1	0
Vanuatu First Party	2,112	1.47	1	New
Vanuatu National Development Party	2,102	1.46	1	–1
People's Unity Development Party	1,870	1.30	1	New
Vanuatu Cultural Self-reliance Movement	1,637	1.14	1	New
Vemarana	1,506	1.05	1	+1
Ngwasoanda Custom Movement	1,300	0.90	1	New
Oceania Transformation Movement	1,252	0.87	0	New
The People's Party	1,232	0.86	0	New
Vanuatu Community Movement	1,028	0.71	0	New
Friend Melanesian Party	996	0.69	0	–1
Kia Koe Party	958	0.67	0	New
New Nation Party	901	0.63	0	New
Vanuatu Progressive Development Party	825	0.57	1	+1
Upi Nafzan Iskei	729	0.51	0	New
People's Services Party	700	0.49	0	–1
Vanuatu People's Alliance for Change	602	0.42	0	New
Natatok Indigenous People's Democratic Party	593	0.41	0	0
Vanuatu Progressive Republican Farmer Party	512	0.36	0	0
People's Democratic Party	505	0.35	0	New
National Party	448	0.31	0	0
Imaim	442	0.31	0	New
UCVP Party	436	0.30	0	New
Angai Tagaro	386	0.27	0	New
Melanesian Progressive Party	327	0.23	0	0
United Movements for Vanuatu People	315	0.22	0	New
Vanuatu Presidential Party	294	0.20	0	–1
Nodaru Masan Party	104	0.07	0	New
Shepherds Alliance Party	80	0.06	0	0
People's Action Party	77	0.05	0	0
Namaki Ahute Kastom Movement	71	0.05	0	New
People, Churches, Chiefs Party	70	0.05	0	New
Vanuatu Liberal Party	54	0.04	0	New
Movement for Righteousness, Justice and Peace	37	0.03	0	New
Vanuatu Peoples for Change Party	19	0.01	0	New
Vanuatu Reform Democratic Party	7	0.00	0	0
Independents	14,546	10.10	0	–8
Total	144,003	100.00	52	0
Valid votes	144,003	99.27		
Invalid/blank votes	1,061	0.73		
Total votes	145,064	100.00		
Registered voters/turnout	278,954	52.00		
Source: Vanuatu Electoral Office, Election Report

=== By constituency ===
Ambae
Candidate	Party	Votes	%
James Bule	People's Unity Development Party	597	14.93
John Still Tari Qetu	National United Party	582	14.56
Jay Ngwele	Rural Development Party	551	13.78
Alban Vui Garae	Leaders Party of Vanuatu	395	9.88
Alickson Vira	Angai Tagaro	386	9.65
Samson Toa	Leaders Party of Vanuatu	321	8.03
James Tari Bangalakua	Land and Justice Party	261	6.53
Jacob Mata	Nagriamel	197	4.93
Richard Mera	Vanua'aku Pati	162	4.05
Peter Vuta	Independent	148	3.70
Jameson Bani Gwero	People's Action Party	56	1.40
Joseph Mauri Joe Garaegesa	Union of Moderate Parties	54	1.35
George Tambe	Vanua'aku Pati	51	1.28
Steven Garaesani	Independent	50	1.25
Viratiro Remy Eugene	Reunification Movement for Change	49	1.23
Philimon Tari	Land and Justice Party	44	1.10
Joel Hubert Duvu	Vanuatu First Party	39	0.98
Hannah Liunakwalau	Leaders Party of Vanuatu	36	0.90
Robert Jay Hakwa Natugogona	Independent	12	0.30
Ronly Ala	Independent	7	0.18
Willie Kalo	Vanuatu First Party	0	0.00
Total		3,998	100.00
Valid votes		3,998	99.21
Invalid/blank votes		32	0.79
Total votes		4,030	100.00
Registered voters/turnout		9,969	40.43

Ambrym
Candidate	Party	Votes	%
John Salong	Land and Justice Party	1,172	27.77
Bruno Leingkone	National United Party	971	23.01
Albert Abel Williams	Vanua'aku Pati	746	17.68
Alilee Marokon	Reunification Movement for Change	518	12.27
Jimmy Andeng	Green Confederation	339	8.03
Jimmy Japeth	Nagriamel	218	5.17
Eddie Percy Etul	Leaders Party of Vanuatu	178	4.22
Arthur Peter Bae	Union of Moderate Parties	52	1.23
Hopa David Tungon Tiare	Independent	19	0.45
Naros Williamson Obed	Vanuatu Reform Democratic Party	7	0.17
Total		4,220	100.00
Valid votes		4,220	99.04
Invalid/blank votes		41	0.96
Total votes		4,261	100.00
Registered voters/turnout		7,027	60.64

Banks
Candidate	Party	Votes	%
Danny Silas	Land and Justice Party	1,091	32.77
Jack Wona	Vanuatu National Development Party	1,090	32.74
Shadrack Welegtabit	Leaders Party of Vanuatu	450	13.52
Dunstan Hilton	People's Progressive Party	356	10.69
Harry Benjamin Vanva	Vanuatu Labour Party	147	4.42
Talo Batholomew Weul	Oceania Transformation Movement	102	3.06
Wetas Victor	Kia Koe Party	93	2.79
Total		3,329	100.00
Valid votes		3,329	99.20
Invalid/blank votes		27	0.80
Total votes		3,356	100.00
Registered voters/turnout		5,095	65.87

Efate
Candidate	Party	Votes	%
Jack Norris Kalmet	Reunification Movement for Change	2,301	11.10
Pakoa Kaltonga	Leaders Party of Vanuatu	1,854	8.95
Gillion William	Land and Justice Party	1,800	8.68
Anatole Hymak	Vanuatu First Party	1,340	6.47
John Mark Ruben	Vanua'aku Pati	1,160	5.60
Lionel Nasome Kaluat	The People's Party	1,043	5.03
Edwin Kalorisu	Leaders Party of Vanuatu	1,017	4.91
Michel Taravaki	Vanuatu Liberal Movement	988	4.77
Eddy Kalokul	Leaders Party of Vanuatu	948	4.57
Roro Sambo	New Nation Party	901	4.35
Joshua Kalsakau	Vanuatu Labour Party	834	4.02
Ghislain Kaltack	Upi Nafzan Iskei	729	3.52
Takalo Tavimasoe	Vanua'aku Pati	706	3.41
John Iasu	Green Confederation	684	3.30
Alfred Rollan Carlot	Natatok	593	2.86
Stanley Kaltoi John	Vanua'aku Pati	589	2.84
Philip Fanne	Union of Moderate Parties	511	2.47
Rolland Pierre	Vanuatu Labour Party	507	2.45
Graham Nalpini	Independent	397	1.92
Jean Pierre Serel	Independent	369	1.78
Seretangi Kalsakau	Reunification Movement for Change	361	1.74
Johnston Tau	Independent	248	1.20
Teni Kalmet	United Movements for Vanuatu People	228	1.10
Ephraim Kalmet	People's Democratic Party	144	0.69
Henry Kaltang	Independent	113	0.55
Pierre Carlot	Melanesian Progressive Party	90	0.43
Litiana Kalsrap	Shepherds Alliance Party	79	0.38
Jack Pakoa	Oceania Transformation Movement	75	0.36
Alice Annies Athy	Independent	70	0.34
Hendon Kalsakau	Oceania Transformation Movement	47	0.23
Total		20,726	100.00
Valid votes		20,726	99.41
Invalid/blank votes		124	0.59
Total votes		20,850	100.00
Registered voters/turnout		44,385	46.98

Epi
Candidate	Party	Votes	%
John Roy Niel	Vanuatu Progressive Development Party	825	20.89
Seule Simeon	Reunification Movement for Change	782	19.80
Marcel Yona	Land and Justice Party	642	16.25
Issaac Daniel Tongolilu	Vanua'aku Pati	405	10.25
Billy Peter Ioan	Union of Moderate Parties	382	9.67
Mackin Rita Valia	Leaders Party of Vanuatu	350	8.86
Sammy Brown Niumataiwalu	Independent	225	5.70
Erick Moses	Iauko Group	169	4.28
Samuel Abel	Rural Development Party	121	3.06
Kalo John Mawa	Vanuatu Labour Party	35	0.89
Yonah Kalstap	Oceania Transformation Movement	11	0.28
Katrina Ulanim Keren William	Independent	3	0.08
Total		3,950	100.00
Valid votes		3,950	99.37
Invalid/blank votes		25	0.63
Total votes		3,975	100.00
Registered voters/turnout		5,666	70.16

Luganville
Candidate	Party	Votes	%
Seremiah Matai Nawalu	Leaders Party of Vanuatu	1,164	18.36
Marc Ati	Iauko Group	871	13.74
Donald Restutune	Reunification Movement for Change	844	13.31
Varidiu Jimmy Solomon	National United Party	701	11.06
Daniel Kalo Toara	Vanua'aku Pati	533	8.41
Rex Issachar	Independent	387	6.11
Pedro Boe Tanga	Vanuatu Cultural Self-reliance Movement	365	5.76
Basil Leodoro	Vanuatu Labour Party	319	5.03
Bruno Milliecon Taliban	Land and Justice Party	286	4.51
George Wells	Vanuatu Liberal Movement	258	4.07
Donald Hosea	Green Confederation	234	3.69
Harry Brownhill	Independent	167	2.63
Jean Tabibang	Nodaru Masan Party	81	1.28
James Nwango	Nagriamel	67	1.06
Nelly Caleb	Independent	47	0.74
Gordon John Arnambhat	Oceania Transformation Movement	15	0.24
Total		6,339	100.00
Valid votes		6,339	99.34
Invalid/blank votes		42	0.66
Total votes		6,381	100.00
Registered voters/turnout		16,523	38.62

Maewo
Candidate	Party	Votes	%
Ian Wilson	Ngwasoanda Custom Movement	1,300	64.20
Reynolds Boeleguriega Boeson	Independent	473	23.36
Elison Reveala	Vanua'aku Pati	225	11.11
Paul Allen Boe	Kia Koe Party	27	1.33
Total		2,025	100.00
Valid votes		2,025	96.34
Invalid/blank votes		77	3.66
Total votes		2,102	100.00
Registered voters/turnout		3,064	68.60

Malekula
Candidate	Party	Votes	%
Marcellino Barthelemy	Reunification Movement for Change	1,204	7.46
Esmon Saimon	Vanua'aku Pati	1,005	6.23
Gracia Shadrack	Leaders Party of Vanuatu	997	6.18
Sanick Asang	National United Party	989	6.13
Edmond Julun	Land and Justice Party	946	5.86
Sala John	Land and Justice Party	878	5.44
Francois Batick	Reunification Movement for Change	835	5.17
Sato Kilman	People's Progressive Party	784	4.86
Don Ken Stephen	People's Services Party	700	4.34
Wilford Patunvanu	Independent	660	4.09
Samuel Jack Menzies	Leaders Party of Vanuatu	604	3.74
Kaltalio Simeon	Vanua'aku Pati	568	3.52
Diana Meltek	Vanua'aku Pati	566	3.51
John Edwin Terry	Green Confederation	527	3.26
Niptic Andrew Willie Kal	Independent	514	3.18
Peter Manwo	Union of Moderate Parties	491	3.04
Jerome Ludvaune	Reunification Movement for Change	447	2.77
Malcekan Jeanno	UCVP Party	436	2.70
Paul Robert Ravun	Independent	306	1.90
Stephen Shing	Independent	296	1.83
Max Kelly Albert	Leaders Party of Vanuatu	260	1.61
Jack Roy	People's Progressive Party	260	1.61
David Gibson	People's Unity Development Party	254	1.57
Anicet Faustin Maleb	Union of Moderate Parties	251	1.56
Ata Tony	Vanua'aku Pati	214	1.33
Sewere Jean Philip	Vanuatu Labour Party	177	1.10
Patunvanu Jenek	Nagriamel	175	1.08
Peter Onis	Union of Moderate Parties	160	0.99
Roger Veremaito	Independent	159	0.99
Daniel Nalet	Oceania Transformation Movement	99	0.61
Johnny Arnhambat	Independent	91	0.56
Raul Nemtenmat	Namaki Ahute Kastom Movement	71	0.44
Kisito Teilemb	People, Churches, Chiefs Party	70	0.43
Jules Nirambath	Kia Koe Party	51	0.32
Willy Apia Massing	Independent	29	0.18
Anselmo Tevanu	Independent	24	0.15
Julian Nethie Shadrack	Oceania Transformation Movement	22	0.14
Williams Aisen	Independent	21	0.13
Marcelino Gulgul Abong	Vanuatu Cultural Self-reliance Movement	0	0.00
Total		16,141	100.00
Valid votes		16,141	99.62
Invalid/blank votes		61	0.38
Total votes		16,202	100.00
Registered voters/turnout		25,228	64.22

Malo–Aore
Candidate	Party	Votes	%
Rasu Wesley	Vanua'aku Pati	1,334	48.88
Uri Warawara	Land and Justice Party	1,288	47.20
Kalfau Moli	Union of Moderate Parties	107	3.92
Solomon Verogio	Kia Koe Party	0	0.00
Total		2,729	100.00
Valid votes		2,729	99.49
Invalid/blank votes		14	0.51
Total votes		2,743	100.00
Registered voters/turnout		4,645	59.05

Paama
Candidate	Party	Votes	%
Andy Job Sam	Leaders Party of Vanuatu	289	34.12
Jesse Joe Dick	Vanua'aku Pati	216	25.50
Fred William Tasso	Vanuatu Labour Party	184	21.72
Glen Takau	Union of Moderate Parties	73	8.62
Philip Tom Waiwai	Vanuatu Liberal Movement	43	5.08
Mahit Tout John Avock	Reunification Movement for Change	33	3.90
Demis Lango Stanely Foifo	Kia Koe Party	9	1.06
Total		847	100.00
Valid votes		847	99.30
Invalid/blank votes		6	0.70
Total votes		853	100.00
Registered voters/turnout		1,533	55.64

Pentecost
Candidate	Party	Votes	%
Charlot Salwai	Reunification Movement for Change	1,070	10.90
Marc Melsul	Rural Development Party	1,043	10.63
Silas Bule	National United Party	990	10.09
Boe Reve Ephraim	Land and Justice Party	757	7.71
Francois Xavier Chani	Leaders Party of Vanuatu	738	7.52
Ham Lini	National United Party	720	7.33
George Baddeley Bogiri	Independent	712	7.25
Richard Walsh Leona	Vanua'aku Pati	681	6.94
Saltukro Jean Baptist	Independent	645	6.57
Barnabas Tabirupmel	Oceania Transformation Movement	489	4.98
Jean Paul Virelala Bulewak	Vanuatu First Party	459	4.68
Donald Wapack	Reunification Movement for Change	422	4.30
Obed Tabimwel	People's Unity Development Party	280	2.85
Salathiel Taribas	Land and Justice Party	202	2.06
John Tevi Selwyn	Rural Development Party	180	1.83
Enoch Bule Kendrith	Kia Koe Party	149	1.52
Norbet Sumsum	Oceania Transformation Movement	122	1.24
Gideon Tabius	Independent	60	0.61
Wreath Bule	Vanuatu Labour Party	32	0.33
Kenedy John Tabiaga	Kia Koe Party	28	0.29
McDonald Bule	National Party	20	0.20
Molbah Rolland	Oceania Transformation Movement	17	0.17
Total		9,816	100.00
Valid votes		9,816	98.63
Invalid/blank votes		136	1.37
Total votes		9,952	100.00
Registered voters/turnout		16,544	60.15

Port Vila
Candidate	Party	Votes	%
Ralph Regenvanu	Land and Justice Party	1,987	9.74
Ulrich Sumptoh	Reunification Movement for Change	1,819	8.92
Ishmael Kalsakau	Union of Moderate Parties	1,581	7.75
Harry Anthony	Union of Moderate Parties	1,466	7.19
Kenneth Natapei	Vanua'aku Pati	1,255	6.15
Stephen Dorrick Felix	Leaders Party of Vanuatu	1,159	5.68
Robert Bohn Sikol	Green Confederation	1,089	5.34
Jean Pierre Nirua	Reunification Movement for Change	991	4.86
Joseph Matou Sowany	Independent	889	4.36
Nadia Kanegai	Independent	858	4.21
Donald Palaud	Union of Moderate Parties	688	3.37
Reginal Garoleo	National United Party	633	3.10
Ligo Joe Wilson	Leaders Party of Vanuatu	591	2.90
Ephraim Kalsakau	Vanuatu Labour Party	584	2.86
George Jonathan Mael Toka	Independent	572	2.80
Donald Shadrack	National Party	428	2.10
Kalopo Seule Kalo	Independent	411	2.01
Nigel Quai	Independent	395	1.94
David Manlau	Vanuatu People's Alliance for Change	373	1.83
Joel Langlois	People's Democratic Party	361	1.77
Levi Tarosa	Independent	324	1.59
Thomson Pakoa	People's Unity Development Party	317	1.55
Himford Luo Wendy	Union of Moderate Parties	226	1.11
Daniel Philips Obed	The People's Party	189	0.93
Barak Sopé	Melanesian Progressive Party	181	0.89
Derek Alexander	Independent	179	0.88
Anne Leimala Pakoa Tau	Independent	158	0.77
George Borugu	Independent	136	0.67
Terry Kapah	People's Progressive Party	123	0.60
Jerry Moli Tamata	Nagriamel	71	0.35
Graham Tabirap	Oceania Transformation Movement	68	0.33
Christopher Joseph Kernot	Kia Koe Party	65	0.32
David Tosul	Melanesian Progressive Party	56	0.27
Obed Robert Diniro	Vanuatu Liberal Party	54	0.26
Markson Max Nibtik	Independent	44	0.22
Daniel Molisa	Movement for Righteousness, Justice and Peace	37	0.18
Marie Joseph Kalkoa	Independent	29	0.14
Manina Juanita Packete	Oceania Transformation Movement	12	0.06
Total		20,399	100.00
Valid votes		20,399	99.41
Invalid/blank votes		122	0.59
Total votes		20,521	100.00
Registered voters/turnout		51,831	39.59

Santo
Candidate	Party	Votes	%
Mahe Rick Tchamako	Reunification Movement for Change	2,900	12.25
Gaetan Pikinoune	Vanuatu Liberal Movement	1,858	7.85
Alfred Maoh	Land and Justice Party	1,572	6.64
Stevens Nano Fabiano	Vemarana	1,506	6.36
Samson Samsen	Vanuatu Cultural Self-reliance Movement	1,272	5.37
Leonard Joshua Pikioune	Nagriamel	1,204	5.09
Sakaes Lulu	People's Progressive Party	1,141	4.82
Bani Jocob	Leaders Party of Vanuatu	1,131	4.78
John Lum	Nagriamel	1,048	4.43
Livo Mele	Vanuatu Community Movement	1,028	4.34
Amblus Edwin Macreveth	Friend Melanesian Party	996	4.21
Warsal Ronald Kalmasei	Vanua'aku Pati	882	3.73
Ravu Breten	Union of Moderate Parties	737	3.11
Leon Katty Warsal	Union of Moderate Parties	710	3.00
Teviri Bule Cap Tabimel	Reunification Movement for Change	662	2.80
Charley Jean Vincent	Independent	598	2.53
Ravou Akii Kolomoule Jean	Vanuatu Progressive Republican Farmer Party	512	2.16
Vutilolo Ioan	Leaders Party of Vanuatu	483	2.04
Nevu Hosea Avock Rothui	Union of Moderate Parties	462	1.95
Collin Tavi	Independent	436	1.84
Langrere Manuel Garae	National United Party	424	1.79
Warlan Iavro	People's Unity Development Party	422	1.78
Jullian Varisipiti	Vanua'aku Pati	318	1.34
Arutape Johnathan Lavo	Vanuatu Presidential Party	294	1.24
Rocroc Silas	Vanuatu First Party	274	1.16
Seni Mao Tarvakavat	Independent	205	0.87
Moses Moli	Independent	152	0.64
Thomas Adnrina Klt Prasad	Oceania Transformation Movement	113	0.48
John Wesley Nev	Green Confederation	83	0.35
Judah Siba	Independent	62	0.26
Toa Voke Steven	Kia Koe Party	61	0.26
Marae Clarence	Oceania Transformation Movement	57	0.24
Timothy Ian Pune	Independent	30	0.13
Kouai John Wesley	Nodaru Masan Party	23	0.10
James Samuel Turket	People's Action Party	21	0.09
Total		23,677	100.00
Valid votes		23,677	99.56
Invalid/blank votes		105	0.44
Total votes		23,782	100.00
Registered voters/turnout		40,674	58.47

Shepherds
Candidate	Party	Votes	%
Willie Pakoa Satearoto	Green Confederation	344	39.31
John William Mata'ariki Timakata	Vanua'aku Pati	299	34.17
Baptiste Firiam	Leaders Party of Vanuatu	232	26.51
Total		875	100.00
Valid votes		875	98.98
Invalid/blank votes		9	1.02
Total votes		884	100.00
Registered voters/turnout		1,441	61.35

Southern Islands
Candidate	Party	Votes	%
Edward Nalyal Molou	Vanua'aku Pati	929	39.79
Tomker Netvunei	Reunification Movement for Change	805	34.48
Ben Leeshi	Leaders Party of Vanuatu	569	24.37
Simon Lovo Umah	Union of Moderate Parties	19	0.81
Ruth Diana Delarue	Kia Koe Party	13	0.56
Total		2,335	100.00
Valid votes		2,335	98.52
Invalid/blank votes		35	1.48
Total votes		2,370	100.00
Registered voters/turnout		4,105	57.73

Tanna
Candidate	Party	Votes	%
Jothan Napat	Leaders Party of Vanuatu	1,841	9.50
Emanuel Xavier Harry	Iauko Group	1,807	9.32
Robin Kapapa	Union of Moderate Parties	1,584	8.17
Andrew Solomon Napuat	Land and Justice Party	1,474	7.60
Johnny Koanapo	Vanua'aku Pati	1,431	7.38
Bob Loughman	Vanua'aku Pati	1,321	6.81
Nako Ianatom Natuman	Union of Moderate Parties	1,175	6.06
Nipo Jimmy Nanuman	Leaders Party of Vanuatu	1,135	5.86
James Noumeta	Independent	968	4.99
Niatu Jerry	Vanua'aku Pati	957	4.94
John Less Napuati	Rural Development Party	823	4.25
Noam Tom	Rural Development Party	741	3.82
Johnson Youse Simil	Vanua'aku Pati	505	2.61
Andrew Nampat Kausiama	Independent	467	2.41
Kapum Isso	Kia Koe Party	462	2.38
Iapson George Kuras	Imaim	438	2.26
Johnny Lavah Nauam	Independent	429	2.21
John Am Miliaki	Independent	389	2.01
George Ronald	Vanua'aku Pati	310	1.60
Faniku Mary Kaviamu	Independent	299	1.54
Kuahi Tom Iapsei	Green Confederation	264	1.36
John Enock Tafiku	Vanuatu People's Alliance for Change	229	1.18
Tom Gregoire Ionum	Reunification Movement for Change	148	0.76
William Nasak	Independent	91	0.47
Jaques Meriago Nauka	Independent	54	0.28
Joe Harry Karu	Vanuatu Labour Party	36	0.19
Luke Lotrick Iawilick	Imaim	4	0.02
Richard Namel	Oceania Transformation Movement	3	0.02
Total		19,385	100.00
Valid votes		19,385	99.15
Invalid/blank votes		166	0.85
Total votes		19,551	100.00
Registered voters/turnout		35,857	54.52

Tongoa
Candidate	Party	Votes	%
Kalo Willie	Union of Moderate Parties	314	26.45
Jack Paul	Leaders Party of Vanuatu	277	23.34
Fred Lui Masoerangi Berry	Rural Development Party	141	11.88
Charley Robert	Reunification Movement for Change	107	9.01
Albert Willie Karlosaruru	Vanua'aku Pati	92	7.75
Noel Bong Willie	United Movements for Vanuatu People	87	7.33
John Fiji Ben	Independent	65	5.48
Sandy Lolos	Independent	54	4.55
Rory Richard	Green Confederation	49	4.13
Alice Kaloran	Shepherds Alliance Party	1	0.08
Total		1,187	100.00
Valid votes		1,187	99.50
Invalid/blank votes		6	0.50
Total votes		1,193	100.00
Registered voters/turnout		2,401	49.69

Torres
Candidate	Party	Votes	%
Christophe Emelee	Vanuatu National Development Party	1,012	49.98
Morris Manmelin Sogovman	Leaders Party of Vanuatu	973	48.05
Henry Nelson Nin	Vanuatu Peoples for Change Party	19	0.94
Clifton Ray Lonsdale	Vanuatu Labour Party	11	0.54
Basil Hopkin	Green Confederation	10	0.49
Total		2,025	100.00
Valid votes		2,025	98.40
Invalid/blank votes		33	1.60
Total votes		2,058	100.00
Registered voters/turnout		2,966	69.39

== Aftermath ==
Due to the delay in announcing the official results, Parliament was unable to meet for its first sitting within the normal period of 21 days after the election, and instead met for the first time on 20 April. During the first meeting, Gracia Shadrack of the Leaders Party of Vanuatu was elected Speaker. Bob Loughman of the Vanua'aku Pati was elected Prime Minister, defeating former foreign minister Ralph Regenvanu of the Land and Justice Party by 31 votes to 21. Loughman's coalition government included the Vanua'aku Pati, the Union of Moderate Parties, the National United Party and other minor parties. The next day Loughman appointed the members of his government.

Portfolio	Member	Party
Prime Minister	Bob Loughman	Vanua'aku Pati
Deputy Prime Minister; Minister for Internal Affairs	Ishmael Kalsakau	Union of Moderate Parties
Minister for Agriculture, Livestock, Forestry, Fisheries and Biosecurity	Kalo Willie	Union of Moderate Parties
Minister of Climate Change	Bruno Lengkon	National United Party
Minister of Education and Training	Seule Simeon	Reunification Movement for Change
Minister of Finance and Economic Management	Johnny Koanapo	Vanua'aku Pati
Minister of Foreign Affairs and External Trade	Mark Ati	Iauko Group
Minister of Health	Silas Bule	National United Party
Minister of Infrastructure and Public Utilities	Jay Ngwele	Rural Development Party
Minister of Justice and Community Services	Esmon Simon	Vanua'aku Pati
Minister of Land and Natural Resources	Norris Kalmet	Reunification Movement for Change
Ministry of Tourism, Trade, Commerce and Ni-Vanuatu Business	James Bule	People's Unity Development Party
Minister of Youth Development and Training	Willie Saetearoto	Green Confederation

== Subsequent by-elections ==
=== 2021 Pentecost by-election ===
Caused by the conviction of incumbent Charlot Salwai for perjury. He was pardoned by President Tallis Obed Moses, allowing him to run for the seat. The election was held on 8 October 2021. It was won by Sumptoh Blaise Tabisurin of the Rural Development Party.

Candidate	Party	Votes	%
Sumptoh Blaise Tabisurin	Rural Development Party	2,756	31.75
Charlot Salwai	Reunification Movement for Change	2,473	28.49
George Baddeley Bongiri	Independent	885	10.19
Joseph Tabirap	National United Party	748	8.62
Saltukro Jean Batist Saka	Independent	619	7.13
Ham Lini Vanuaroroa	Independent	531	6.12
Francois Xavier Chani	Independent	461	5.31
Sumsum Norbert	Unity Movement for Vanuatu People	187	2.15
Jean Pascal Saltukro	Reunification Movement for Change	21	0.24
Total		8,681	100.00
Valid votes		8,681	98.61
Invalid/blank votes		122	1.39
Total votes		8,803	100.00
Registered voters/turnout		18,587	47.36
Majority		283	3.26
Rural Development gain from RMC			
Source: Vanuatu Electoral Office

== See also ==
- List of members of the Parliament of Vanuatu (2020–2022)
