= List of members of the Parliament of Vanuatu (2020–2022) =

The 52 members of the Parliament of Vanuatu were elected on 19–20 March 2020.

== List of members ==
Constituency	Member	Party
Ambae	James Bule	People Unity Development Party
Ambae	John Still Tari Qetu	National United Party
Ambae	Jay Ngwele	Rural Development Party
Ambrym	John Dahmasing Salong	Land and Justice Party
Ambrym	Bruno Leingkone	National United Party
Banks	Danny Silas	Land and Justice Party
Efate	Norris Kalmet	Reunification Movement for Change
Efate	Kalkatoa Bakoa Maraki	Leaders Party of Vanuatu
Efate	Gillion William	Land and Justice Party
Efate	Hymak Anatole	Vanuatu First Party
Efate	Ruben John Mark	Vanua'aku Pati
Epi	John Roy Nil	Vanuatu Progressive Development Party
Epi	Seoule Simeon	Reunification Movement for Change
Luganville (2 seats)	Seremaia Matai	Leaders Party of Vanuatu
Luganville (2 seats)	Marc Ati	Iauko Group
Malo–Aore	Rasu Wesley	Vanua'aku Pati
Malekula	Marcellino Barthelemy	Reunification Movement for Change
Malekula	Esmon Saimon	Vanua'aku Pati
Malekula	Gracia Chadrack	Leaders Party of Vanuatu
Malekula	Sanick Asang	National United Party
Malekula	Edmond Julun	Land and Justice Party
Malekula	Sala John	Land and Justice Party
Malekula	Francois Batick	Reunification Movement for Change
Maewo	Ian Wilson	Ngwasoanda Custom Movement
Paama	Andy Job Sam	Leaders Party of Vanuatu
Pentecost (4 seats)	Charlot Salwai	Reunification Movement for Change
Pentecost (4 seats)	Marc Melsul	Rural Development Party
Pentecost (4 seats)	Silas Bule	National United Party
Pentecost (4 seats)	Boe Reve Ephraim	Land and Justice Party
Port Vila (5 seats)	Ralph Regenvanu	Land and Justice Party
Port Vila (5 seats)	Ulrich Sumptoh	Reunification Movement for Change
Port Vila (5 seats)	Ishmael Kalsakau	Union of Moderate Parties
Port Vila (5 seats)	Harry Anthony	Union of Moderate Parties
Port Vila (5 seats)	Kenneth Natapei	Vanua'aku Pati
Santo (7 seats)	Rick Mahe Tchamako	Reunification Movement for Change
Santo (7 seats)	Gaetan Pikioune	Vanuatu Liberal Movement
Santo (7 seats)	Alfred Maoh	Land and Justice Party
Santo (7 seats)	Stevens Nano Fabiano	Vemarana
Santo (7 seats)	Samson Samsen	Vanuatu Cultural Self-reliance Movement
Santo (7 seats)	Pikoune Joshua Leonard	Nagriamel
Santo (7 seats)	Sakaes Lulu	People's Progressive Party
Shepherds	Seteaoto Willie Pakoa	Green Confederation
Southern Islands	Edward Nalyal Molou	Vanua'aku Pati
Tanna	Jothan Napat	Leaders Party of Vanuatu
Tanna	Emanuel Harry Xavier	Iauko Group
Tanna	Robin Kapapa	Union of Moderate Parties
Tanna	Andrew Solomon Napuat	Land and Justice Party
Tanna	Johnny Kaonapo	Vanua'aku Pati
Tanna	Bob Loughman	Vanua'aku Pati
Tanna	Nako Ianatom Natuman	Union of Moderate Parties
Tongoa	Willie Kalo	Union of Moderate Parties
Torres	Christophe Emelee	Vanuatu National Development Party
Source: VEO
