= List of members of the Parliament of Vanuatu (2016–2020) =

The 52 members of the Parliament of Vanuatu from 2016 to 2020 were elected on 22 January 2016.

== List of members ==
Constituency	Member	Party	Notes
Ambae	Jacob Mata	Nagriamel	
Ambae	Jay Ngwele	Iauko Group	
Ambae	Alickson Vira	Natatok	
Ambrym	Bruno Leingkone	National United Party	
Ambrym	Albert Abel Williams	Land and Justice Party	
Banks	Jack Wona	Vanuatu National Development Party	
Efate	Norris Kalmet	Union of Moderate Parties	
Efate	Joshua Kalsakau	Vanuatu Labour Party	
Efate	Jerry Kanas	Independent	Died in June 2019. Edwin Kalorisu (LP) won the subsequent by-election
Efate	Nato Taiwia	Melanesian Progressive Party	Following an electoral petition in April 2016, Gillion William (GJP) was declared the winner after a recount and Taiwia removed from Parliament
Epi	Isaac Daniel Tongolilu	Independent	
Epi	Seoule Simeon	Union of Moderate Parties	
Luganville	Seremaia Matai	Independent	
Luganville	Marc Ati	Iauko Group	
Malekula	Sato Kilman	People's Progressive Party	
Malekula	Esmon Saimon	Vanua'aku Pati	
Malekula	Marcellino Barthelemy	Reunification Movement for Change	
Malekula	Don Ken Stephen	People's Services Party	
Malekula	Jerome Ladvaune	Union of Moderate Parties	
Malekula	Sala John	Land and Justice Party	
Malekula	Graci Chadrack	Independent	
Malo–Aore	Havo Molisale	Nagriamel	Died in February 2016. Uri Warawara (GJP) won the subsequent by-election
Maewo	Ian Wilson	Independent	
Paama	Fred William Tasso	Land and Justice Party	
Pentecost	Silas Bule Melve	National United Party	
Pentecost	Charlot Salwai	Reunification Movement for Change	
Pentecost	Francois Chani Tabisal	National United Party	
Pentecost	Ham Lin̄i	National United Party	
Port Vila	Kenneth Natapei	Vanua'aku Pati	
Port Vila	Ishmael Kalsakau	Union of Moderate Parties	
Port Vila	Ralph Regenvanu	Land and Justice Party	
Port Vila	Jean Pierre Nirua	Independent	
Port Vila	Kalo Seule	Green Confederation	
Port Vila	Ephraim Kalsakau	Independent	
Santo	Hosea Ovock Rothul Nevu	Iauko Group	
Santo	Alfred Maoh	Land and Justice Party	
Santo	Samson Samsen	Vanuatu Presidential Party	
Santo	Gaetan Pikioune	Nagriamel	
Santo	Rick Mahe Tchamako	Reunification Movement for Change	
Santo	Edwin Amblus Macreveth	Fren Melanesian Party	
Santo	Ronald Warsal Kalmasei	Vanua'aku Pati	
Shepherds	Toara Kalo Daniel	Green Confederation	
Southern Islands	Tomker Netvunei Naling	Union of Moderate Parties	
Tanna	Joe Natuman	Vanua'aku Pati	Removed from Parliament in May 2018. Jimmy Nipo (LP) won the subsequent by-election
Tanna	Jotham Napat	Leaders Party of Vanuatu	
Tanna	Bob Loughman	Vanua'aku Pati	
Tanna	Tom Noam Iouniwan	Independent	
Tanna	Nakou Natuman	Union of Moderate Parties	
Tanna	Johnny Koanapo Rasou	Vanua'aku Pati	
Tanna	Andrew Solomon Napuat	Land and Justice Party	
Tongoa	Kalo Pakoa Songi Lano	Iauko Group	
Torres	Christophe Emelee	Vanuatu National Development Party	
Source: Parliament
