= 2016 Vanuatuan general election =

- 22 January 2016
- All 52 seats in Parliament; 26 seats needed for a majority
Party	Leader	Vote %	Seats	+/–
Vanua'aku Pati	Joe Natuman	11.91	6	−2
UMP	Serge Vohor	9.73	6	+1
Land & Justice	Ralph Regenvanu	7.10	7	+3
National United	Ham Lin̄i	5.76	4	0
People's Progressive	Sato Kilman	4.84	1	−5
Iauko		4.40	4	+1
National Development	Christophe Emelee	4.37	2	New
Presidential	Louis Kalnpel	3.74	1	+1
Nagriamel	Moli Abel Nako	3.65	3	0
RMC	Charlot Salwai	3.44	3	0
Natatok	Alfred Carlot	2.67	1	−1
Green Confederation	Moana Carcasses Kalosil	2.52	2	−1
Leaders Party	Jothan Napat	2.17	1	New
Labour		1.57	1	+1
Friend Melanesian		1.30	1	+1
People's Services		0.91	1	0
Independents		18.49	8	+4
This lists parties that won seats. See the complete results below.
Prime Minister before	Prime Minister after
Sato Kilman; People's Progressive	Charlot Salwai; RMC

General elections were held in Vanuatu on 22 January 2016. The previous elections occurred in October 2012. The president of Vanuatu, Baldwin Lonsdale, dissolved the Parliament of Vanuatu in November 2015. This occurred after the conviction of 14 parliamentarians for bribery. The convicted MPs include former Prime Ministers Serge Vohor and Moana Carcasses Kalosil. The president called for a snap election to form a new government.

== Background ==
Vanuatu has a unicameral parliament with 52 Members of Parliament. The people elect their members by voting for one candidate. In multi-member constituencies, Vanuatu uses the single non-transferable vote system and in single-member districts, first-past-the-post voting is used. Each parliamentarian holds office for a term of 4 years. In Vanuatu, there are eight single-member districts and nine multi-seat constituencies. The district magnitude of multi-seat constituencies has a range of two members to seven members for each constituency. Citizens elect the President of Vanuatu and the government elects the Prime Minister of Vanuatu.

Historically, the Vanuatuan government and society divided itself along linguistic lines. The Vanua'aku Party represented the Anglophone interests and the Union of Moderate Parties represented the Francophone interests. Over time the linguistic divide has diminished as Vanuatu established a stronger national identity post-independence. Party allegiances have become less strong as factions split and formed new political parties.

In recent years more than 30 parties have won seats in the Vanuatuan parliament. A ruling government needs to have a majority of parliamentarians to pass legislation and effectively rule. Consequently, coalitions are necessary to govern in Vanuatu. Coalitions often struggle to find a common legislative agenda to lead the nation which can be a cause of political instability. Following the 2012 Vanuatu election, there were five successive Cabinets of Vanuatu which were either formed after votes of no-confidence or after members had deserted the cabinet for the opposition.

Clientelism has been a problem in Vanuatuan politics since the country's independence in 1980. Often the lines between clientelism and corruption in Vanuatu have been ill-defined. The successful conviction of 14 MPs, including two former prime ministers, for bribery was one of the largest steps taken to combat corruption. The Supreme Court found that while in the opposition in 2014, former prime minister Moana Carcasses Kalosil bribed parliamentarians with 35 million vatu (US$300,000) to support a no-confidence motion. He then became deputy Prime Minister in Sato Kilman's Cabinet. The court convicted Carcasses and the other 13 parliamentarians, including the Speaker Marcellino Pipite, for offering and receiving bribes; they sentenced the MPs in November 2015 to three years in jail and banned them from public office for 10 years. As this verdict was delivered while President Lonsdale was out of the country, the speaker assumed the role of the president and issued pardons for all involved including himself. Lonsdale overturned the pardons when he returned to Vanuatu the following day. As several of the convicted parliamentarians were members of the Cabinet of Vanuatu, Prime Minister Sato Kilman was unable to effectively rule. Kilman was not able to form a new government - nearly 1/3 of MPs were in jail - which led to governmental gridlock causing the Parliament to be dissolved by the president. The traditional chiefs of Vanuatu - the Malvatumauri - called for calm during this process and asked that the people allow for the legal process to unfold, suggesting that their power is mostly ceremonial and is limited politically. Following this failure to form a new government, Lonsdale called a snap election for 22 January 2016.

== Campaign ==
The official campaign began on 5 January 2016. A total of 261 candidates contested the elections, including 68 independents and 193 representing 36 political parties. The convicted MPs were not permitted to run as one cannot run for office in Vanuatu if they have a criminal conviction. Candidates who could afford to pay for airtime dominated mainstream media during the campaign; social media played an important role in this election. Only 10 women contested seats in this election and youth engagement in the campaign and election appears to have increased from 2012 but remained low.

== Conduct ==
Polls opened throughout the country on 22 January at 7:30AM and closed at 4:30PM. To facilitate high turnout levels, the government declared the day a public holiday. Schools, churches and other public centers transformed into polling stations. The Commonwealth and the Melanesian Spearhead Group observed the election to ensure electoral integrity.

Both groups of international observers remarked that turnout was low. The process of voting in Vanuatu works as follows: People who are 18 and above can vote if they have a voter card. The details are verified twice with the citizen then given an envelope with a sheet with the name, picture and political party symbol on a piece of paper. Each candidate had a different colored sticky paper attachment. In the voting booth, the voter identifies their preferred candidate, rips off the corresponding piece of paper and puts it into the envelope. The envelope is then dropped into a ballot box. The voter then retrieves their voter card and their thumb is inked. Voters are also able to proxy vote for two others while they cast their own vote.

The election day was peaceful and orderly. Voters headed to the polls early. Women and youth turned out to vote in high numbers. The conduct at polling stations did not vary around the country, suggesting relatively sufficient following of electoral rules.

After the polls closed at 4:30PM, the workers at the polling stations counted the ballots. As Vanuatu employs the first-past-the-post system and the single non-transferable vote system, the process of counting the votes was straightforward. Each candidate's number of votes were tallied and sent to the independently run Vanuatu Electoral Commission who announced the winners for each parliamentary seat.

The Electoral Integrity Project, an academic group that aims to quantify the integrity of elections worldwide, studied Vanuatu's 2016 election. By asking experts on Vanuatuan politics to rank the integrity of various electoral issues, the group found that the election was generally fair and just. However, they also suggest in their rankings that voters may have been bribed and that some may have received cash for votes. It was found likely that politicians offered patronage to voters, confirming at least some clientelism in Vanuatuan politics.

== Results ==
As candidates only need to receive more votes than their competitor, all MPs were elected with 41% or less of the vote. All parties received less than 15% of the vote. The races were extremely tight – in the constituency of Paama, MP Fred William Tasso won his seat by seven votes. Multiple new political parties won seats in this Parliament and the percentage of votes roughly equaled the percentage of seats granted.

In the official results, the Melanesian Progressive Party obtained one seat at the Éfaté constituency; however, weeks later the Court ordered a recount of the ballots and awarded the disputed seat to the Land and Justice Party.

Party	Votes	%	Seats	+/–
Vanua'aku Pati	13,463	11.91	6	–2
Union of Moderate Parties	10,999	9.73	6	+1
Land and Justice Party	8,028	7.10	7	+3
National United Party	6,511	5.76	4	0
People's Progressive Party	5,469	4.84	1	–5
Iauko Group	4,979	4.40	4	+1
Vanuatu National Development Party	4,942	4.37	2	New
Vanuatu Presidential Party	4,234	3.74	1	+1
Nagriamel	4,128	3.65	3	0
Reunification Movement for Change	3,887	3.44	3	0
Natatok Indigenous People's Democratic Party	3,024	2.67	1	–1
Green Confederation	2,851	2.52	2	–1
Leaders Party of Vanuatu	2,459	2.17	1	New
Vanuatu Republican Party	2,020	1.79	0	–1
Vanuatu Labour Party	1,780	1.57	1	+1
Vanuatu Liberal Democratic Party	1,565	1.38	0	–1
Friend Melanesian Party	1,465	1.30	1	+1
Vanuatu National Party	1,284	1.14	0	–1
Unity for Change	1,261	1.12	0	New
Hope Party	1,180	1.04	0	New
People's Services Party	1,032	0.91	1	0
Melanesian Progressive Party	992	0.88	0	–2
Moderate Alliance Party	701	0.62	0	New
Vanuatu Progressive Development Party	597	0.53	0	–1
Vanuatu New Vision in Development Party	447	0.40	0	New
Tafea Moderate Alliance	429	0.38	0	New
Vanuatu Progressive Republican Farmer Party	355	0.31	0	New
United Liberation Front	327	0.29	0	0
Vanuatu Democratic Party	327	0.29	0	0
Leaders Party for Change	322	0.28	0	New
Vete Alliance	306	0.27	0	New
Vemarana	304	0.27	0	0
Vanuatu Family First Party	211	0.19	0	0
Vanuatu Community Reform Party	157	0.14	0	New
People's Action Party	80	0.07	0	0
Vanuatu United and Equal Rights Part	47	0.04	0	New
Vanuatu Democratic Alliance and Liberation Party for Change	8	0.01	0	0
Independents	20,904	18.49	8	+4
Total	113,075	100.00	52	0
Valid votes	113,075	99.00		
Invalid/blank votes	1,141	1.00		
Total votes	114,216	100.00		
Registered voters/turnout	200,159	57.06		
Source: Extraordinary Gazette

=== By constituency ===
Ambae
Candidate	Party	Votes	%
Jacob Mata	Nagriamel	720	14.64
Jay Ngwele	Iauko Group	641	13.04
Alickson Vira	Natatok	593	12.06
James Bule	National United Party	505	10.27
Richard Mera	Vanua'aku Pati	505	10.27
Peter Vuta	Vanua'aku Pati	492	10.01
Hambert Toa	Independent	436	8.87
Michael Liu	Liberal Democratic Party	426	8.66
Steven Tahi	People's Progressive Party	306	6.22
Delphine Mera	Green Confederation	141	2.87
Jameson Gwero Bani	People's Services Party	112	2.28
Dickinson Vusilai	Independent	25	0.51
Nancy Bue Namoli	Vanuatu United and Equal Rights Party	15	0.31
Total		4,917	100.00
Valid votes		4,917	99.19
Invalid/blank votes		40	0.81
Total votes		4,957	100.00
Registered voters/turnout		8,414	58.91

Ambrym
Candidate	Party	Votes	%
Bruno Leingkone	National United Party	823	21.72
Albert Abel Williams	Land and Justice Party	710	18.73
Peter Bong	Green Confederation	656	17.31
Maki Simelum	Vanua'aku Pati	534	14.09
Joshua Bong	Union of Moderate Parties	498	13.14
Jossie Masmas	Vanuatu Republican Party	292	7.70
Douglas L. Tangtang	People's Progressive Party	273	7.20
Pierre David Dah	Vanuatu Community Reform Party	4	0.11
Total		3,790	100.00
Valid votes		3,790	98.31
Invalid/blank votes		65	1.69
Total votes		3,855	100.00
Registered voters/turnout		5,537	69.62

Banks
Candidate	Party	Votes	%
Jack Wona	Vanuatu National Development Party	717	27.81
Dunstan Hilton	People's Progressive Party	677	26.26
Christopher Mackenzie	National United Party	599	23.24
Batick Manusia	Natatok	552	21.41
Victor Ron	Independent	33	1.28
Total		2,578	100.00
Valid votes		2,578	98.47
Invalid/blank votes		40	1.53
Total votes		2,618	100.00
Registered voters/turnout		3,742	69.96

Efate
Candidate	Party	Votes	%
Norris Kalmet	Union of Moderate Parties	2,069	15.22
Joshua Kalsakau	Vanuatu Labour Party	1,390	10.23
Jerry Kanas	Independent	912	6.71
Gillion William	Land and Justice Party	843	6.20
Nato Taiwia	Melanesian Progressive Party	840	6.18
Matai Kalwatman Alista Noel	Independent	811	5.97
Alfred Rollen Carlot	Natatok	760	5.59
Pakoa Kaltonga	Vanua'aku Pati	695	5.11
Michel Taravaki	People's Progressive Party	682	5.02
Willie Tom Kalotuk	Reunification Movement for Change	671	4.94
Jean Noel Anis Joseph	Vanuatu National Development Party	593	4.36
Elmo Joseph	Vanua'aku Pati	569	4.19
Michel Kalworai Kalnawi	Independent	510	3.75
Ghislain Kaltack	Independent	492	3.62
Manuel Carlot	Vanuatu Democratic Party	291	2.14
Levi Ishmael Tarosa	Iauko Group	289	2.13
Jean-Claude Kanegai	Vanuatu Progressive Development Party	268	1.97
Markson Nibtik	Vanuatu Presidential Party	263	1.94
John Batty Kaltakae	Vanuatu National Party	187	1.38
Michel Ova Mokosei Taripakoa	Vanuatu National Party	164	1.21
Yan Taho Dapang Amos	Independent	113	0.83
Seule Tong	Vanuatu Community Reform Party	88	0.65
Amos Guy Waiane	Vanuatu New Vision in Development Party	56	0.41
Amos Tatangis Sheyrilld	Independent	35	0.26
Total		13,591	100.00
Valid votes		13,591	98.84
Invalid/blank votes		160	1.16
Total votes		13,751	100.00
Registered voters/turnout		30,479	45.12

Epi
Candidate	Party	Votes	%
Isaac Daniel Tongolilu	Independent	528	18.03
Seule Simeon	Union of Moderate Parties	511	17.45
Makin Valia Rita	Land and Justice Party	469	16.01
Isaac Hamarliu	People's Progressive Party	415	14.17
John Nil	Vanuatu National Development Party	322	10.99
Robert Bohn Sikol	Vanuatu National Development Party	286	9.76
Elwyn Saling Ambata	Independent	174	5.94
Toka Keven Joe	Vanua'aku Pati	116	3.96
Bal Abel Nash	Reunification Movement for Change	108	3.69
Total		2,929	100.00
Valid votes		2,929	98.85
Invalid/blank votes		34	1.15
Total votes		2,963	100.00
Registered voters/turnout		3,905	75.88

Luganville
Candidate	Party	Votes	%
Matai Seremaiah	Independent	1,818	31.11
Marc Ati	Iauko Group	966	16.53
Antoine Pikioune	Nagriamel	695	11.89
Kalvao Moli	Hope Party	659	11.28
George Wells	National United Party	642	10.99
Donald Restuetune	Vanuatu Presidential Party	456	7.80
Charley Ulas	Union of Moderate Parties	299	5.12
James Hinge	Independent	160	2.74
Judah Siba	Independent	85	1.45
Marie-Helene Barthelemy	Liberal Democratic Party	63	1.08
Total		5,843	100.00
Valid votes		5,843	99.12
Invalid/blank votes		52	0.88
Total votes		5,895	100.00
Registered voters/turnout		13,167	44.77

Maewo
Candidate	Party	Votes	%
Ian Wilson	Independent	1,239	66.26
Philip Boedoro	Vanua'aku Pati	631	33.74
Total		1,870	100.00
Valid votes		1,870	98.94
Invalid/blank votes		20	1.06
Total votes		1,890	100.00
Registered voters/turnout		2,637	71.67

Malekula
Candidate	Party	Votes	%
Sato Kilman	People's Progressive Party	1,065	7.93
Esmon Saimon	Vanua'aku Pati	1,018	7.58
Marcellino Barthelemy	Reunification Movement for Change	818	6.09
Don Ken Stephen	People's Services Party	718	5.34
Jerome Ludvaune	Union of Moderate Parties	668	4.97
Sala John	Land and Justice Party	663	4.93
Gracia Shadrack	Independent	629	4.68
Daniel Nalet	Land and Justice Party	608	4.53
Simeon Kaltalio	Vanua'aku Pati	594	4.42
Barthelemy Tulili	Vanua'aku Pati	536	3.99
Menzies Samuel Jack	Vanua'aku Pati	515	3.83
John Terry	Green Confederation	502	3.74
François Batick	Independent	484	3.60
Mondine Romone	Independent	421	3.13
Kalros Simeon	Vanua'aku Pati	398	2.96
Tony Ata	Independent	381	2.84
Dick Tete	People's Progressive Party	378	2.81
Gordon Regenvanu	Natatok	377	2.81
James Stephen	National United Party	360	2.68
Kalros Karli	Independent	336	2.50
Browny Donna Jeremiha	Vanuatu National Development Party	283	2.11
Lazard Meltenekneim	Nagriamel	250	1.86
Peter Manwo	Friend Melanesian Party	250	1.86
David Manlau Lovis	Family First Party	211	1.57
Willie Apia Masing	Vanuatu National Party	207	1.54
Peter Onis	Independent	188	1.40
Kisito Teilemb	Union of Moderate Parties	187	1.39
Jeneck Patunvanu	Vanuatu National Party	145	1.08
George Wesley Lapi	Unity for Change	100	0.74
Rex Owen Issachar	Hope Party	62	0.46
Fabien Malwersets	Vanuatu Republican Party	45	0.33
Joel Niptik	Independent	20	0.15
Timothy Nibtick	Reunification Movement for Change	18	0.13
Jimmon Esmon	Melanesian Progressive Party	0	0.00
Total		13,435	100.00
Valid votes		13,435	99.31
Invalid/blank votes		93	0.69
Total votes		13,528	100.00
Registered voters/turnout		17,141	78.92

Malo–Aore
Candidate	Party	Votes	%
Havo Molisale	Nagriamel	892	37.65
Uri Warawara	Land and Justice Party	835	35.25
Moulin Tabouti	Hope Party	459	19.38
Jacktasi George	Vanuatu Presidential Party	183	7.72
Total		2,369	100.00
Valid votes		2,369	98.79
Invalid/blank votes		29	1.21
Total votes		2,398	100.00
Registered voters/turnout		3,620	66.24

Paama
Candidate	Party	Votes	%
Fred William Tasso	Land and Justice Party	208	27.26
Andy Job Sam	Vanuatu National Development Party	201	26.34
Morris James Manon	Iauko Group	152	19.92
Johnny Albert Tomatelu	Vanua'aku Pati	124	16.25
Glen Takau	People's Progressive Party	56	7.34
Peter James H.	Independent	11	1.44
Paul Avock Hungai	Natatok	10	1.31
David Joel	Nagriamel	1	0.13
Total		763	100.00
Valid votes		763	99.22
Invalid/blank votes		6	0.78
Total votes		769	100.00
Registered voters/turnout		998	77.05

Pentecost
Candidate	Party	Votes	%
Silas Bule	National United Party	1,167	15.20
Charlot Salwai	Reunification Movement for Change	861	11.21
Francois Chani Tabisal	National United Party	711	9.26
Ham Lini	National United Party	587	7.65
Richard Walsh Leona	Independent	579	7.54
Bergmans Bebe Guru Molgogoi	Vanuatu Republican Party	565	7.36
Salathiel Taribas	Reunification Movement for Change	512	6.67
Russel Nari	Iauko Group	477	6.21
Steven Sau	Union of Moderate Parties	331	4.31
David Tosul	Land and Justice Party	330	4.30
Jean Baptiste Saltukro	Independent	311	4.05
Rolanson Bule Tor	Natatok	288	3.75
Danstan Tate	Nagriamel	229	2.98
Keithson Liu	People's Services Party	202	2.63
Gabriel Gulgul Wareat	Vanuatu Presidential Party	197	2.57
Vincent Boulekone	Green Confederation	172	2.24
Joseph Rono	Independent	121	1.58
Michael Tamata Siba	Vanuatu United and Equal Rights Party	32	0.42
Norbert Sumsum	Moderate Alliance Party	6	0.08
Total		7,678	100.00
Valid votes		7,678	98.25
Invalid/blank votes		137	1.75
Total votes		7,815	100.00
Registered voters/turnout		12,402	63.01

Port Vila
Candidate	Party	Votes	%
Kenneth Natapei	Vanua'aku Pati	1,279	8.33
Ishmael Kalsakau	Union of Moderate Parties	1,246	8.12
Ralph Regenvanu	Land and Justice Party	1,154	7.52
Jean-Pierre Nirua	Independent	1,148	7.48
Kalo Seule	Green Confederation	1,039	6.77
Ephraim Kalsakau	Independent	843	5.49
Ulrich Sumptoh	Union of Moderate Parties	775	5.05
Charles Lini	Unity for Change	738	4.81
Saby Natonga	Moderate Alliance Party	695	4.53
Nadia Kanegai	People's Progressive Party	578	3.77
Louis Kalnpel	Vanuatu Presidential Party	555	3.62
Joel George Toa	Independent	544	3.54
John William	Independent	514	3.35
Terry Kapah	Leaders Party of Vanuatu	428	2.79
Jerry Tafan Naieng Niatu	Unity for Change	423	2.76
Tony Berry Hosea	Vanuatu National Development Party	333	2.17
Abel David	Vete Alliance	306	1.99
Jeffery Wilfred Masoerangi	National United Party	305	1.99
Obi Mial Daniel	Vanuatu National Development Party	300	1.95
Willie Jimmy	Liberal Democratic Party	296	1.93
Johnny Kuanpeka Takana	Independent	264	1.72
Alain Carlot	Natatok	261	1.70
Pierre Tore	Independent	205	1.34
Jean-Luc Cassart	Vanuatu National Party	183	1.19
Ruben Olul Nungnung	Vanuatu National Party	174	1.13
Barak Sopé	Melanesian Progressive Party	152	0.99
Marcel Malili	Independent	135	0.88
Felix Nguyen	Independent	95	0.62
Hensley H. Garae	People's Action Party	80	0.52
Wendy Himford	Union of Moderate Parties	68	0.44
Roy Obed James Matariki	Vanuatu Community Reform Party	62	0.40
Badley Vanva	Vanuatu New Vision in Development Party	52	0.34
Jimmy James Moli	Independent	45	0.29
Maxime Carlot Korman	Vanuatu Democratic Party	36	0.23
Antoine Boudier	Independent	32	0.21
Daniel Molisa	Vanuatu Democratic Alliance and Liberation Party for Change	8	0.05
Total		15,351	100.00
Valid votes		15,351	99.09
Invalid/blank votes		141	0.91
Total votes		15,492	100.00
Registered voters/turnout		37,315	41.52

Santo
Candidate	Party	Votes	%
Hosea Ovock Rothul Nevu	Iauko Group	1,299	8.23
Alfred Maoh	Land and Justice Party	1,224	7.75
Samson Samsen	Vanuatu Presidential Party	1,098	6.95
Gaetan Pikinoune	Nagriamel	918	5.81
Rick Mahe Tchamako	Reunification Movement for Change	899	5.69
Edwin Amblus Macreveth	Friend Melanesian Party	761	4.82
Ronald Warsal Kalmasei	Vanua'aku Pati	664	4.20
Sakaes Lulu	People's Progressive Party	645	4.08
Vatout Moliare Maliu	Union of Moderate Parties	617	3.91
Livo Mele	Liberal Democratic Party	612	3.88
Silas Rocroc	Union of Moderate Parties	603	3.82
Kandy Norman	Union of Moderate Parties	571	3.62
Collin Tavi	Vanua'aku Pati	536	3.39
Johnathan Arutape	Vanuatu Presidential Party	486	3.08
Easter Rojo	Friend Melanesian Party	454	2.88
John Lum	Nagriamel	423	2.68
Jacob Bani	Independent	416	2.63
Sela Molisa	Vanua'aku Pati	403	2.55
Simon Timothy	Vanuatu National Development Party	355	2.25
Jean Ravou Akii Kolomoulé	Vanuatu Progressive Republican Farmer Party	355	2.25
Peter Stevens	Vemarana	304	1.93
Pierre Chanel Andimele Marsal	Leaders Party of Vanuatu	294	1.86
Gratiano Pipite	Vanuatu Republican Party	282	1.79
Valerien Ova	Union of Moderate Parties	260	1.65
François Tavuiru	Vanuatu Presidential Party	245	1.55
Mike Paululum	People's Progressive Party	235	1.49
Lindo Ravhor	Union of Moderate Parties	213	1.35
Morris Sengo	National United Party	190	1.20
Gaspard Moli Palaud	Vanuatu Republican Party	116	0.73
Jonah Simeon Kalorick	Independent	100	0.63
Jean-Dominique Raupepe	Independent	84	0.53
Elizabeth Moli	Independent	66	0.42
Tony Boroni	Independent	54	0.34
Manina Juanita Packete	Independent	9	0.06
Roger Key	Independent	0	0.00
Total		15,791	100.00
Valid votes		15,791	99.37
Invalid/blank votes		100	0.63
Total votes		15,891	100.00
Registered voters/turnout		25,861	61.45

Shepherds
Candidate	Party	Votes	%
Toara Daniel	Green Confederation	341	43.16
Harry Daniel	Vanuatu Progressive Development Party	329	41.65
Atis Kalo Manaroto	Vanuatu National Development Party	108	13.67
John M. Manuake	Independent	6	0.76
Noel Faionalave	Liberal Democratic Party	6	0.76
Total		790	100.00
Valid votes		790	98.75
Invalid/blank votes		10	1.25
Total votes		800	100.00
Registered voters/turnout		1,183	67.62

Southern Islands
Candidate	Party	Votes	%
Tomker Netvunei Naling	Union of Moderate Parties	504	25.30
Edward Nalyal Molou	Vanua'aku Pati	485	24.35
Ben Leeshi	Independent	443	22.24
Joe Iautu Ture	Leaders Party for Change	322	16.16
Meitai Tamasui	Land and Justice Party	238	11.95
Total		1,992	100.00
Valid votes		1,992	98.91
Invalid/blank votes		22	1.09
Total votes		2,014	100.00
Registered voters/turnout		2,759	73.00

Tanna
Candidate	Party	Votes	%
Joe Natuman	Vanua'aku Pati	1,479	9.09
Jotham Napat	Leaders Party of Vanuatu	1,471	9.04
Bob Loughman	Vanua'aku Pati	1,058	6.50
Tom Noam Iouniwan	Independent	943	5.80
Nakou Natuman	Union of Moderate Parties	903	5.55
Johnny Koanapo	Vanua'aku Pati	832	5.11
Andrew Solomon Napuat	Land and Justice Party	746	4.59
Emanuel Xavier Harry	Iauko Group	734	4.51
Robin Tom Kapapa	Vanuatu Republican Party	720	4.43
Jimmy Tom Lume	Vanuatu Presidential Party	633	3.89
Richard Namel Ruan	Independent	592	3.64
Morkin Steven	Union of Moderate Parties	588	3.61
Andrew Namhat Kausiama	Independent	581	3.57
William Nissian Kiel	Independent	557	3.42
Benson Willie Samuels Dhapahan	Independent	531	3.26
Jalson Willie Koda	Tafea Moderate Alliance	429	2.64
Yaris Leon Yawah	Vanuatu Labour Party	390	2.40
Roger Kiel	Independent	358	2.20
Mary Kaviamu Jack	Independent	340	2.09
James Maukura	Vanuatu New Vision in Development Party	339	2.08
Peter Sakita	Independent	333	2.05
Stevens Natouka Yapoum	Independent	309	1.90
Jimmy Nanuman Nipo	Leaders Party of Vanuatu	266	1.64
Louis Kaurua Kausiama	Vanuatu National Party	222	1.36
Joe Noclam	Vanuatu National Development Party	171	1.05
James Natman Lalo Iamak	Liberal Democratic Party	137	0.84
Christian Cranois Ialou	Independent	122	0.75
Kipsen Niespo Yamaimai	Vanuatu Presidential Party	118	0.73
William Loumai Louhman	Natatok	112	0.69
Jacques Nauka Meriago	Union of Moderate Parties	88	0.54
Harry Able Arram	Independent	62	0.38
Willie Smith Kawa	National United Party	56	0.34
Daniel Felix Iato	Independent	27	0.17
Jennifer Kapahai Manua	Independent	19	0.12
Lui Namark Etap	Independent	3	0.02
Peter Niamak Jeremiah	Independent	0	0.00
Total		16,269	100.00
Valid votes		16,269	99.15
Invalid/blank votes		139	0.85
Total votes		16,408	100.00
Registered voters/turnout		26,558	61.78

Tongoa
Candidate	Party	Votes	%
Kalo Pakoa Songi Lano	Iauko Group	421	33.15
Kalo Eric Pakoatau Marakiwola	National United Party	347	27.32
John Marc Bell Tapanga Saruru	Vanuatu National Development Party	244	19.21
George Kerby John	People's Progressive Party	159	12.52
Willie Noel	Natatok	71	5.59
Harrison John Manaroto	Liberal Democratic Party	25	1.97
Willie Ruben Abel	Vanuatu Community Reform Party	3	0.24
Total		1,270	100.00
Valid votes		1,270	99.30
Invalid/blank votes		9	0.70
Total votes		1,279	100.00
Registered voters/turnout		2,095	61.05

Torres
Candidate	Party	Votes	%
Christophe Emelee	Vanuatu National Development Party	1,029	55.65
Basil Hopkins	United Liberation Front	327	17.69
Luke Dini	Independent	272	14.71
Stanley Womack	National United Party	219	11.84
Raoulé Woleg Austin	Vanuatu National Party	2	0.11
Total		1,849	100.00
Valid votes		1,849	97.68
Invalid/blank votes		44	2.32
Total votes		1,893	100.00
Registered voters/turnout		2,346	80.69

== Aftermath ==
As there was not a clear majority of seats won by a single political party, parliamentarians from eight political parties and independent groups created a coalition to form a government. This coalition called for Charlot Salwai, a francophone, to be elected as Prime Minister on 11 February 2016. The opposition did not oppose this motion and Salwai was elected Prime Minister of Vanuatu by parliamentary vote. He declared his Cabinet the following day.

Portfolio	Minister	Party
Prime Minister	Charlot Salwai	Reunification of Movements for Change
Deputy Prime Minister, Minister for Trade	Joe Natuman	Vanua'aku Pati
Minister for Internal Affairs	Alfred Maoh	Graon mo Jastis Party
Minister for Foreign Affairs	Bruno Leingkone	National United Party
Minister for Finance	Gaetan Pikioune	Nagriamel
Minister for Lands	Ralph Regenvanu	Graon mo Jastis Party
Minister for Public Utilities	Jotham Napat	Leaders Party of Vanuatu
Minister for Justice	Ronald Warsal	Vanua'aku Pati
Minister for Climate Change	Ham Lini	National United Party
Minister for Education	Jean-Pierre Nirua	Independent
Minister for Health	Toara Daniel	Vanuatu Green Confederation
Minister for Youth and Sport	Norris Jack Kalmet	Union of Moderate Parties
Minister for Agriculture	Seremaia Matai	Independent
Source: Vanuatu Daily Digest

== Subsequent by-elections ==
=== 2016 Malo/Aore by-election ===
A by-election was called in June 2016 to elect an MP for the Malo/Aore constituency after the death of Havo Molisale. Uri Warawara of the Land and Justice Party defeated Bani Livo, an independent candidate.

Candidate	Party	Votes	%
Uri Warawara	Land and Justice Party	659	29.56
Bani Livo	Independent	476	21.35
Moli Juri Havo	Independent	322	14.45
George Wells	Independent	291	13.06
Makali Baniuri	Nagriamel	242	10.86
Toka Moliavea	People's Progressive Party	183	8.21
Harold Warahese	Independent	56	2.51
Total		2,229	100.00
Valid votes		2,229	97.25
Invalid/blank votes		63	2.75
Total votes		2,292	100.00
Registered voters/turnout		3,620	63.31
Majority		183	8.21
Source: Vanuatu Daily Post

=== 2018 Tanna by-election ===
Caused by the incumbent Joe Natuman being convicted of conspiracy to pervert the course of justice. The election was held on 25 September 2018. Jimmy Nipo was elected.

Candidate	Party
Jimmy Nipo Nanuman	Leaders Party of Vanuatu
Harry Iati Nakat Namak	Vanua'aku Pati
Jaick Charlie	Rural Development Party
Emanuel Xavier Harry	Iauko Group
Robin Tom Kapapa	Union of Moderate Parties
George Iapson	Independent
Mariango Jacques Nauka	Independent
Peter Marcel Nikiatu	Kia Koe
Francois John Kasso	Vanuatu National Democratic Party
Jocelyn Rose Sam	Leleon Vanua Democratic Party
Total

=== 2019 Efate Rural by-election ===
Caused by the death of incumbent MP Jerry Kanas (elected as an independent before joining Leaders Party of Vanuatu). Held on 2 September 2019, it resulted in a victory for Edwin Kalorisu of the Leaders Party.

Candidate	Party	Votes	%
Edwin Kalorisu	Leaders Party of Vanuatu	1,768	23.57
Timothy Thomas	Reunification Movement for Change	1,411	18.81
William Malas	New Nation Party	1,215	16.20
Stanley Kaltoi John	Vanua'aku Pati	1,025	13.67
Michael Taravaki	Vanuatu Liberal Movement	976	13.01
John Tavasei Alfred	Land and Justice Party	946	12.61
Fateful Zakari	People's Progressive Party	159	2.12
Total		7,500	100.00
Valid votes		7,500	98.31
Invalid/blank votes		129	1.69
Total votes		7,629	100.00
Registered voters/turnout		32,607	23.40
Majority		357	4.76
Source: Vanuatu Electoral Office

== See also ==
- List of members of the Parliament of Vanuatu (2016–2020)
