= 2012 Vanuatuan general election =

- 30 October 2012
- All 52 seats in Parliament; 26 seats needed for a majority
Party	Leader	Vote %	Seats	+/–
UMP	Serge Vohor	12.19	5	−2
Vanua'aku Pati	Edward Natapei	11.29	8	−3
People's Progressive	Sato Kilman	8.01	6	+2
National United	Ham Lin̄i	6.20	4	−4
Land & Justice	Ralph Regenvanu	6.02	4	New
RMC	Paul Telukluk	5.75	3	New
Nagriamel		4.23	3	+2
Iauko	Harry Iauko	3.68	3	New
Green Confederation	Moana Carcasses Kalosil	3.51	3	+1
Republican	Marcellino Pipite	3.01	1	New
Melanesian Progressive	Barak Sopé	2.81	2	+1
Liberal Democratic		2.48	1	New
National		1.62	1	0
Natatok		1.59	2	New
People's Services		0.77	1	New
Progressive Development		0.53	1	New
Independents	–	14.51	4	0
This lists parties that won seats. See the complete results below.
Prime Minister before	Subsequent Prime Minister
Sato Kilman; People's Progressive	Moana Carcasses Kalosil; Green Confederation

General elections were held in Vanuatu on 30 October 2012. The previous elections to the 52-member Parliament of Vanuatu were held in 2008. The largest parties in this election were the socialist Vanua'aku Party, which won 11 seats, and the social-democratic National United Party (8 seats). Thirteen other parties as well as four independents won parliamentary seats. As a result, Edward Natapei of the Vanua'aku Party was able to become the Prime Minister. Since then, both Serge Vohor of the conservative Union of Moderate Parties and Sato Kilman of the People's Progressive Party have held that position, with Kilman being the incumbent Prime Minister of Vanuatu at the time of the 2012 election.

== Electoral system ==
The 52 members of Parliament will be elected in 17 multi-member constituencies, using the single non-transferable vote.

Candidates had to be at least 25 years old, and could not have an undischarged prison sentence or bankruptcy. They also required the support of at least five registered voters in their constituency, and had to put down a non-refundable 50,000 vatu deposit. The President, judges, magistrates, civil servants, police officers, teachers and members of the National Council of Chiefs were all ineligible for election to Parliament.

== Campaign ==
346 candidates from 32 political parties contested the 52 seats.

There were 344 polling stations throughout the country, including 12 in the capital city, Port Vila. Over 192,000 citizens were eligible to vote in the 2012 election, with 34,998 registered voters in the capital city.

The election was being observed by representatives from Australia, China, the European Union and the United States, as well as the High Commissioner of New Zealand to Vanuatu, Bill Dobie. The international observers will submit a report on the election to the Vanuatuan government once the election is completed.

== Conduct ==
Following the election, Attorney General Ishmael Kalsakau alleged that three ministers, including Moana Carcasses Kalosil, engaged in vote buying to secure several seats in Port Vila.

== Results ==
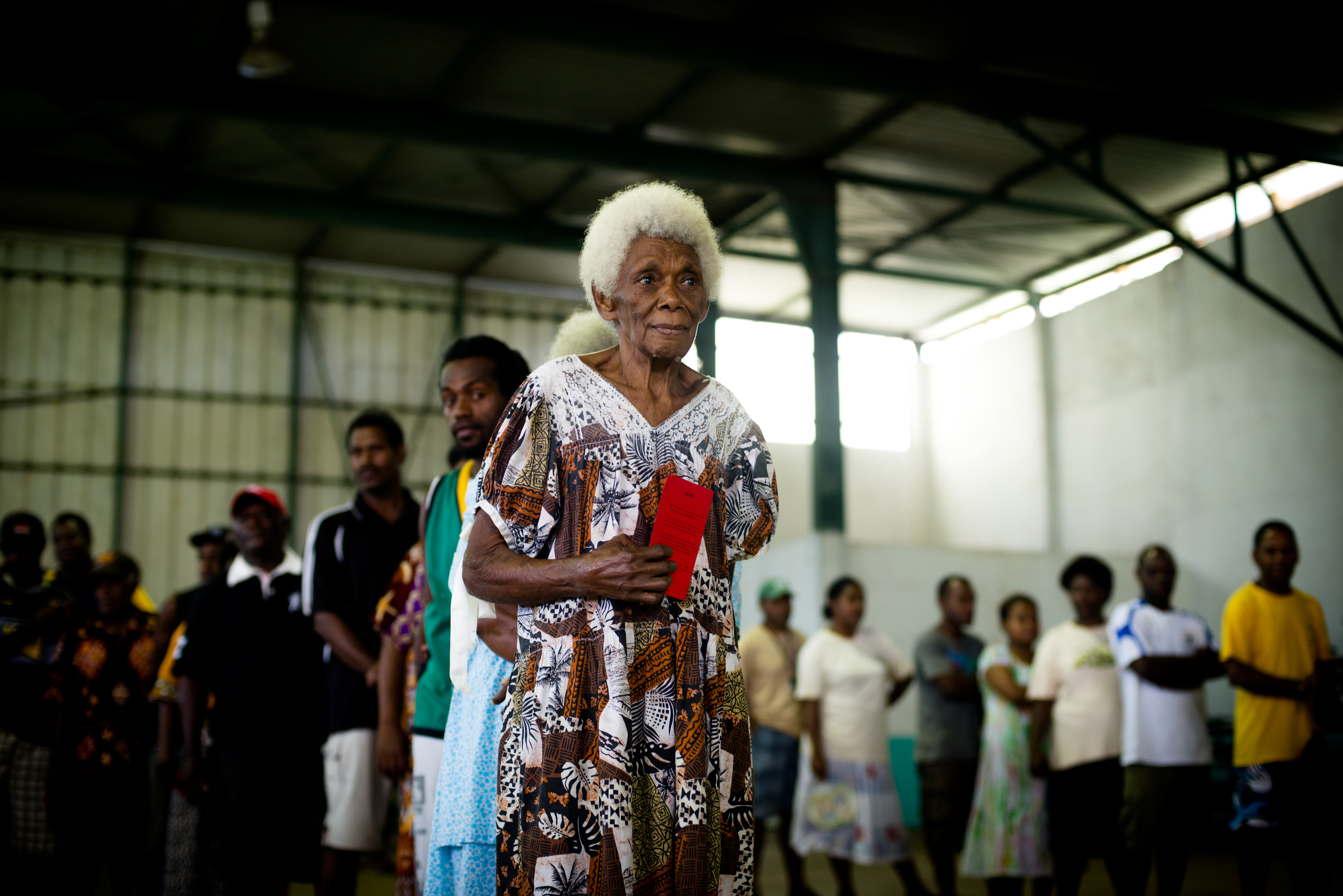
Voters at a polling station on election day.

Party	Votes	%	Seats	+/–
Union of Moderate Parties	14,675	12.19	5	–2
Vanua'aku Party	13,593	11.29	8	–3
People's Progressive Party	9,642	8.01	6	+2
National United Party	7,456	6.20	4	–4
Land and Justice Party	7,241	6.02	4	New
Reunification Movement for Change	6,921	5.75	3	New
Nagriamel	5,092	4.23	3	+2
Iauko Group	4,425	3.68	3	New
Green Confederation	4,219	3.51	3	+1
Vanuatu Republican Party	3,627	3.01	1	–6
Melanesian Progressive Party	3,379	2.81	2	+1
Vanuatu Liberal Democratic Party	2,982	2.48	1	New
Vanuatu Presidential Party	2,888	2.40	0	New
Vanuatu Democratic Party	2,110	1.75	0	0
Vanuatu National Party	1,955	1.62	1	0
Natatok Indigenous People's Democratic Party	1,915	1.59	2	New
National Community Association	1,878	1.56	0	0
Vanuatu Labour Party	1,182	0.98	0	–1
Friend Melanesian Party	1,069	0.89	0	0
People's Services Party	932	0.77	1	New
Union Liberation Front	758	0.63	0	New
Vanuatu Progressive Republican Party	671	0.56	0	New
People's Action Party	653	0.54	0	–1
Vanuatu Progressive Development Party	634	0.53	1	New
Vemarana 15 Islands Culture	561	0.47	0	New
Vanuatu Reform Democratic Party	525	0.44	0	New
Movement Blong ol Chief	450	0.37	0	New
Tanna United Front	387	0.32	0	New
Independent Movement	252	0.21	0	New
Maki Totsan	204	0.17	0	New
Vanuatu Liberal Party	186	0.15	0	New
Vanuatu Family First Party	144	0.12	0	–1
Kristian Democratic Party	97	0.08	0	New
Universal Ethnic System	87	0.07	0	New
Vanuatu Democratic & Liberal Party	55	0.05	0	New
Vanuatu Freedom Party	27	0.02	0	New
Vanuatu Democratic and Liberal Party for Change	20	0.02	0	New
Independents	17,462	14.51	4	0
Total	120,354	100.00	52	0
Valid votes	120,354	98.70		
Invalid/blank votes	1,589	1.30		
Total votes	121,943	100.00		
Registered voters/turnout	192,632	63.30		
Source: Extraordinary Gazette, Psephos

=== By constituency ===
Ambae
Candidate	Party	Votes	%
Richard Mera	Vanua'aku Party	1,237	23.38
James Bule	National United Party	546	10.32
Peter Vuta	Independent	413	7.81
Fred Tariwisi Buenamoli	People's Progressive Party	373	7.05
Lennox Brian Vuti	Union of Moderate Parties	364	6.88
Jay Ngwele	Iauko Group	349	6.60
Steven Tahi	Nagriamel	345	6.52
James Ngwango	People's Progressive Party	265	5.01
Joel Hubert Duvu	Nagriamel	238	4.50
Remy Viratiro	Reunification Movement for Change	223	4.22
Jacob Mata	People's Progressive Party	165	3.12
Arnold Bani	Vanuatu Liberal Democratic Party	148	2.80
Amon Gwero	People's Action Party	148	2.80
George H. Vinatedalibulu	Independent	121	2.29
Ernest Bani	Land and Justice Party	114	2.16
Simeon Nixon	Vanuatu Democratic Party	96	1.81
Samson Viranamanga	Vanuatu Republican Party	85	1.61
Tari Joram	Green Confederation	60	1.13
Total		5,290	100.00
Valid votes		5,290	99.10
Invalid/blank votes		48	0.90
Total votes		5,338	100.00
Registered voters/turnout		8,169	65.34

Ambrym
Candidate	Party	Votes	%
Maki Simelum	Vanua'aku Party	545	13.54
Bruno Leingkone	National United Party	457	11.36
Douglas Laan Tangtang	People's Progressive Party	434	10.79
Jossie Masmas	Vanuatu Republican Party	404	10.04
Norbert Masseng Nambong	Union of Moderate Parties	358	8.90
Paul Tarsong	Land and Justice Party	351	8.72
Rossie Mothy Jacob	Independent	344	8.55
Raphael Worwor	Reunification Movement for Change	305	7.58
Benoit Melipsis	Green Confederation	266	6.61
Sael Damassing	Union of Moderate Parties	239	5.94
Pakon Jonathan Pandad	Vanuatu Liberal Democratic Party	211	5.24
John Taho Stephen	Natatok	81	2.01
Tatu Abel	Vanuatu Democratic Party	16	0.40
Raymond Magekorkor	Melanesian Progressive Party	13	0.32
Total		4,024	100.00
Valid votes		4,024	98.82
Invalid/blank votes		48	1.18
Total votes		4,072	100.00
Registered voters/turnout		5,493	74.13

Banks and Torres
Candidate	Party	Votes	%
Christophe Emelee	Vanuatu National Party	1,028	22.43
Dunstan Hilton	People's Progressive Party	632	13.79
Roger Francis Pinerua	Independent	526	11.47
Basil Hopkins	Union Liberation Front	512	11.17
Edmond H. Sovan	National United Party	452	9.86
Frankie Field Din	National United Party	392	8.55
Raoule Austin Woleg	Union of Moderate Parties	226	4.93
Marie Nicolas	Vanuatu Liberal Part	186	4.06
John Bennet Somwia	Vanuatu Liberal Democratic Party	174	3.80
Thomas Isom Sawon	Vanua'aku Party	118	2.57
Daniel Roy	Vanuatu Republican Party	113	2.47
Victor Wetuwley Wetias	Independent	92	2.01
Victor Ron	People's Action Party	78	1.70
Ansel Lesley Baet	Green Confederation	47	1.03
Apia Mohuenu Karlo	Kristian Democratic Party	8	0.17
Total		4,584	100.00
Valid votes		4,584	98.56
Invalid/blank votes		67	1.44
Total votes		4,651	100.00
Registered voters/turnout		5,711	81.44

Efate
Candidate	Party	Votes	%
Steven Kalsakau	Reunification Movement for Change	1,205	7.92
Alfred Rollen Carlot	Natatok	1,126	7.40
Gillion Kalotiti William	Land and Justice Party	1,060	6.97
Nato Taiwia	Melanesian Progressive Party	1,022	6.72
Joshua Kalsakau	Vanuatu Labour Party	1,010	6.64
Jimmy Luna Tasong	Independent	829	5.45
Roro Sambo	Independent	827	5.44
Solo Tanarango	National Community Association	759	4.99
Harry Kalsong	Vanuatu Presidential Party	677	4.45
Bakoa Maraki Kaltongga	Vanua'aku Party	672	4.42
Yoan Mariasua	Union of Moderate Parties	672	4.42
Maxime Carlot Korman	Vanuatu Democratic Party	665	4.37
Levi Ishmael Tarosa	Independent	624	4.10
Jean Noel M. A. Joseph	Independent	614	4.04
Thomas Tau	Union of Moderate Parties	587	3.86
Toara Toarasavi Kalorib	Vanua'aku Party	448	2.94
Jerry Kanas	Independent	375	2.46
Elmo Manukat Joseph	Vanua'aku Party	373	2.45
Felix Nguyen	Independent	343	2.25
Richard Naikasei Kaltongga	People's Progressive Party	290	1.91
Bill Kalontan Kalpoi	People's Progressive Party	220	1.45
Nicolas Watt	Independent	194	1.28
Louis Guy Carlot	Vanuatu National Party	165	1.08
Roger Ernie	Vanuatu Liberal Democratic Party	124	0.81
Ati George Sokomanu	Vanuatu Presidential Party	114	0.75
John Kalosine Enock Rangimen	Vanuatu Reform Democratic Party	94	0.62
Jack Boblang	Vanuatu Republican Party	69	0.45
Fanny Cryrel	People's Progressive Party	57	0.37
Total		15,215	100.00
Valid votes		15,215	97.48
Invalid/blank votes		393	2.52
Total votes		15,608	100.00
Registered voters/turnout		29,044	53.74

Epi
Candidate	Party	Votes	%
Robert Bohn Sikol	Vanuatu Progressive Development Party	634	20.54
Isaac Bongbong Hamariliu	People's Progressive Party	443	14.36
Leinavao Tasso	Vanua'aku Party	337	10.92
Seoule Davidson Simeon	Union of Moderate Parties	335	10.86
Moses Erick	Iauko Group	323	10.47
Makin Rita Valia	Vanuatu Presidential Party	318	10.30
Benjimine Korah Jimmy	Land and Justice Party	279	9.04
Kerry William Nemaiah	Reunification Movement for Change	228	7.39
Enny Yonah	Vanuatu Presidential Party	71	2.30
Ioan Simon Omawa	Vanuatu Labour Party	53	1.72
Vakumali Novo	National United Party	37	1.20
Joel Pakoa Nalu	Vanuatu Liberal Democratic Party	28	0.91
Total		3,086	100.00
Valid votes		3,086	98.97
Invalid/blank votes		32	1.03
Total votes		3,118	100.00
Registered voters/turnout		4,123	75.62

Luganville
Candidate	Party	Votes	%
Kalvao Moli	Independent	788	14.82
George Wells	People's Progressive Party	622	11.70
Donald Restuetune	Iauko Group	516	9.71
Antoine Pikoune	Nagriamel	466	8.77
Harold Stephens	Land and Justice Party	424	7.98
Bernard Jimmy	Union of Moderate Parties	348	6.55
Brown Hill Harry	National United Party	327	6.15
John Timothy Mavutu	Green Confederation	248	4.67
Dominique Morin	Vanuatu Democratic Party	231	4.35
Erick John Tahun	Vanua'aku Party	210	3.95
Douglas Ngwele	Independent	181	3.40
Albert Samson Bue	Independent	178	3.35
Pierre Chanel Waresul Watas	Reunification Movement for Change	164	3.09
Raphael Yeoye Gabriel	Union Liberation Front	162	3.05
Harry Benjamen Vanva	People's Progressive Party	149	2.80
Philip Billy Black Yauko	Vanuatu Republican Party	113	2.13
Jimmy Daniel Aptvanu	Vemarana 15 Islands Culture	94	1.77
Samuel Stephen Vusi	People's Action Party	77	1.45
David Joel	Independent	18	0.34
Total		5,316	100.00
Valid votes		5,316	98.65
Invalid/blank votes		73	1.35
Total votes		5,389	100.00
Registered voters/turnout		10,821	49.80

Maewo
Candidate	Party	Votes	%
Philip Boedoro	Vanua'aku Party	424	24.64
Paul Jerry Boe	National United Party	415	24.11
Ian Wilson	Green Confederation	350	20.34
Jonas Cullwick	Union of Moderate Parties	276	16.04
Jackson Adin	Land and Justice Party	161	9.36
Swithin Saravar Adin	Vanuatu National Party	68	3.95
Alex Huri	Vanuatu Presidential Party	19	1.10
Reynold Toa	Vanuatu Democratic Party	8	0.46
Total		1,721	100.00
Valid votes		1,721	97.73
Invalid/blank votes		40	2.27
Total votes		1,761	100.00
Registered voters/turnout		2,391	73.65

Malekula
Candidate	Party	Votes	%
Sato Kilman	People's Progressive Party	1,022	6.80
Esmon Saimon	Melanesian Progressive Party	812	5.40
Daniel Nalet	Land and Justice Party	705	4.69
Jérôme Ludvaune	Union of Moderate Parties	640	4.26
Don Ken Stephen	People's Services Party	629	4.18
Paul Telukluk	Reunification Movement for Change	599	3.98
Kaltaliu Simeon	Vanua'aku Party	575	3.82
Esau Ken	People's Progressive Party	545	3.63
Brownie Donna	Vanuatu Republican Party	545	3.63
Dale Philip Fanisvai	National United Party	531	3.53
Norbert Ngpan	People's Progressive Party	519	3.45
Kisito Teilemb	Union of Moderate Parties	512	3.41
Tony Ata	Independent	504	3.35
Armand B. B. Akone	Independent	464	3.09
Neil Stevens Netaf	Independent	463	3.08
Maurice Michel	Green Confederation	455	3.03
Alick Massing	Melanesian Progressive Party	418	2.78
Maxwell Maltok	Melanesian Progressive Party	376	2.50
Jack Zedak	Vanuatu Liberal Democratic Party	314	2.09
Gordon N. A. Regenvanu	Vanuatu National Party	308	2.05
John T. Bongfur	Independent	307	2.04
Esrom Curcurfaharo	National United Party	286	1.90
Pierre Chanel Worwor	Independent	279	1.86
Tom Andrew Natnaur	Iauko Group	279	1.86
Natir Clayton Neimkon	People's Services Party	277	1.84
John K. N. Nelpard	Reunification Movement for Change	263	1.75
Jean Luc Muluane	Reunification Movement for Change	213	1.42
Paolo Lawak	Maki Totsan	204	1.36
Wesly Hary Laby	Friend Melanesian Party	202	1.34
Patrick Tevanu	Vanuatu Presidential Party	184	1.22
Johnny Solomon	Vanuatu Presidential Party	182	1.21
Anata Lingtamat	Vanua'aku Party	177	1.18
Marc Ureleles	Union of Moderate Parties	150	1.00
Kaloa James	Vanuatu Democratic Party	142	0.94
Allan Dungun Vanu	Independent	119	0.79
Clovis Malerenvanu	Independent	111	0.74
Paul Willie Ruben	Independent	108	0.72
Kensy Yosef	Independent	105	0.70
Donald Sanhabat	Independent	101	0.67
Meleoune Gounael	Vanuatu Republican Party	91	0.61
Lenneth Enbue	Union Liberation Front	84	0.56
Jerry Esrom	Independent	59	0.39
Kenny Atis	Vanuatu Presidential Party	48	0.32
Sosolito Serake	Independent	36	0.24
Eta Rory	Vanuatu Labour Party	30	0.20
Vitel Vanusoksok	Vanuatu Democratic Party	30	0.20
Billyson Nimbwen	Vanuatu Presidential Party	17	0.11
Martin Koubak	Independent	10	0.07
Martial Koubak	Union of Moderate Parties	4	0.03
Total		15,034	100.00
Valid votes		15,034	99.20
Invalid/blank votes		122	0.80
Total votes		15,156	100.00
Registered voters/turnout		20,132	75.28

Malo–Aore
Candidate	Party	Votes	%
Havo Molisale	Nagriamel	815	34.06
Bani Livo	Union of Moderate Parties	797	33.31
Rosemary Antas	Vanua'aku Party	277	11.58
William Vira Lenox	Independent	273	11.41
David Avok Taviando	People's Progressive Party	231	9.65
Total		2,393	100.00
Valid votes		2,393	98.56
Invalid/blank votes		35	1.44
Total votes		2,428	100.00
Registered voters/turnout		3,683	65.92

Paama
Candidate	Party	Votes	%
Jonas James	Natatok	348	43.88
Johnny Vanosive	Land and Justice Party	182	22.95
David Harry Avock	People's Progressive Party	91	11.48
Issac Fred Vanosive	Vanua'aku Party	80	10.09
Aison Robson Afis	Union of Moderate Parties	64	8.07
Tom Mail Bethuel	People's Services Party	26	3.28
Peter Souvai Charley	Green Confederation	2	0.25
Isaiah Vano Holou	Melanesian Progressive Party	0	0.00
Total		793	100.00
Valid votes		793	96.59
Invalid/blank votes		28	3.41
Total votes		821	100.00
Registered voters/turnout		932	88.09

Pentecost
Candidate	Party	Votes	%
Ham Lini	National United Party	1,134	13.69
Charlot Salwai	Reunification Movement for Change	901	10.88
David Tosul	People's Progressive Party	688	8.31
Tony Nari	Iauko Group	609	7.35
Silas B. Bule Melve	National United Party	600	7.24
Steven Sau	Union of Moderate Parties	593	7.16
Reginals Saonbilas Bebe	Vanua'aku Party	561	6.77
Chani Francois Tabisalsal	Vanua'aku Party	496	5.99
Barnabas A. Tabirupmwel	Vanuatu Presidential Party	380	4.59
Bruce Asal	Reunification Movement for Change	360	4.35
Salathiel Taribas	Reunification Movement for Change	298	3.60
Samson Buleuru	Independent Movement	252	3.04
Ezekiel Bule	National United Party	243	2.93
Saka Bule Saltugro	Independent	225	2.72
Ronald Bulewak Molbah	Union of Moderate Parties	221	2.67
Edouard Muelsul	Union of Moderate Parties	188	2.27
Joseph Tariodo	Green Confederation	116	1.40
Athanas D. Rentamit	Independent	107	1.29
Noel Mala Tamata	People's Progressive Party	90	1.09
Gabriel Rahupane Wareat	Vanuatu Presidential Party	60	0.72
Brian Bule	Melanesian Progressive Party	48	0.58
Luc Siba	Vanuatu Presidential Party	46	0.56
Edouard Bororoa	Vanuatu Republican Party	43	0.52
Lazare Asal	Natatok	23	0.28
Total		8,282	100.00
Valid votes		8,282	98.43
Invalid/blank votes		132	1.57
Total votes		8,414	100.00
Registered voters/turnout		11,634	72.32

Port Vila
Candidate	Party	Votes	%
Ralph Regenvanu	Land and Justice Party	2,286	12.88
Edward Natapei	Vanua'aku Party	1,389	7.83
Antoine Wright	Union of Moderate Parties	1,036	5.84
Moana Carcasses Kalosil	Green Confederation	1,020	5.75
Willie Jimmy	Vanuatu Liberal Democratic Party	927	5.22
Patrick Crowby	Union of Moderate Parties	917	5.17
Charles Vatu	Land and Justice Party	757	4.27
Jean Luc Nono Cassart	Independent	644	3.63
Ishmael Kalsakau	Vanua'aku Party	638	3.60
Charlot Rory	Reunification Movement for Change	464	2.61
Noel Nono Lango	National United Party	456	2.57
Johnson Iawan	National Community Association	421	2.37
Alick George Noel	Vanuatu Republican Party	403	2.27
Ephraim Kalsakau	Independent	397	2.24
Samson Kilman	People's Progressive Party	354	2.00
Louis Kalnpel	Vanuatu Presidential Party	353	1.99
Hannington Alatoa	People's Action Party	350	1.97
Sam Dan Avock	Vanua'aku Party	346	1.95
Paul Avock Hungai	Independent	325	1.83
Morris David Timataso	Vanuatu National Party	314	1.77
Johnston Kalman John Tau	Independent	313	1.76
Barak Sopé	Melanesian Progressive Party	311	1.75
Jimmy Moli James	Independent	309	1.74
Yan Taho Dapang Amos	People's Progressive Party	297	1.67
Semy Bangalulu	Iauko Group	290	1.63
Maximo Henry	People's Progressive Party	287	1.62
Marco Herrominly	Vanuatu Democratic Party	269	1.52
Chitty Loulou	Natatok	266	1.50
Malachi Sako	Independent	199	1.12
Willy Posen	Independent	189	1.07
Hezekiah Loloi	Independent	162	0.91
Jeff Joel Patunvanu	Nagriamel	151	0.85
Caleb James	Family First Vanuatu Party	144	0.81
Jeremy Noar	Independent	96	0.54
Jenny Ligo Viregagaru	Independent	96	0.54
Letty Paltie William Kaltonga	Vanuatu Labour Party	89	0.50
Allan Newman	Independent	88	0.50
Hilda Lini	Universal Ethnic System	87	0.49
Johnny Joseph A. Arnhambat	Vanuatu Democratic & Liberal Party	55	0.31
Williamson Obed Naros	Vanuatu Reform Democratic Party	46	0.26
Godwin Bill Ligo	Independent	40	0.23
Donald Massing K. Satungia	Independent	40	0.23
Wendy Himford	Kristian Democratic Party	39	0.22
Micky Joe Mike Macki	Vanuatu Freedom Party	27	0.15
Daniel Molisa R. Mondei	Vanuatu Democratic and Liberal Party for Change	20	0.11
Hendon M. T. Kalsakau	Vanuatu Reform Democratic Party	17	0.10
George Bumseng	Independent	11	0.06
Maryanne Bani	Independent	5	0.03
Moy Huu Dinh Xuan	Independent	4	0.02
Total		17,744	100.00
Valid votes		17,744	99.02
Invalid/blank votes		175	0.98
Total votes		17,919	100.00
Registered voters/turnout		34,998	51.20

Santo
Candidate	Party	Votes	%
Samson Samsen	Nagriamel	1,259	8.01
Marcellino Pipite	Vanuatu Republican Party	1,238	7.88
Serge Vohor	Union of Moderate Parties	1,101	7.00
John Lum	Nagriamel	886	5.64
Arnold Prasad	Green Confederation	770	4.90
Alfred Maoh	Land and Justice Party	715	4.55
Hosea Nevu	Iauko Group	672	4.27
Jean Kalomoule Ravou-Akii	Vanuatu Progressive Republican Party	671	4.27
Lorin Solomon	Union of Moderate Parties	661	4.20
Maliu Arsen	Union of Moderate Parties	626	3.98
Vatout Maliu Maliare	Nagriamel	624	3.97
Sela Molisa	Vanua'aku Party	588	3.74
Taerono Peta Voyasusu	Friend Melanesian Party	527	3.35
Emil Meley	Vanuatu Liberal Democratic Party	504	3.21
Joel Paul	Reunification Movement for Change	450	2.86
Roger Key	Vanua'aku Party	432	2.75
Tavue Langi Langi	Union of Moderate Parties	405	2.58
Morris Sengo	National United Party	355	2.26
Banabass Visi	Independent	353	2.25
Lui Patu Navoko	Friend Melanesian Party	340	2.16
Philip Peyetanis P. Andikar	Reunification Movement for Change	320	2.04
Jiro Atevari Bani	Nagriamel	308	1.96
Rogen Molafea Morris	Vanuatu Reform Democratic Party	306	1.95
Lili Alfred	Vemarana 15 Islands Culture	295	1.88
Ishmael William	People's Progressive Party	216	1.37
Didier Joel Tuvuiae	People's Progressive Party	213	1.35
Leon Aesoso	Vanuatu Democratic Party	200	1.27
Jack Andfalo	Vanuatu Presidential Party	195	1.24
Marc Imbert	Reunification Movement for Change	189	1.20
Yankee Stevens	Vemarana 15 Islands Culture	172	1.09
David Varucil Paialoloso	Melanesian Progressive Party	53	0.34
Purity Tavue	Kristian Democratic Party	50	0.32
Simion Kele	Vanuatu National Party	26	0.17
Total		15,720	100.00
Valid votes		15,720	98.92
Invalid/blank votes		172	1.08
Total votes		15,892	100.00
Registered voters/turnout		24,433	65.04

Shepherds
Candidate	Party	Votes	%
Toara Daniel	Green Confederation	265	31.47
Baptiste Maribu Firiam	Vanua'aku Party	153	18.17
John Mark Ruben	Vanuatu Liberal Democratic Party	101	12.00
Moses Stevens Jenery	Vanuatu Presidential Party	92	10.93
William Pakoa	Independent	67	7.96
Robert Barrack Samue	People's Progressive Party	54	6.41
Atesh Kalo	Vanuatu National Party	46	5.46
Willie Watson	Independent	36	4.28
John Tarinuamata Luen	National United Party	15	1.78
Georgy Carlo	Iauko Group	10	1.19
Marion Luen	Melanesian Progressive Party	3	0.36
Total		842	100.00
Valid votes		842	99.29
Invalid/blank votes		6	0.71
Total votes		848	100.00
Registered voters/turnout		1,058	80.15

Southern Islands
Candidate	Party	Votes	%
Tesei John Nawai	Vanua'aku Party	523	24.28
Tom Kor Netvunei	Union of Moderate Parties	501	23.26
Joe Iautu Ture	Independent	347	16.11
Philip Chairlie Norwo	Iauko Group	323	15.00
Joel Nasveria Simo	Land and Justice Party	207	9.61
Thomas John Nendu	Green Confederation	92	4.27
Jennifer Manua	National United Party	87	4.04
Joe Saul	Vanuatu Reform Democratic Party	54	2.51
Simon Umah Lovo	Vanuatu Presidential Party	20	0.93
Total		2,154	100.00
Valid votes		2,154	98.94
Invalid/blank votes		23	1.06
Total votes		2,177	100.00
Registered voters/turnout		2,662	81.78

Tanna
Candidate	Party	Votes	%
Silas Ratan Rouard	Union of Moderate Parties	1,067	6.34
Harry Iauko	Iauko Group	1,054	6.26
Richard Ruan Namel	Independent	922	5.48
Thomas Laken	Independent	890	5.29
Bob Loughman	Vanua'aku Party	791	4.70
Moking Stephen Iatika	National United Party	788	4.68
Joe Natuman	Vanua'aku Party	764	4.54
Jacques Nauka Meriago	Union of Moderate Parties	736	4.37
Sabi Natonga	National Community Association	698	4.14
Moses Kahu	Vanua'aku Party	652	3.87
Michael Kapalu	Union of Moderate Parties	636	3.78
Willie Lop	People's Progressive Party	601	3.57
Lui Etap Namark	Independent	530	3.15
Tom L. Yaris Yawah	Vanuatu Republican Party	512	3.04
Jeffery Maniper	Independent	500	2.97
Andrew N. Kausiama	Vanua'aku Party	485	2.88
Remi Iamtiu Kalih	Reunification Movement for Change	477	2.83
Harris N aunun	Green Confederation	457	2.71
Judah Takai Isaac	Vanuatu Democratic Party	453	2.69
Robin Tom Kapapa	Movement Blong ol Chief	450	2.67
Robert J. T. Namatak	People's Progressive Party	420	2.49
Iamnock Iakar TIavis	Independent	413	2.45
Albert Willie Karlosaruru	Independent	407	2.42
Keasipai Luata Song	Tanna United Front	387	2.30
Kelson Rappai Hosea	Vanuatu Liberal Democratic Party	365	2.17
Jimmy Lailai Kasse	Union of Moderate Parties	333	1.98
Joseph Iokaim	Vanua'aku Party	295	1.75
Tom Iapasey Kuahi	Reunification Movement for Change	262	1.56
Sailas Andrew	Independent	159	0.94
Tom Kahie	Vanuatu Presidential Party	112	0.67
Kanam Wilson Naplau	Independent	87	0.52
Raymond Nase	Natatok	71	0.42
Manu Iaiofao T. Iautuan	Independent	58	0.34
Peter Jeremiah Niamak	Vanuatu Reform Democratic Party	8	0.05
Total		16,840	100.00
Valid votes		16,840	98.88
Invalid/blank votes		190	1.12
Total votes		17,030	100.00
Registered voters/turnout		25,381	67.10

Tongoa
Candidate	Party	Votes	%
John Amos	People's Progressive Party	364	27.66
Eric Pakoa	National United Party	335	25.46
Willie Reuben Abel	Melanesian Progressive Party	323	24.54
David Peter Johnatan	Vanuatu Liberal Democratic Party	86	6.53
Willie Roy Harry	Union of Moderate Parties	82	6.23
Nicole Kaloran Jimmy	Green Confederation	71	5.40
Jack Nelson Rarua	Independent	37	2.81
John Robert T. Alick	Vanuatu Republican Party	11	0.84
Peter T. Morris	Vanua'aku Party	7	0.53
Total		1,316	100.00
Valid votes		1,316	99.62
Invalid/blank votes		5	0.38
Total votes		1,321	100.00
Registered voters/turnout		1,967	67.16

== Subsequent by-elections ==
- 2013 Tanna by-election, following the death of Harry Iauko, Iauko Group MP for Tanna. By-election won by his son Pascal Iauko (Iauko Group)
- 2015 Port-Vila by-election, following the death of Edward Natapei, Vanua'aku Pati MP for Port-Vila. The by-election was won by Kenneth Natapei for the Vanua'aku Pati.

== See also ==
- List of members of the Parliament of Vanuatu (2012–2016)
