= 2015 Port Vila by-election =

- 15 October 2015
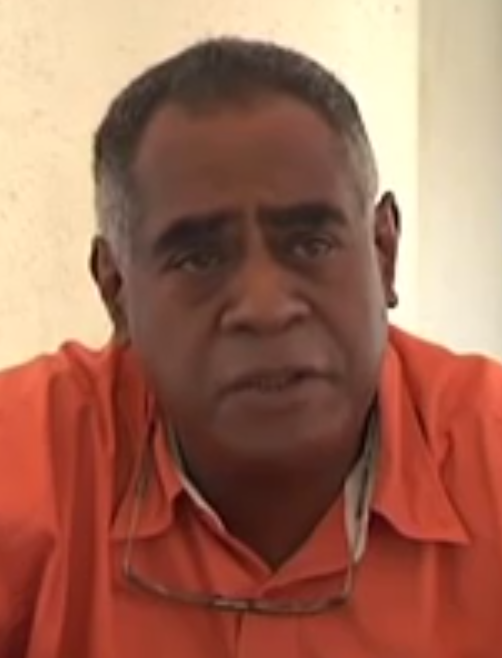
	First party	Second party
	VAN
Candidate	Kenneth Natapei	Ishmael Kalsakau
Party	Vanua'aku	Independent
Popular vote	4,600	3,205
Percentage	44.95%	31.32%
Swing	▲31.58pp	▲27.70pp
MP before election
Edward Natapei
Vanua'aku
Elected MP
Kenneth Natapei
Vanua'aku

A by-election to the Parliament of Vanuatu was held in the constituency of Port-Vila (the capital city) on 15 October 2015. It followed the death of sitting MP (former Prime Minister, and incumbent Leader of the Opposition) Edward Natapei, of the centre-left Vanua'aku Pati. Natapei died after a long illness in July. Although Port-Vila is a multi-member constituency, only one seat was vacant, and therefore only one new member was elected.

== Candidates ==
The parliamentary Opposition parties (Vanua'aku Pati, National United Party, Melanesian Progressive Party, Land and Justice Party, Nagriamel, and Reunification Movement for Change) agreed to endorse a single candidate: Natapei's eldest son, Kenneth Natapei, also of the Vanua'aku Pati. On the government side, the Union of Moderate Parties (centre-right) also initially endorsed Kenneth Natapei, before putting forward its own candidate. Ultimately, five other candidates took part in the election alongside Natapei : Alatoi Ishmael Kalsakau (independent), Nadia Kanegai (People's Progressive Party), Allan Carlot (Natatok), Georgie Calo (Union of Moderate Parties) and Jocelyn Mete (independent).

== Results ==
With a low turnout (approx. 27.6%), Kenneth Natapei was declared the winner by a clear margin. Following the unseating of fourteen members of Parliament upon conviction for bribery, however, President Baldwin Lonsdale dissolved Parliament on 24 November, and called a snap general election. Natapei had not yet been sworn in. He held his seat in the ensuing general election, which also saw by-election candidate Ishmael Kalsakau feature among Port-Vila's six elected representatives.

Candidate	Party	Votes	%
Kenneth Natapei	Vanua'aku Pati	4,600	44.95
Ishmael Kalsakau	Independent	3,205	31.32
Nadia Kanegai	People's Progressive Party	974	9.52
Georgie Calo	Union of Moderate Parties	918	8.97
Allan Carlot	Natatok Indigenous People's Democratic Party	380	3.71
Jocelyn Mete	Independent	156	1.52
Total		10,233	100.00
Valid votes		10,233	99.97
Invalid/blank votes		3	0.03
Total votes		10,236	100.00
Registered voters/turnout		37,324	27.42
