= Nadia Kanegai =

Vanuatu politician and entrepreneur

- Born: Nadia Kanegai
- Occupations: Social entrepreneur, politician & historian

Nadia Kanegai is a social entrepreneur, politician and historian from Vanuatu. She made the first study of women's traditional tattooing on Ambae. She has stood as a candidate in three elections in Vanuatu and was a prominent community activist during the 2017 and 2018 eruptions of Manaro Voui.

== Early life ==
Kanegai's family are from the island of Ambae - her father, Antoine, was a boat builder. Both her parents were politically active: her father was a member of the Union of Moderate Parties (UMP) and her mother was a member of the Vanua’aku Pati. Kanegai attended Malapoa College and then went to Australia for further study, returning to Vanuatu afterwards where she taught English and Social Science at her old college. She then returned to Australia once more for study for an MA in education.

== Cultural heritage ==
In the mid-1980s Kanegai was awarded a grant from the Australian Government, via the Vanuatu Cultural Centre (VCC) to undertake a study of women's tattooing on Ambae. This was one of the first projects undertaken by the VCC that recorded women's kastom practices. As part of her research she recorded a number of interviewers with tattooists and described how most tattoo motifs for women are based on textile designs. The subsequent ethnographic publication, Bure Blong Ambae, was the first to made by a "ni-Vanuatu on aspects of her own island culture". During her fieldwork she met and photographed eight of the last surviving Bure (high-status women with chest to calf tattoos), as well as recording one of the last surviving menstruation huts. A previous project, begun in 1982 examined traditional and modern money in Vanuatu.

In March 1990, after Kanegai returned from her second study period in Australia, she was employed as education office by the VCC. She was the first woman to employed by the VCC with duties beyond administration. However, she resigned after a few days once it became clear that there was no budget to support her work.

== Social entrepreneurship ==
In 1990 Kanegai returned to Vanuatu where she began work at the Radisson Hotel - there her work in social inclusion began when she advocated for the training and employment of thirty school drop-outs. In 1990 she also established the Childcare Centre, initially a nursery where mothers could leave their children whilst they worked, that evolved into a school. Other social projects she has funded included providing nutritional education for 5000 women in rural communities.

Telecoms Vanuatu employed Kanegai for twenty years. In 2017 Kanegai was working as Senior Advisor to the Taxi Ambassador Programme run by the Tourism Office. On 9 July 2020 she launched the Vanuatu Handicrafts Association, which is the first organisation to advocate on behalf of all ni-Vanuatu craft producers.

== Politics ==
Kanegai has been treasurer of the People's Progressive Party (PPP). During her tenure as treasurer of the PPP, Kanegai worked for the Vanuatu National Provident Fund (VNPF). At the time the code of conduct for the VNPF prohibited employees from political activity, and her appointment was marked by accusations of nepotism. During the government of Sato Kilman, from 2011 to 2013, she was appointed as a political advisor.

She has stood for election on three occasions. In the 2015 Port Vila by-election, Kanegai ran as a candidate for the PPP. She finished third with 974 votes. In the 2016 Vanuatu general election, she was one of only eight women contesting seats; she stood for Port Vila on behalf of the PPP. In the 2020 Vanuatu general election, she stood as an independent candidate for the Port Vila seat, where she received 858 votes, but was not elected.

== Manaro Voui eruptions ==
During the eruption of the Manaro Voui volcano in 2017, Kanegai hired a light aircraft to evacuate people from Ambae, paying for the flights with her own income. On the first day the aircraft made 18 trips, each costing approximately £1000 each. When the permanent evacuation of the island was announced in 2018, Kanegai advocated for the needs of those affected.
