= Oliver Saksak =

Vanuatuan judge

Oliver Abraham Saksak (born 20 December 1960) is a Vanuatuan judge who has sat on the Supreme Court of Vanuatu since May 1997.

== Early life ==
He hails from Ambrym in Malampa Province.

== Rulings ==
He put a stay on Gracia Shadracks ruling as speaker of the Parliament until a court could formally consider the dispute. He sentenced former minister Esmon Saimon in December 2021.
