= Litiana Kalsrap =

Ni-Vanuatu politician (born 1992)

Litiana Kalsrap (born 1992) is a youth leader and climate activist from Vanuatu. In 2020 she was the youngest woman to contest a seat in the 2020 Vanuatu general election. In 2018 she was a recipient of a Queens Young Leader Award.

== Biography ==
Kalsrap is from Pango village on Efate Island; she was born in 1992 and is an only child.

In 2018 she was awarded a Queens Young Leader Award for her work in youth engagement and climate activism, particularly through her work as a youth counsellor for Pango Area Council. Kalsrap organised beach clean-ups as well as tree-planting sessions with other young people. The award was presented to her by Queen Elizabeth II. The award includes a year-long mentorship programme.

In 2019 she represented Tongoa Shepherd Women’s Association at a digital summit honouring the achievements of Dag Hammarskjöld. In 2020 Kalsrap ran for election to the Vanuatu parliament. Her candidacy was endorsed by the Shepherds Alliance Party. She was the youngest candidate to contest a seat, but was not elected. She is a member of 350 Pacific, which a youth-led organisation enabling communities to address climate crisis.
