= Havo Molisale =

Vanuatuan politician

Member of Parliament (2008 - 2016)

Personal details
- Born: 9 June 1962
- Died: 23 February 2023 (aged 60) Malo Island, Vanuatu
- Party: Nagriamel

Havo Molisale (June 9, 1962 – February 23, 2016) was a Vanuatuan politician. Molisale was first elected to the Parliament of Vanuatu in 2008 from the Malo/Aore Constituency in Sanma Province. He won re-election to Parliament in the 2012 and January 2016 general elections. He was a member of the Nagriamel political party.

Molisale was a native of Malo Island in Sanma Province.

He was appointed Minister of Agriculture, Fisheries, Forestry and Quarantine on September 22, 2008, within the government of Prime Minister Edward Natapei. In November 2015, he was appointed acting Foreign Minister of Vanuatu within the government of Prime Minister Sato Kilman, a position he held from November 2015 to February 2016.

Most recently, Molisale won re-election to a third term in Parliament in the general election on January 22, 2016. He defeated Uri Warawara of the Land and Justice Party (GJP), who placed second. Molisale was one of three members of the Nagriamel party to be elected to Parliament in 2016.

Havo Molisale was elected Second Deputy Speaker of Parliament on February 11, 2016. Later in February, Molisale returned to his home island of Malo to host a feast to thank voters for re-electing him to Parliament in 2016. He died unexpectedly in Malo on Tuesday night, February 23, 2016.
