= Vanuatu Progressive Development Party =

Political party in Vanuatu

The Vanuatu Progressive Development Party (VPDP) is a political party in Vanuatu.

== History ==
The party was founded in 2011 by Robert Bohn Sikol and Peter Mowa.

== Electoral results ==
Elections to the Parliament of Vanuatu
Election	Votes	Vote %	Seats	Seat change
2012	634	0.53	1	▲1
2016	597	0.53	0	▼1
2020	825	0.57	1	▲1
2022	1,318	1.00	1	Steady
2025	2,281	1.56	1	Steady
