= Vanuatu Presidential Party =

- Leader: Louis Kalnpel
- Founded: 2010s
- Parliament: 0 / 52

The Vanuatu Presidential Party (VPP) is a political party in Vanuatu.

== History ==
The party was formed by Louis Kalnpel and former Presidents Ati George Sokomanu and John Bani.

In the 2012 general elections the party nominated 17 candidates, receiving 2.4% of the vote and failing to win a seat.

In the 2016 elections the party fielded eleven candidates, winning one seat; Samson Samsen in Santo.

The party didn't contest the 2020 election, and failed to win any seat in the 2022 election.

== Election results ==
=== Parliament ===
Election	Leader	Votes	%	Seats	+/–	Status
2012	Louis Kalnpel	2,888	2.40 (#13)	0 / 52	New	Extra-parliamentary
2016	Louis Kalnpel	4,234	3.74 (#8)	1 / 52	▲1	Opposition
2020	Louis Kalnpel	Did not contest		0 / 52	▼1	Extra-parliamentary
2022	Louis Kalnpel	1,119	0.85 (#17)	0 / 52	0	Extra-parliamentary
