= Boe Reve Ephraim =

Vanuatuan politician

The Honourable Ephraim Boe Reve MP

MP for Pentecost Island
- In office 2020–2022

Personal details
- Born: 13 March 1958 (age 67)
- Political party: Land and Justice Party

Boe Reve Ephraim is a Vanuatuan politician and a member of the Parliament of Vanuatu from Pentecost Island as a member of the Land and Justice Party.
