= Edmund Julun =

Vanuatuan politician

The Honourable Edmund Julun MP

MP for Malakula
- In office 2020–2022

Personal details
- Born: 15 July 1969 (age 55)
- Political party: Land and Justice Party

Edmund Julun (born 15 July 1969) is a Vanuatuan politician and a member of the Parliament of Vanuatu from Malakula as a member of the Land and Justice Party.
