= People's Services Party =

People's Services Party Pipol's Sevisis Pati
- Parliament: 0 / 52

The People's Services Party (PSP) sometimes referred to as the Peoples' Development Services Party (PDSP), is a political party in Vanuatu.

== History ==
In the 2012 general elections the party nominated three candidates, receiving 0.8% of the vote and winning one seat; Don Ken Stephen in Malakula.

In the 2016 elections the party fielded three candidates again, with Ken re-elected in Malekula.
