= Leonard Joshua Pikioune =

Vanuatuan politician

The Honourable Leonard Joshua Pikioune MP

MP for Santo Rural
- In office 2020–2022

Personal details
- Born: 16 March 1989 (age 36)
- Political party: Nagriamel

Leonard Joshua Pikioune is a Vanuatuan politician and a member of the Parliament of Vanuatu from Santo Rural as a member of Nagriamel.
