= Jerry Kanas =

Vanuatuan politician

The Honourable Jerry Kanas MP

MP for Efate Rural
- In office 2016–2019

Personal details
- Died: June 24, 2019
- Political party: Leaders Party of Vanuatu

Jerry Kanas (died June 24, 2019) was a Vanuatuan politician and a member of the Parliament of Vanuatu from Efate Rural as a member of the Leaders Party of Vanuatu, running as independent.
