= Andy Job Sam =

Vanuatuan politician

The Honourable Job Sam Andy MP

MP for Paama
- In office 2020–2022

Personal details
- Born: 10 August 1968 (age 57)
- Political party: Leaders Party of Vanuatu

Andy Job Sam is a Vanuatuan politician and a member of the Parliament of Vanuatu from Paama as a member of the Leaders Party of Vanuatu. He has served as the Minister for Justice & Community Services.
