= Natatok Indigenous People's Democratic Party =

Political party in Vanuatu

The Natatok Indigenous People's Democratic Party (NIPDP), sometimes simplified to the Natatok Party, is a political party in Vanuatu.

== History ==
The NIPDP was founded in July 2011 as a re-establishment of a party that contested the 1979 elections. In the 2012 elections the party nominated six candidates, winning two of the 52 seats in Parliament; Alfred Rollen Carlot in Efate and Jonas James in Paama. The party was given a ministerial post in the government formed by Moana Carcasses Kalosil in March 2013.

In the 2016 elections the party fielded ten candidates, but was reduced to a single seat, Alickson Vira winning in Ambae.
