= Samson Samsen =

Vanuatuan politician

The Honourable Samson Samsen MP
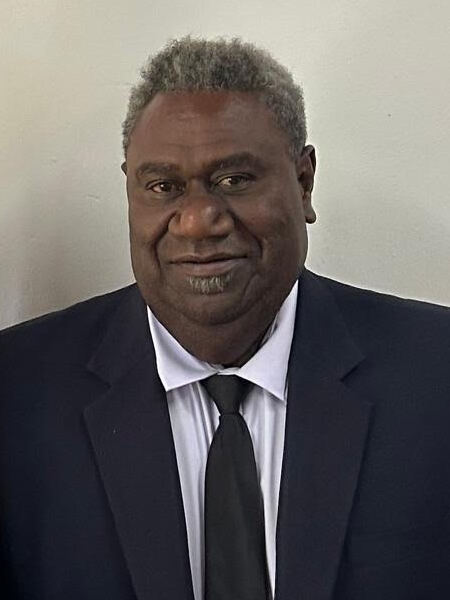
- Samsen in 2024

MP for Santo Rural
- Incumbent
- Assumed office 2008

Personal details
- Political party: Vanua'aku Pati (since 2022)

Samson Samsen is a Ni-Vanuatu politician and a member of the Parliament of Vanuatu from Santo Rural. He has served as the Minister for Tourism, Trade, Commerce, & Ni-Vanuatu Business.

== Early career ==
After studying at the Vanuatu Institute of Technology, Samsen was the president of the National Youth Council for seven years. He also served as Chairman of the Board of Directors of the Northern Islands Stevedoring Company Limited (NISCOL), a company based on the island of Espiritu Santo and which responsible for loading, unloading and trans-shipment of sea freight between the island and the other islands in the north of the country.

== Politics ==
Samsen entered the Parliament of Vanuatu as a member of the constituency covering the rural part of Espiritu Santo (i.e. the entire island except the urban center of Luganville) in the 2008 general election as a member of the Vanuatu Republican Party. During the 2008-2012 legislature, he changed sides and in 2011 became a member of Joshua Kalsakau's Vanuatu Labour Party. From 20 to 22 June 2011, he was the Minister of Agriculture, Forestry and Fisheries in the Natapei V government, an interim coalition government formed by Edward Natapei during a period of strong political instability. On 22 June, Samsen resigned from the government and joined the parliamentary opposition led by Sato Kilman.

He chose join Nagriamel for his re-election in 2012, and was appointed Minister of Civil Aviation in the Kilman IV government in November. In March 2013 he left the government and joined the opposition, helping to bring down the government. As a backbencher supporting the Natuman government, he was expelled from the parliamentary majority in July 2014 (at the same time as MPs Marcellino Pipite and Tony Nari) for coming closer to the opposition. In June 2015 he was elected First Deputy Speaker of Parliament. In November 2015 he joined the Kilman V government as caretaker Minister of Youth and Sports.

Running on the Vanuatu Presidential Party ticket, Samsen retained his seat in the 2016 elections. He was re-elected as a candidate for the Vanuatu Cultural Self-reliance Movement in 2020. In the snap parliamentary elections of 2022, he was a deputy for the Vanua'aku Pati. In August 2023 he was appointed Minister of Foreign Trade in the government of Ishmael Kalsakau. In September, after changing sides during a new period of political instability, he was appointed Minister of Trade, Foreign Trade and Tourism in the new Kilman VI government. In October, he changed sides once again, joining the opposition.

On 12 August 2024, he joined the government of Charlot Salwai as Minister of Education, succeeding Anatole Hymak. Samsen won another term in 2025 as a Vanua'aku Pati candidate, and was appointed Minister of Trade and Commerce in the government of Jotham Napat.
