= Seule Simeon =

Vanuatuan politician

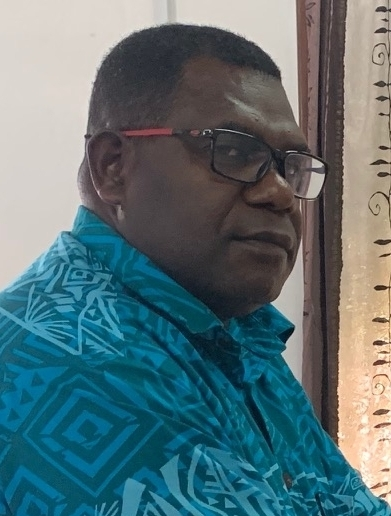
Simeon in 2020

Seoule Simeon Davidson (also spelled Seule Simeon; born 10 October 1970) is a Vanuatuan politician.

A member of Vanuatu's francophone minority, Simeon went to Lycée Louis-Antoine de Bougainville, but did not seek higher education.

In the 2016 general election, Simeon was elected Member of Parliament for Épi Island district as a member of the Union of Moderate Parties (the historically conservative party of francophones). On November 26 during a cabinet reshuffle, Prime Minister Charlot Salwai named Simeon Minister of Youth and Sports. He remained in this role until September 6, 2019, when he was elected Speaker of the Parliament.

Simeon was re-elected in the 2020 general election, this time as a member of the Reunification Movement for Change. He was named Minister of Education in the cabinet of Prime Minister Bob Loughman. In November 2020, Simeon resigned his position in the RMC to sit among the opposition benches.

He was elected for the Laverwo Party in the 2025 election, and subsequently joined the Vanua'aku Pati in accordance with the results of the 2024 Vanuatuan constitutional referendum.

Political offices
Preceded by Tallis Obed Moses	President of Vanuatu; Acting	Next: Nikenike Vurobaravu
