= Vanuatu National Development Party =

- Leader: Christophe Emelee
- Founded: July 2014
- Parliament: 0 / 52

The Vanuatu National Development Party (VNDP) is a political party in Vanuatu.

== History ==
The VNDP was formed by Christophe Emelee (an MP for the Vanuatu National Party) and Robert Bohn (leader of the Vanuatu Peoples Development Party) in 2014.

In the 2016 elections the party fielded thirteen candidates, winning two seats; Emelee in Torres and Jack Wona in Banks. In 2018, following a reshuffle in Charlot Salwai's cabinet, the party managed to enter the government with Christophe Emelee being appointed Minister for Public Utilities. In the 2020 election the party retained only Emelee's seat and remained in the opposition of Bob Loughman's government. Following the 2022 election the VNDP rose back to 2 seats and Christophe Emelee was appointed Minister of Internal Affairs in Ishmael Kalsakau's cabinet.

== Election results ==
=== Parliament ===
Election	Leader	Votes	%	Seats	+/–	Status
2016	Christophe Emelee	4,942	4.37 (#7)	2 / 52	New	Opposition
2020	Christophe Emelee	2,102	1.46 (#15)	1 / 52	▼1	Coalition
2022	Christophe Emelee	1,624	1.23 (#13)	2 / 52	▲1	Coalition
2025	Christophe Emelee	1,849	1.27 (#14)	0 / 52	▼2	Extra-parliamentary
