= Robert Bohn Sikol =

Vanuatuan politician

Robert Murray Bohn Sikol is a Vanuatuan politician. A former U.S. citizen by birth, he is one of very few naturalised citizens to become members of the Parliament of Vanuatu.

== Early life ==
Sikol was born Robert Murray Bohn in California. He came to Vanuatu (then New Hebrides) in 1978 with his family, and bought a plantation on Epi Island. He naturalised as a citizen of the country in 1997, and was adopted by the Mowa family of Lamen Island, part of the Epi parliamentary constituency. They gave him the traditional name "Sikol", meaning "bridge" in the Epi languages. As Vanuatu did not permit multiple citizenship at the time, he relinquished his U.S. citizenship in order to naturalise. His loss of U.S. citizenship was confirmed by a notice in the Federal Register as required by the Health Insurance Portability and Accountability Act in March 2000.

Sikol went on to become a director of the Vanuatu-based European Bank, and a chairman of the Vanuatu Finance Centre.

== IDM Direct Marketing ==
In May 2002, Sikol was indicted by a Memphis grand jury on charges of racketeering, conspiracy, money laundering, and mail fraud for his role in IDM, a company which sold non-U.S. lottery tickets to elderly U.S. citizens, and was arrested in December that year. Sikol's colleague Tom Bayer, also a naturalised citizen of Vanuatu, was initially confident that the charges would be thrown out, stating in January 2003 that the charge of money laundering was being applied to actions that were nothing more than "normal banking business". The National Right Wing Movement of Vanuatu was unconvinced, and urged the government to hand Bayer over to the United States government as well.

In a 2005 case before Judge Bernice B. Donald of the United States District Court for the Western District of Tennessee, Sikol was convicted on all counts. In a 2008 ruling in the Sixth Circuit, Judges Richard Fred Suhrheinrich, John M. Rogers, and Robert Holmes Bell upheld Sikol's conviction, but reversed the asset forfeiture order against him and remanded the issue to the district court for further proceedings. In a later interview with Radio Australia, Sikol stated that a decade after the matter first went to court, it was resolved with "a hundred dollars for the charges laid and some court costs".

== In politics ==
In May 2011, Sikol and Peter Mowa announced the formation of the Vanuatu Progressive Development Party, with Mowa as its secretary-general and Sikol as the party's candidate in the 2012 elections. In an interview on Television Blong Vanuatu, Sikol stated that the party hoped to promote rural development and decrease dependence on the national government.

Sikol emerged victorious in the elections in November the following year: with a voter turnout of 3,118 (77%) in the Epi constituency, he garnered 634 votes, the highest out of all candidates in the constituency, and was thus elected along with Isaac Hamariliu. His election provoked some backlash from political opponents. In December 2012, Morking Steven Iatika of Tanna Constituency proposed a constitutional amendment to bar non-indigenous citizens from election, stating that "the people of Vanuatu in the rural constituencies are not safe from people with money who can brainwash voters and rob the honesty of a ni-Vanuatu".

In February 2013, Sikol faced an election petition regarding whether he was eligible to be elected under Section 23A of the Representation of the Peoples Act, and in response filed a constitutional case. In April 2013, Chief Justice Vincent Lunabek of the Supreme Court of Vanuatu affirmed the validity of Sikol's election, ruling that regardless of whether Sikol's adoption qualified him as "a native or a person originating from that rural constituency ... who has been adopted by law or custom into a family originating from that rural constituency" as required by Section 23A, that section itself violated the guarantee in Article 5(1) of the Constitution of Vanuatu against discrimination, and did not fall within the exceptions to that article for "legitimate public interest".

He was Minister of Justice and Social Welfare from 2015 to 2016.

In June 2026, he was appointed the Minister of Health.

Sikol is married and resides in Port Vila, Vanuatu.
