= John Salong =

Ni-Vanuatu politician (born 1966)

The Honourable John Dahmasing Salong MP

Minister of Climate Change Adaptation, Meteorology and Geo-Hazards, Energy, Environment and Disaster Management of Vanuatu
- In office August 2024 – Present
- Preceded by: Ralph Regenvanu

MP for Ambrym
- Incumbent
- Assumed office 2020

Personal details
- Born: 12 October 1966 (age 58)
- Political party: Land and Justice Party

John Dahmasing Salong (born 1966) is a member of the Parliament of Vanuatu from Ambrym as a member of the Land and Justice Party. He became Minister of Climate Change Adaptation, Meteorology and Geo-Hazards, Energy, Environment and Disaster Management in August 2024. He was Minister of Finance and Economic Management from November 2022 to August 2024.
