= Gracia Shadrack =

Vanuatuan politician

Gracia Shadrack served as the Speaker of the Parliament of Vanuatu from 20 April 2020 to 15 June 2021. He represents Malakula as a member of the Leaders Party of Vanuatu.

Following a government motion to have the speaker removed, and the boycott of parliament by government MPs, Shadrack declared on 8 June 2021 that the seats of the prime minister Bob Loughman, the deputy prime minister, and 16 other MPs were vacant. Supreme Court Justice Oliver Saksak put a stay on the speaker's ruling until a court could formally consider the dispute. Shadrack resigned as speaker on 15 June 2021. The group of MPs won at the Court of Appeal on 28 October.

On 9 November 2021, the government majority passed a motion to suspend Shadrack for two years for declaring the seats vacant, citing his action as biased and a waste of public funds. Shadrack said that he would challenge the motion in court.
