= Stevens Nano Fabiano =

Vanuatuan politician

The Honourable Fabiano Nano Stevens MP

MP for Santo Rural
- In office 2020–2022

Personal details
- Born: 10 June 1976 (age 48)
- Political party: Nagriamel

Stevens Nano Fabiano is a Vanuatuan politician and a member of the Parliament of Vanuatu from Santo Rural as a member of Nagriamel.
