= Jack Wona =

Vanuatuan politician

The Honourable Jack Armstrong Wona MP

MP for Banks Islands
- In office 2016–2020

Personal details
- Born: 16 August 1965 (age 59)
- Political party: Vanuatu National Development Party

Jack Armstrong Wona (born 16 August 1965) is a Vanuatuan politician and a member of the Parliament of Vanuatu from Banks Islands as a member of the Vanuatu National Development Party.
