= Sakaes Lulu =

Vanuatuan politician

The Honourable Sakaes Lulu MP

MP for Espiritu Santo
- In office 2020–2022

Personal details
- Political party: People's Progressive Party

Sakaes Lulu is a Vanuatuan politician and a member of the Parliament of Vanuatu from Espiritu Santo as a member of the People's Progressive Party.
