= Emanuel Xavier Harry =

Vanuatuan politician

The Honourable Emanuel Xavier Harry MP

MP for Tanna Constituency
- Incumbent
- Assumed office 2022

Personal details
- Born: 9 September 1987 (age 38)
- Party: Iauko Group

Xavier Emanuel Harry is a Vanuatuan politician and a member of the Parliament of Vanuatu and a member of the Iauko Group.
