= Nato Taiwia =

Vanuatuan politician

The Honourable Nato Taiwia MP

MP for Efate Rural
- In office 2012–2020

Personal details
- Born: 19 October 1956 (age 68)
- Political party: Melanesian Progressive Party

Nato Taiwia is a Vanuatuan politician and a member of the Parliament of Vanuatu from Efate Rural as a member of the Melanesian Progressive Party.
