= Edward Nalyal Molou =

Vanuatuan politician

The Honourable Edward Nalyal Molou MP

MP for Tafea Province Outer Islands
- In office 2020–2022

Personal details
- Born: 13 August 1969 (age 55)
- Political party: Vanua'aku Pati

Edward Nalyal Molou is a Vanuatuan politician and a member of the Parliament of Vanuatu from Tafea Province Outer Islands as a member of the Vanua'aku Pati.
