= Sala John =

Vanuatuan politician

The Honourable Sala John MP

MP for Malakula
- In office 2020–2021

MP for Malakula
- In office 2016–2020

Personal details
- Born: 16 August 1965
- Died: 28 December 2021 (aged 56)
- Party: Land and Justice Party
- Education: Papua New Guinea University of Technology; University of Canberra

Sala John was a Vanuatuan politician and a member of the Parliament of Vanuatu from Malakula as a member of the Land and Justice Party.
