= Albert Abel Williams =

Vanuatuan politician

The Honourable Albert Abel Williams MP

MP
- In office 2016–2020

Albert Abel Williams is a Vanuatuan politician and a member of the Parliament of Vanuatu.
