= Andrew Solomon Napuat =

Ni-Vanuatu politician

The Honourable Andrew Solomon Napuat MP
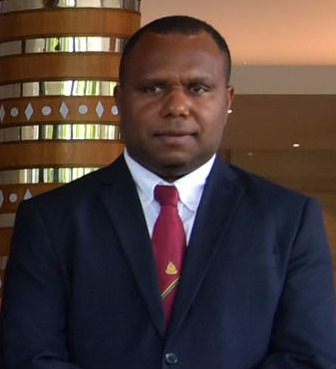
- Napuat in 2020

MP for Tanna Constituency
- In office 2016–2020

MP for Tanna Constituency
- Incumbent
- Assumed office 2022

Personal details
- Political party: Land and Justice Party

Andrew Solomon Napuat is a Ni-Vanuatu politician and a member of the Parliament of Vanuatu from Tanna Constituency as a member of the Land and Justice Party. He has served as the Minister for Internal Affairs.
