= Ulrich Sumptoh =

Vanuatuan politician

The Honourable Ulrich Sumptoh MP

MP for Port Vila
- In office 2020–2022

Personal details
- Political party: Reunification Movement for Change

Ulrich Sumptoh is a Vanuatuan politician and a member of the Parliament of Vanuatu from Port Vila as a member of the Reunification Movement for Change.
