= Johnny Koanapo =

Ni-Vanuatu politician

The Honourable Johhny Koanapo Rasou MP
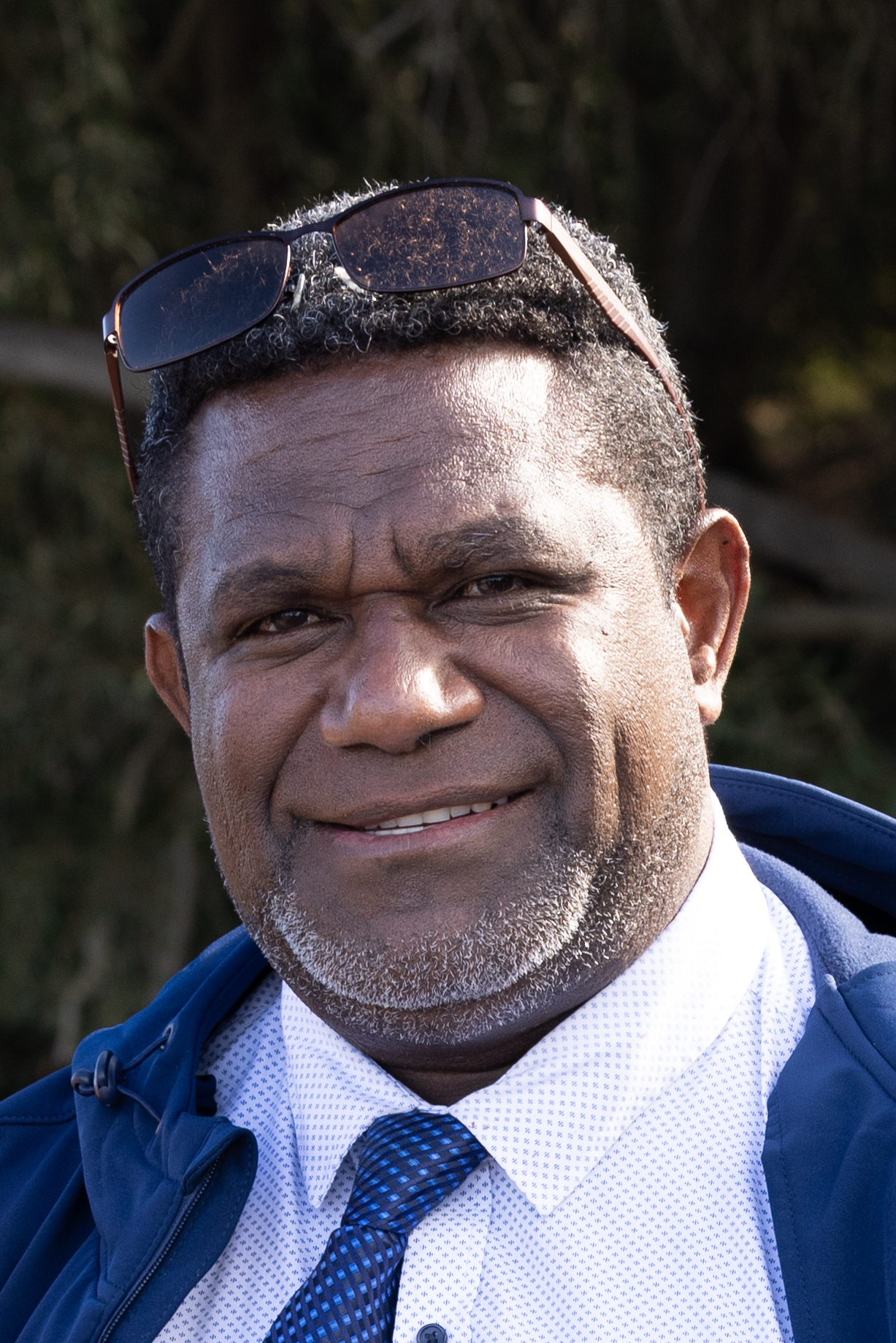
- Koanapo in 2024

Minister of Finance of Vanuatu
- Incumbent
- Assumed office September 2023
- Preceded by: John Salong
- In office April 2020 – November 2022
- Preceded by: Gaetan Pikinoune
- Succeeded by: John Salong

MP for Tanna Constituency
- Incumbent
- Assumed office 2016

Personal details
- Party: Vanua'aku Pati
- Education: University of the South Pacific; Australian National University

Johhny Koanapo Rasou is a Ni-Vanuatu politician and a member of the Parliament of Vanuatu from Tanna Constituency as a member of the Vanua'aku Pati. He hails from the island of Tanna. He was Minister of Finance from April 2020 to 2022, and again since September 2023.
