= Silas Bule =

Vanuatuan politician

The Honourable Silas Bule Melve MP

MP for Pentecost Island
- In office 2020–2022

MP for Pentecost Island
- In office 2016–2020

Personal details
- Born: 26 August 1960 (age 64)
- Political party: National United Party

Silas Bule Melve is a Vanuatuan politician and a member of the Parliament of Vanuatu from Pentecost Island as a member of the National United Party.
