= Marcellino Barthelemy =

Vanuatuan politician

The Honourable Marcellino Barthelemy MP

MP for Malakula
- In office 2020–2022

Personal details
- Born: 16 August 1972 (age 52)
- Political party: Reunification Movement for Change

Marcellino Barthelemy (born 16 August 1972) is a Vanuatuan politician and a member of the Parliament of Vanuatu from Malakula as a member of the Reunification Movement for Change.
