= Alfred Maoh =

Vanuatuan politician

The Honourable Alfred Maoh MP

MP for Santo Rural
- In office 2020–2022

Personal details
- Born: 12 September 1977 (age 48)
- Party: Land and Justice Party

Alfred Maoh (born 12 September 1977) is a ni-Vanuatu politician and a member of the Parliament of Vanuatu from Santo Rural as a member of the Land and Justice Party.
