= Ian Wilson (Vanuatuan politician) =

Vanuatuan politician

The Honourable Ian Wilson Toakalana MP
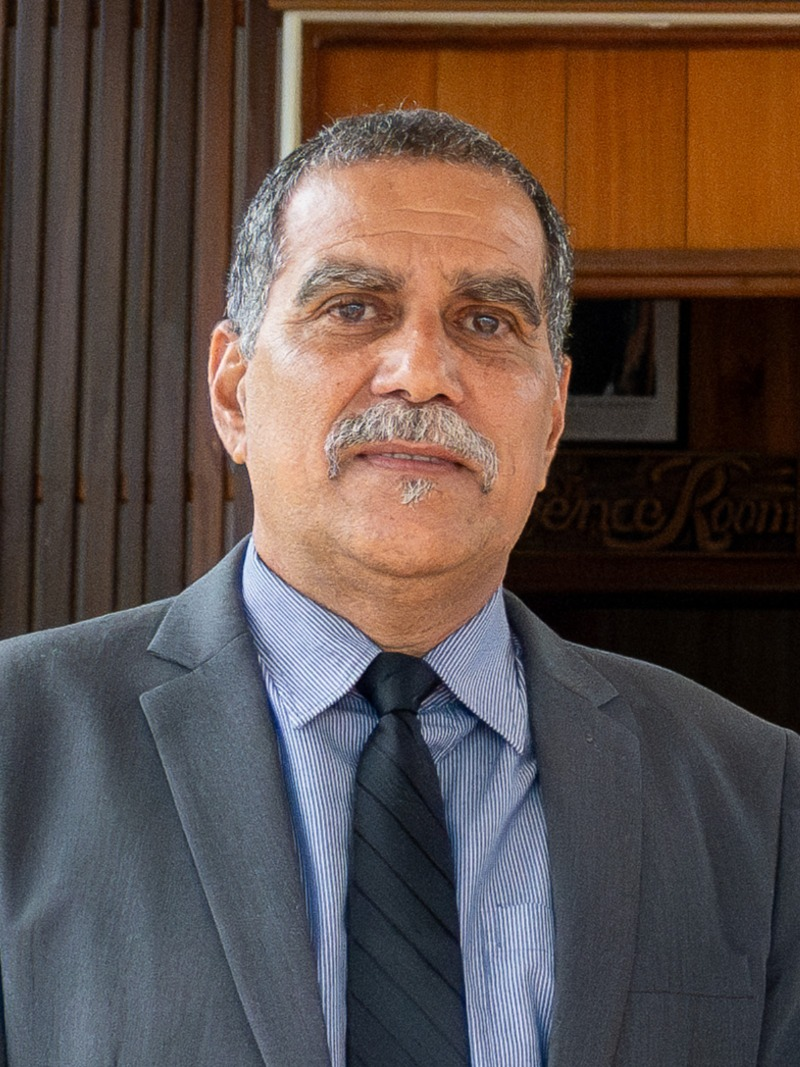
- Ian Wilson Toakalana in 2025

MP for Maewo
- In office 2016–2020

Personal details
- Born: 8 September 1965 (age 60)
- Party: Leaders Party of Vanuatu

Ian Wilson Toakalana Tarimalakesa is a Vanuatuan politician and a member of the Parliament of Vanuatu from Maewo as a member of the Leaders Party of Vanuatu.
