= Jacob Mata =

Vanuatuan politician

The Honourable Jacob Mata Tangwata MP

MP for Ambae
- In office 2016–2020

Personal details
- Born: 10 October 1959 (age 65)
- Political party: Nagriamel

Jacob Mata Tangwata is a Vanuatuan politician and a member of the Parliament of Vanuatu from Ambae as a member of Nagriamel.
