= Don Ken Stephen =

Vanuatuan politician

The Honourable Don Ken Stephen Nmalamuwomu MP

MP for Malakula
- In office 2008–2020

Personal details
- Born: 6 June 1960 (age 64)
- Political party: People's Services Party

Don Ken Stephen Nmalamuwomu is a Vanuatuan politician and a member of the Parliament of Vanuatu from Malakula as a member of the People's Services Party.

Ken has been appointed Minister of Youth Development and Training in 2008, Minister of Health from 2010 to 2011, Minister of Ni-Vanuatu Business Development in 2011, Minister of Health in 2012, Minister of Infrastructure and Public Utilities from October 2015 to February 2016, and Minister of Justice and Community Services from November 2018 to April 2020.
