= Alickson Vira =

Vanuatuan politician

The Honourable Alickson Vira MP

MP for Ambae
- In office 2016–2020

Alickson Viralone Gamaliere is a Vanuatuan politician and a member of the Parliament of Vanuatu from Ambae.
