= Kenneth Natapei =

Vanuatuan politician

The Honourable Kenneth Natapei MP

MP for Port Vila
- In office 2020–2022

Personal details
- Born: 26 November 1980 (age 44)
- Political party: Vanua'aku Pati

Kenneth Natapei is a Vanuatuan politician and a member of the Parliament of Vanuatu from Port Vila as a member of the Vanua'aku Pati. His home island is Futuna.
