= Bruno Leingkone =

Vanuatuan politician

The Honourable Bruno Leignkone Tau MP
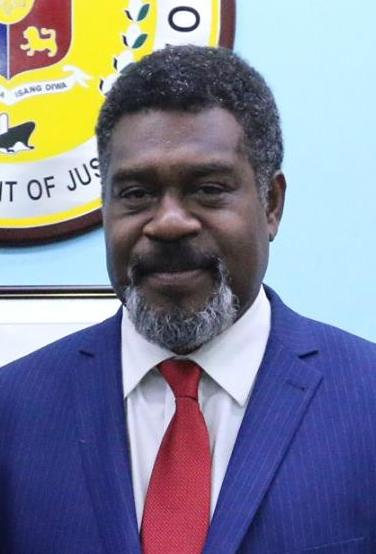
- Leingkone in 2016

MP for Ambrym
- In office 2012–2022

Personal details
- Born: 12 October 1968 (age 56)
- Political party: National United Party

Bruno Leingkone Tau was a Vanuatuan politician and a member of the Parliament of Vanuatu from Ambrym as a member of the National United Party.

== Career ==
In February 2016, Prime Minister Charlot Salwai appointed Leingkone Minister of Foreign Affairs. He was replaced by Ralph Regenvanu in 2018. In 2019, he was elected president of the NUP. Leingkone also served as Minister for Climate Change. During his tenure, he broke COVID-19 protocols, which led to a boycott of a parliamentary sitting by opposition members of parliament.

In October 2023, Speaker of Parliament Seule Simeon declared Leingkone's seat vacant after he missed three consecutive sittings without a leave of absence to receive medical treatment in South Korea. Leingkone appealed the decision to the Supreme Court, which confirmed the decision, and to the Court of Appeals, which declined to hear his appeal.
