= Christophe Emelee =

Ni-Vanuatu politician

The Honourable Claude Christophe Antonie Emelee MP

MP for Torres Constituency
- In office June 2020 – May 2023

Personal details
- Born: 9 January 1958 (age 67)
- Political party: Vanuatu National Development Party

Claude Christophe Antonie Emelee is a ni-Vanuatu politician and a member of the Parliament of Vanuatu from Torres Constituency as a member of the Vanuatu National Development Party.

He was appointed Minister of Internal Affairs in February 2014, then Minister of Justice in 2014, then Deputy Prime Minister and Minister of Agriculture in 2015, and Minister of Infrastructure from November 2018 to April 2020.
