= Leaders Party of Vanuatu =

- Leader: Jotham Napat
- Founded: 2015
- Parliament: 9 / 52
- Port Vila Municipal Council: 2 / 18

The Leaders Party of Vanuatu (LPV) is a political party in Vanuatu.

== History ==
The party was formed in 2015 by Jotham Napat, a former director general of the Ministry of Infrastructure and Public Utilities. In the 2016 elections the party fielded five candidates, winning one seat; Napat in Tanna. The party won four additional seats in the 2020 elections. In the 2022 snap election the party retained its five seats and joined Ishmael Kalsakau government coalition. After the 2025 election Napat was elected Prime Minister.

== Election results ==
=== Parliament ===
Election	Leader	Votes	%	Seats	+/–	Status
2016	Jotham Napat	2,459	2.17 (#13)	1 / 52	New	Coalition
2020	Jotham Napat	17,992	12.49 (#1)	5 / 52	▲4	Opposition
2022	Jotham Napat	9,736	7.36 (#6)	5 / 52	0	Coalition
2025	Jotham Napat	16,183	11.07 (#4)	9 / 52	▲4	Coalition
