= Land and Justice Party =

Land and Justice Party Graon mo Jastis Pati
- Leader: Ralph Regenvanu
- Founded: 11 November 2010
- Headquarters: Port Vila
- Ideology: Land reform Indigenous rights Ni-Vanuatu traditionalism
- Colors: Red, black
- Parliament: 5 / 52
- Port Vila Municipal Council: 4 / 18

Website
- graonmojastis.org

The Land and Justice Party (Bislama: Graon mo Jastis Pati; GJP) is a traditionalist, pro-indigenous and pro-youth political party in Vanuatu. The party was launched on 11 November 2010 and is led by MP Ralph Regenvanu.

The party aims to produce a generational change in Vanuatu's leadership and is concerned about foreign ownership of businesses. Upon launching the party, Regenvanu–a popular, young and independent Member of Parliament–reportedly described chiefs, churches, women and youth as the four solid legs of the party. He also stated that prospective GJP candidates for parliamentary election would be "severely tested on their record of community service", to ensure that all GJP MPs were committed to defending the public interest.

Subsequently, Regenvanu said his party advocated against people selling their land to investors and thereby depriving their children and descendants of that asset. It also supported a greater use of the customary judicial system, where chiefs act as mediators, rather than the "Western" system, which Regenvanu said often implied significant financial costs for litigants (see the article on the law of Vanuatu).

A month after launching the party, Regenvanu was appointed Minister of Cooperatives and ni-Vanuatu Business Development in the Cabinet of new prime minister Sato Kilman.

The party obtained four seats in Parliament in the October 2012 general election, the first national election it contested. Regenvanu was subsequently appointed Minister for Lands in the government headed by his ally Prime Minister Moana Carcasses Kalosil (of the Green Confederation). As Minister for Lands, Regenvanu -who described himself as a “notorious critic” of free trade and foreign ownership of lands- introduced a proposal whereby land leases would necessarily be examined by a committee, thus depriving the ministry itself of the power to lease lands without any external controls. This was a response to alleged acts of corruption carried out by previous ministers. This unprecedented reform was described as part of Regenvanu's ongoing measures against corruption. More generally, his proposals sought to "untangle a whole series of obscure rules on customary landownership", and provide clarity to landowners.

In the February 2013 provincial election, the party's Willie Fred Tasso won the presidency of the Malampa Province Provincial Government Council. The party currently participates in the government of Moana Carcasses.

The party was reportedly the first ever to field a candidate with a disability in any election in Vanuatu, when wheelchair user Arthur Simrai stood in the municipal election in Port Vila in November 2013. Regenvanu indicated that the party wished to push, in particular, for buildings to be better equipped for wheelchair access.

in the 2016 election the GJP won 7 seats, becoming the largest party and joining Charlot Salwai government coalition. The party retained its position as biggest party also in the 2020 election gaining two more seats, but it was relegated to the opposition of Bob Loughman's government.

Following Loughman's decision to call for a snap election in August 2022, the GJP joined forces with Laughman's former deputy PM, Ishmael Kalsakau and in the aftermath of the election Kalsakau was appointed prime minister with GJP's support.

== Election results ==
Parliament
Election	Leader	Votes	%	Seats	+/–	Government
2012	Ralph Regenvanu	7,241	6.02 (#5)	4 / 52	New	Coalition
2016	Ralph Regenvanu	8,376	7.41 (#3)	7 / 52	▲3	Coalition
2020	Ralph Regenvanu	14,400	10.00 (#4)	9 / 52	▲2	Opposition
2022	Ralph Regenvanu	10,183	7.70 (#4)	4 / 52	▼3	Coalition
2025	Ralph Regenvanu	9,666	6.61 (#5)	5 / 52	▲1	Coalition
