= 1988–89 Vanuatuan by-elections =

Legislative by-elections were held in Vanuatu on 12 December 1988 and 28 November 1989 to fill twenty-three vacant seats, including twenty-two made vacant by a political crisis.

== Background ==
The legislative elections of November 1987 were won by the ruling Vanua'aku Pati, which took 26 of the 46 seats in the Parliament of Vanuatu. Walter Lini, Prime Minister of Vanuatu since the country's independence in 1980, remains head of government. The Union of Moderate Parties, led by Vincent Boulekone, won the other 20 seats and remained the parliamentary opposition. Maxime Carlot replaced Vincent Boulekone as leader of the UPM and therefore as leader of the opposition shortly after.

In 1988, five deputies led by Barak Sopé left Vanua'aku Pati and created the Melanesian Progressive Party. These five were subsequently expelled from Parliament on 24 July 1988 by the Speaker Onneyn Tahi, at the request of the Lini government, invoking a 1983 law that automatically vacates the seats of MPs who change political party during the parliamentary term. Barak Sopé as well as Maxime Carlot then described Walter Lini as a “dictator”, and 18 of the 20 UPM deputies started boycotting Parliament. On 27 July, after being absent from Parliament for three consecutive days, the 18 deputies were also expelled by Tahi, who considered that they had resigned their seats. In September the Supreme Court confirmed the legality of the dismissal of the 23 MPs, opening the way to the holding of by-elections. The only two UPM deputies who were not expelled were Vincent Boulekone and Gaetano Bulewak, who refused the UPM's boycott strategy. They were subsequently excluded from the UMP and founded the Tan Union.

== Results ==
The by-elections for the eighteen seats made vacant by the expulsion of deputies from the Union of Moderate Parties are being held on 12 December 1988, the expulsion of the five dissident Vanua'aku Pati MPs having been suspended by court decision. The UPM and the Melanesian Progressive Party (PPM) are boycotting them. Only Vanua'aku Pati and Union tan present candidates. For nine of the seats, there is only one candidate. The participation rate in constituencies where there are candidates to decide is only around 40%, with opposition supporters following the boycott instructions.

The expulsion of Barak Sopé and his four fellow deputies having finally been confirmed by the courts, partial elections for these five vacant seats are being held on 28 November 1989. Here too, only the Vanua'aku Pati and the Tan Union participated, these elections being boycotted by the UPM and the PPM.

=== 1988 elections ===
Constituency	Candidate	Party	Votes	%
Ambae	Wilson Tarisevuti	Vanua'aku Pati	1,368	85.71
Ambae	Jeremiah Lingi Vira	Tan Union	228	14.29
Ambrym	Andrew Welwel	Vanua'aku Pati	1,311	73.24
Ambrym	Talsil Olsen Kai	Tan Union	479	26.76
Banks and Torres	George Baet	Vanua'aku Pati	1,342	80.84
Banks and Torres	Francis Din	Tan Union	318	19.16
Efate	Tele Taun	Vanua'aku Pati	771	56.90
Efate	Thomas David Tanarango	Vanua'aku Pati	474	34.98
Efate	Andes J. Carlot	Independent	110	8.12
Luganville	J. Kalo Nial	Vanua'aku Pati	647	72.62
Luganville	Louis Vatou	Tan Union	201	22.56
Luganville	Norman Roslyn	Independent	43	4.83
Malekula	Daniel Nato	Vanua'aku Pati	2,414	62.98
Malekula	Jown Wesley Tawi	Vanua'aku Pati	1,191	31.07
Malekula	Ignace Liatlatmal	Tan Union	228	5.95
Port Vila	Kalkot Mataskelekele	Vanua'aku Pati	Unopposed	
Port Vila	Kalanga Sawia	Vanua'aku Pati	Unopposed	
Port Vila	Jacobe Joseph	Tan Union	Unopposed	
Santo–Malo–Aore	James Vuti	Vanua'aku Pati	Unopposed	
Santo–Malo–Aore	Robert Sarki	Vanua'aku Pati	Unopposed	
Santo–Malo–Aore	Daniel Kath	Tan Union	Unopposed	
Tanna	Gideon Kota	Vanua'aku Pati	Unopposed	
Tanna	Jack Iauko	Vanua'aku Pati	Unopposed	
Tanna	Jimmy Noanikam	Tan Union	Unopposed	

=== 1989 elections ===
Constituency	Candidate	Party	Votes	%
Banks and Torres	Cecil Sinker	Vanua'aku Pati	1,473	82.99
Banks and Torres	Ben Gorqon	Tan Union	302	17.01
Epi	Tangat Yapet	Vanua'aku Pati	Unopposed	
Luganville	Seth Russon	Vanua'aku Pati	545	76.22
Luganville	Tamos Petro	Tan Union	170	23.78
Malekula	Emile Waniel	Vanua'aku Pati	2,985	95.95
Malekula	Ignace Liatlatmal	Tan Union	126	4.05
Port Vila	Thomas Faratia Brothy	Vanua'aku Pati	757	80.45
Port Vila	Gilbert Haul	Tan Union	184	19.55
Santo–Malo–Aore	Louis Vatou	Tan Union	Unopposed	
Shepherds	Etchin Shem Masoerangi	Vanua'aku Pati	731	95.68
Shepherds	Ezekiel Pakoa	Tan Union	33	4.32

== Aftermath ==
On 16 December 1988, four days after the by-elections, the President Ati George Sokomanu declared Parliament dissolved and announced that early elections would be held in February 1989. The Lini government considered this dissolution to be unconstitutional and did not take it into account. On 18 December, President Sokomanu appointed an “interim government” led by his nephew Barak Sopé. The same day, the Lini government ordered and obtained the arrest of Sokomanu, Sopé and other members of this so-called government. On 19 December, the Supreme Court of Vanuatu declared the actions of President Sokomanu unconstitutional, as the Constitution of Vanuatu does not allow the President to dissolve Parliament on his own initiative, nor to appoint a government which does not have the confidence of Parliament.

In February 1989, the courts sentenced President Sokomanu to six years in prison for inciting mutiny and seditious conspiracy. Barak Sopé and Maxime Carlot are each sentenced to five years in prison, and Willie Jimmy to three years in prison.

In September 1991, Prime Minister Lini is forced to resign following an internal rebellion within his party, and a motion of no confidence against him in Parliament. Donald Kalpokas, new leader of Vanua'aku Pati, becomes Prime Minister ahead of December elections.
