= List of people from Vanuatu =

This is a list of prominent people from Vanuatu.

== Politics and diplomacy ==
- John Bani (b. 1941), Anglican priest, President (1999-2004)
- Moana Carcasses Kalosil (b. 1963), Prime Minister (2013-2014)
- Maxime Carlot Korman (b. 1942), veteran politician, twice Prime Minister in the 1990s
- Harry Iauko (d.2012), MP for Tanna, several times minister
- Willie Jimmy, several times minister, ambassador to China
- Donald Kalpokas (b. 1943), twice Prime Minister, then Permanent Representative to the United Nations
- Ephraim Kalsakau, trade unionist and politician
- Pakoa Kaltonga, MP for Efate, several times minister
- Frederick Karlomuana Timakata (1937-1995), President (1989-1994)
- Sato Kilman (b. 1957), Prime Minister (2011-2013)
- Ham Lini (b. 1951), Prime Minister (2004-2008)
- Hilda Lini, politician, anti-nuclear campaigner, feminist
- Walter Lini (1942-1999), Anglican priest, anti-colonial leader, first Prime Minister (1979-1991)
- Willie Bongmatur Maldo (1939-2009), president of the National Council of Chiefs (1977-1993)
- Alfred Maseng (d.2004), President-elect in 2004 (election annulled)
- Kalkot Mataskelekele (b. 1949), Supreme Court justice, then President of Vanuatu (2004-2009)
- Grace Mera Molisa (1946-2002), poet, feminist, politician, signatory of the Constitution in 1979
- Sela Molisa, MP for Santo, several times minister
- Edward Natapei, twice Prime Minister in the 2000s
- Joe Natuman, several times minister
- Ralph Regenvanu (b. 1970), anthropologist, artist, politician, current Minister for Lands (2013-)
- Sethy Regenvanu (b. 1945), churchman, several times government minister
- Barak Sopé (b. 1955), Prime Minister 1999-2001
- Paul Telukluk, several times minister
- Robert Van Lierop, Permanent Representative to the United Nations in the 1980s
- Serge Vohor (b. 1955), four times Prime Minister in the 1990s and 2000s
- James Wango, MP for Ambae, Minister for Agriculture (2011)
- George Wells, several times minister

== Arts and literature ==
- Grace Mera Molisa (1946-2002), poet, feminist, politician, signatory of the Constitution in 1979
- Vanessa Quai (b. 1988), singer
- Juliette Pita (b. 1964), artist
- Ralph Regenvanu (b. 1970), anthropologist, artist, politician

== Other ==
- Dalsie Baniala, IT regulator
- Dinh Van Than, prominent businessman
- Vincent Lunabek, current Chief Justice
- Roy Mata, 13th century chief whose grave is a UNESCO World Heritage Site
- Jimmy Stevens (d.1994), leader of the secessionist Nagriamel movement in the late 1970s
