= Politics of Vanuatu =

The politics of Vanuatu take place within the framework of a constitutional democracy. The constitution provides for a representative parliamentary system. The head of the Republic is an elected president. The prime minister of Vanuatu is the head of government.

Executive power is exercised by the government. Legislative power is vested in both the government and parliament. The Judiciary is independent of the executive and the legislature.

These institutions, which date from the country's independence in 1980, exist alongside traditional systems of leadership and justice upheld by community chiefs.

Vanuatu is a democracy, whose political culture is different from that in most Western democracies, with strong elements of clientelism, corruption, and political debate that focuses strongly on the distribution of resources among communities. Governments typically comprise coalitions of numerous small parties which change regularly, with parties and MPs "crossing the floor" and prime ministers frequently being ousted in motions of no confidence.

Major political issues in Vanuatu include: customary land rights, foreign investment and the sale of citizenship to foreigners, infrastructure development, recognition of West Papua, response to natural disasters and climate change, the tackling of instability and corruption, and the safeguarding of the country's cultural heritage.

== Executive branch ==
Main office-holders
Office	Name	Party	Since
President	Nikenike Vurobaravu	Vanua'aku Pati	23 July 2022
Prime Minister	Charlot Salwai	Reunification Movement for Change	6 October 2023

The constitution created a republican political system headed by a president who has primarily ceremonial powers and is elected by a two-thirds majority in an electoral college consisting of members of Parliament and the presidents of Regional Councils. The president serves a 5-year term. The president may be removed by the electoral college for gross misconduct or incapacity.

The prime minister, who is the head of government, is elected by an absolute majority of the Parliament. The prime minister in turn appoints the Council of Ministers, whose number may not exceed a quarter of the number of parliamentary representatives. The prime minister and the Council of Ministers constitute the executive government.

=== Attorney General of Vanuatu ===
The post of Attorney General existed even before Vanuatu declared its independence in 1980. One of the last Attorneys General of New Hebrides (Vanuatu's former name), Paul Julian Treadwell (c. 1973-1977), even advocated for Vanuatu's independence.

Upon the country's declaration of independence in 1980, it was established that the Attorney General of Vanuatu is the principal legal officer for the government of Vanuatu. The duties, functions, and powers of the Attorney General are outlined in the Republic of Vanuatu's State Law Office Act [242]. The Attorney General may participate in the meetings and deliberations of the Council of Ministers so as to offer legal advice, but does not have any voting rights nor is designated as a member.

On 16 June 2025, Angelyne Roy was appointed as the 10th Attorney General of Vanuatu by President Nikenike Vurobaravu, becoming the first woman to hold the position of attorney general in the country's history.

Attorney General of Vanuatu (Complete Table)
Name	Term
Michael Gaiger	c. 1980-1982
William A. Kattan	c. 1982-1986
Silas Hakwa (1st Ni-Vanuatu male)	c. 1986-1994
Patrick Ellum	c. 1994-1996
Oliver Saksak	c. 1996-1997
Hamlinson Bulu	c. 1997-2002
Samson Endehipa	c. 2003-2006
Alatoi Ishmael Kalsakau	c. 2007-2016
Arnold Kiel Loughman	c. 2016-?
Angelyne Roy	since 16 June 2025

=== Solicitor General of Vanuatu ===
The Solicitor General of Vanuatu supervises and conducts government litigation in court. They also provides legal representation in the absence of the Attorney General of Vanuatu. As with the Attorney General, the duties, functions, and powers of the Solicitor General are outlined in the Republic of Vanuatu's State Law Office Act [242].

Although former President of Vanuatu Kalkot Mataskelekele has been identified as the first Ni-Vanuatu male to serve as the Solicitor General of Vanuatu, his service years are uncertain.

Solicitor General of Vanuatu (Incomplete Table)
Name	Term
William A. Kattan	c. 1984-1990
Oliver Saksak	c. 1995-1996
Rowan Downing	c. 1999-2002
Dudley Aru*	c. 2003-2009
Viran Molisa Trief (1st Ni-Vanuatu female)	c. 2009-2016
Frederick John Gilu	c. 2017-

*He served as the Acting Attorney General until Samson Endehipa assumed office as the Attorney General of Vanuatu.

== Legislative branch ==
Parliament or Parlement has 52 members, elected for a four-year term in multi-seat constituencies using single non-transferable voting. The president is elected for a five-year term by the parliament.

Parliament can sit for as long as four years unless dissolved by majority vote of a three-fourths quorum or a directive from the President on the advice of the prime minister.

The national Council of Chiefs, called the Malvatu Mauri and elected by district councils of chiefs, advises the government on all matters concerning ni-Vanuatu culture and language.

== Political culture ==
Vanuatu has a multi-party system of government. In the decades after independence, the English-oriented Vanua'aku Party and the French-oriented Union of Moderate Parties fragmented into numerous smaller parties, defined increasingly by personality politics rather than ideology. These have been joined by newly formed parties such as the Land and Justice Party with a strong indigenous identity.

The political culture is based around clientelism, with MPs having 'allocations' of money to spend on their constituents, and voters judging candidates primarily on their ability to bring resources into their communities rather than on national policy positions.

Though bribery is not common in everyday life in Vanuatu, its political system is widely perceived as extremely corrupt. However, as of 2018, Vanuatu enacted new legislation in order to improve access to information, opening up the government to better accountability and citizen participation. These changes have improved Vanuatu's ranking in the Corruption Perceptions Index.

There are no female MPs in the 2012-2016 parliament, and in general no female chiefs (though in some traditional Vanuatu cultures there are systems under which women can be accorded high rank).

== Judicial branch ==
The Supreme Court of Vanuatu is the superior court in Vanuatu; it consists of a chief justice and up to three other judges. Two or more members of this court may constitute a Court of Appeal. Magistrate courts handle most routine legal matters. The legal system is based on British and French law. The constitution also provides for the establishment of village or island courts presided over by chiefs to deal with questions of customary law.

== Political history ==
Historically, government and society in Vanuatu tend to divide along linguistic - French and English - lines. However, this division has become blurred in recent years due to the fragmentation of political parties and the evolution of a post-independence national identity. Political alliances in Vanuatu today are unstable and driven mostly by electoral convenience rather than ideology.

Originally, English-speaking politicians such as Walter Lini, Donald Kalpokas, and other leaders of the Vanua'aku Pati favored early independence, whereas French-speaking political leaders favored continuing association with the colonial administrators, particularly France. On the eve of independence in 1980, Jimmy Stevens' Nagriamel movement, in alliance with private French interests, declared the island of Espiritu Santo independent of the new government. Following independence, Vanuatu requested assistance from Papua New Guinea, whose forces restored order on Santo. From then until 1991, the Vanua'aku Pati and its predominantly English-speaking leadership controlled the Vanuatu Government.

In December 1991, and following a split in the Vanua'aku Pati, Maxime Carlot Korman, leader of the Francophone Union of Moderate Parties (UMP), was elected Vanuatu's first Francophone prime minister. He formed a coalition government with Walter Lini's breakaway VP faction, now named the National United Party (NUP).

Following parliamentary elections on November 30, 1995, Carlot Korman was succeeded by Serge Vohor, a dissident UMP leader. Over the next 2 years, government leadership changed several times due to unstable coalitions within the Parliament. In November 1997, the President dissolved Parliament. Following the subsequent election on March 6, 1998, Donald Kalpokas, the leader of the Vanua'aku Pati, was elected prime minister.

A vote of no confidence in November 1999 brought Barak Sopé to the fore as prime minister. Yet another vote of no confidence resulted in the selection of Edward Natapei as prime minister in March 2001. Edward Natapei returned as prime minister in the May 2002 national parliamentary elections.

In 2004, Natapei dissolved parliament, and following another national election in July of that year, Vohor became prime minister again when two members of the Vanu'aku Party defected to join a new coalition. Vohor was criticised over the establishment of diplomatic relations with China, and on December 11, Vohor was replaced as prime minister by Ham Lini in a Motion of No Confidence.

In March 2004 the term of office of President John Bani expired, and Alfred Maseng Nalo was elected in his place. It was soon discovered that Nalo was a criminal and, at the time of his election, was serving a two-year suspended sentence for aiding and abetting, misappropriation, and receiving money dishonestly after money from the sale of cocoa went missing. Had his conviction been known at the time of the election, Nalo's candidature would automatically have been invalid. The electoral commission which supervises candidates and conducts background checks on candidates did not detect the conviction because the police-issued certificate of previous offences had allegedly been completed incorrectly (Port Vila Presse Online, 28 April 2004). Nalo refused to resign, but the Supreme Court ordered his removal from office in May 2004, and the decision was subsequently confirmed by the Court of Appeal.

Following the 2008 parliamentary elections, the governing coalition was maintained, but Ham Lini was replaced as prime minister by Edward Natapei.

== See also ==
- Foreign relations of Vanuatu

== Literature ==
- Andreas Holtz: Nation-Building und die Frage nach Souveränität im Südpazifik vor dem Hintergrund der politischen Geschichte der Republik Vanuatu. Münster/Hamburg/London 2003. ISBN 3-8258-6413-8. (in German)
