= 1995 Vanuatuan general election =

General election held in Vanuatu

- 30 November 1995
- All 52 seats in Parliament; 26 seats needed for a majority
Party	Leader	Vote %	Seats	+/–
Unity Front	Donald Kalpokas	31.45	20	+5
UMP	Maxime Carlot Korman	27.44	17	−2
NUP	Walter Lin̄i	23.41	9	−1
FMP	Pisovuke Albert Ravutia	2.66	1	0
Nagriamel	Edouard Muelsul	1.76	1	0
Independents	—	6.65	2	+2
This lists parties that won seats. See the complete results below.
Results by constituency
Prime Minister before	Subsequent Prime Minister
Maxime Carlot Korman; UMP	Serge Vohor; UMP

General elections were held in Vanuatu on 30 November 1995. Ni-Vanuatu voters were invited to elect the 50 members of the national Parliament.

The Unity Front, a coalition comprising the Vanua'aku Pati (led by Donald Kalpokas), the Melanesian Progressive Party (led by Barak Sopé) and Tan Union (led by Vincent Boulekone) won 20 seats, of which the VP won 13, the MPP 5 and the TU 2. The Union of Moderate Parties, led by incumbent Prime Minister Maxime Carlot Korman, won 17. The National United Party, led by former Prime Minister Walter Lini, won 9.

The francophone Union of Moderate Parties and the anglophone National United Party formed a coalition government, with Serge Vohor (UMP) as Prime Minister and Walter Lini as deputy Prime Minister. Voter turnout was 72.4%.

== Electoral system ==
Most members were elected by single non-transferable vote in multi-seat districts of two to seven seats. Four members were elected through first-past-the-post voting ins single-member constituencies.

== Results ==
Party	Votes	%	Seats	+/–
Unity Front	23,911	31.45	20	+5
Union of Moderate Parties	20,865	27.44	17	–2
National United Party	17,795	23.41	9	–1
Friend Melanesian Party	2,019	2.66	1	0
People's Democratic Party	1,786	2.35	0	New
Nagriamel	1,337	1.76	1	0
Christian Independent Candidates	1,207	1.59	0	New
Independent Front	1,000	1.32	0	New
Vanuatu Labour Party	884	1.16	0	New
Vanuatu Women in Politics	172	0.23	0	New
Independents	5,054	6.65	2	+2
Total	76,030	100.00	50	+4
Valid votes	76,030	99.36		
Invalid/blank votes	492	0.64		
Total votes	76,522	100.00		
Registered voters/turnout	105,631	72.44		
Source: Official Gazette, Nohlen et al.

=== By constituency ===
Ambae
Candidate	Party	Votes	%
Samson Bue	Union of Moderate Parties	820	19.26
Silas Charles Hakwa	Unity Front	763	17.92
Amos Bangabiti	Union of Moderate Parties	761	17.88
James Bule	National United Party	717	16.84
Onneyn Tahi	People's Democratic Party	680	15.97
Aiden Aru Kokona	Unity Front	310	7.28
Willie Toa Ngwele	National United Party	195	4.58
Willie Vuti Toa	Independent	11	0.26
Total		4,257	100.00
Valid votes		4,257	99.42
Invalid/blank votes		25	0.58
Total votes		4,282	100.00
Registered voters/turnout		5,478	78.17

Ambrym
Candidate	Party	Votes	%
Daniel Aaron Bangtor	Unity Front	808	23.06
Amos Andeng	Union of Moderate Parties	731	20.86
Irene Leigkone Bongnaim	Union of Moderate Parties	688	19.63
Andrew Welwel	National United Party	555	15.84
Kai Patterson	Unity Front	355	10.13
Jack T. Hopa	Independent	302	8.62
Joseph Watsuh	Vanuatu Labour Party	41	1.17
William Ken	Vanuatu Labour Party	24	0.68
Total		3,504	100.00
Valid votes		3,504	98.87
Invalid/blank votes		40	1.13
Total votes		3,544	100.00
Registered voters/turnout		4,518	78.44

Banks and Torres
Candidate	Party	Votes	%
Edgel Wetin	National United Party	923	29.64
John Hughug Dickson	National United Party	854	27.42
Theodore Titus Solong	Union of Moderate Parties	629	20.20
Alfred Yemen Lobu	Unity Front	413	13.26
Cecil Sinker	Independent	250	8.03
Gideon Ronoleo	People's Democratic Party	45	1.45
Total		3,114	100.00
Valid votes		3,114	99.52
Invalid/blank votes		15	0.48
Total votes		3,129	100.00
Registered voters/turnout		3,762	83.17

Efate
Candidate	Party	Votes	%
Louis Carlot	Union of Moderate Parties	1,059	13.42
Donald Kalpokas	Unity Front	989	12.54
Chillia Jimmy Meto	Unity Front	883	11.19
Barak Sopé	Unity Front	850	10.77
Thomas Brothy Faratia	Union of Moderate Parties	765	9.70
Alfredo Roland Carlot	Unity Front	693	8.78
Kalman Kaltoi	National United Party	536	6.79
Sambo Roro	Christian Independent Candidates	466	5.91
Thomas Tarisu	Unity Front	450	5.70
Jean Claude Kanegai	Independent	329	4.17
Simeon Poilapa	National United Party	301	3.82
Willie Roman Ioba	National United Party	179	2.27
Handen Kalsakau	Vanuatu Labour Party	100	1.27
Kalmet Kalmetabil	National United Party	97	1.23
Frank Lota Numalo	Vanuatu Labour Party	97	1.23
Kalkot Mataskelekele	People's Democratic Party	76	0.96
Nerry Leitapanga Taurakoto	Vanuatu Women in Politics	19	0.24
Total		7,889	100.00
Valid votes		7,889	99.27
Invalid/blank votes		58	0.73
Total votes		7,947	100.00
Registered voters/turnout		11,324	70.18

Epi
Candidate	Party	Votes	%
Willie Olli Vara Maite	Independent	708	33.44
Lemay Kila	Union of Moderate Parties	704	33.25
Alick Michel Sokoliu	National United Party	446	21.07
Jimmy Simon	Unity Front	192	9.07
Apia Mawa	Vanuatu Labour Party	67	3.16
Total		2,117	100.00
Valid votes		2,117	99.48
Invalid/blank votes		11	0.52
Total votes		2,128	100.00
Registered voters/turnout		2,582	82.42

Luganville
Candidate	Party	Votes	%
Alfred Maseng	Union of Moderate Parties	1,437	35.78
Paolo Tabivaka	Unity Front	935	23.28
Harrison Rarua	National United Party	903	22.49
Martin Remy	National United Party	396	9.86
Seth Russen	Independent	111	2.76
Claude Tabi	Vanuatu Labour Party	91	2.27
Aindep Kensen	Christian Independent Candidates	83	2.07
Abraham Gaua	People's Democratic Party	60	1.49
Total		4,016	100.00
Valid votes		4,016	99.63
Invalid/blank votes		15	0.37
Total votes		4,031	100.00
Registered voters/turnout		6,310	63.88

Maewo
Candidate	Party	Votes	%
James Adin Tamata	Unity Front	550	41.29
Paul Ren Tari	National United Party	496	37.24
John Taokanase	Union of Moderate Parties	268	20.12
Faith Mary Boe	Vanuatu Women in Politics	18	1.35
Total		1,332	100.00
Valid votes		1,332	99.40
Invalid/blank votes		8	0.60
Total votes		1,340	100.00
Registered voters/turnout		1,467	91.34

Malekula
Candidate	Party	Votes	%
Paul Telukluk	Union of Moderate Parties	961	8.88
Sato Kilman	Unity Front	847	7.83
Gideon Fred Bakon	National United Party	845	7.81
Vital C. Soksok	Union of Moderate Parties	736	6.80
John Morrisen Willie	Unity Front	722	6.67
Josiah Bahavus	Unity Front	704	6.50
Cyriaque Metmetsan	Union of Moderate Parties	668	6.17
Aile Rantes	National United Party	623	5.76
Johnny Kalwajim	National United Party	532	4.92
Sethy Regenvanu	People's Democratic Party	513	4.74
Batick Romain	Union of Moderate Parties	508	4.69
Jacob Thyna	Friend Melanesian Party	487	4.50
Jean Baptiste Malcekan	National United Party	376	3.47
Elson Samuel	Unity Front	356	3.29
Lawa Melenamu	Unity Front	347	3.21
Esmon Saimon	Independent Front	332	3.07
Fidele Vanusoksok	Independent	309	2.86
Etienne Kombe	Unity Front	264	2.44
Anatole Lingtamat	Unity Front	217	2.00
Jerethy Rasen	Independent	196	1.81
Gideon Arrison Navat	National United Party	62	0.57
Jack Lampi	Vanuatu Labour Party	59	0.55
Naomi Malau	Vanuatu Women in Politics	42	0.39
Jeff Joel Patunvanu	Independent	42	0.39
Obed Masingiou	Vanuatu Labour Party	35	0.32
Holingson Issachar	Vanuatu Labour Party	29	0.27
Robert Obed	Independent	11	0.10
Total		10,823	100.00
Valid votes		10,823	99.24
Invalid/blank votes		83	0.76
Total votes		10,906	100.00
Registered voters/turnout		13,221	82.49

Other Southern Islands
Candidate	Party	Votes	%
Allan Navuki	Unity Front	563	39.73
Thomas J. Nentu	Union of Moderate Parties	445	31.40
Andrew Naling Pomkin	National United Party	252	17.78
Philip Naupa	Vanuatu Labour Party	60	4.23
Iarawoi Razzel	Independent	57	4.02
John Apei Mete Taki	Independent Front	28	1.98
James Naling Makenzie	Christian Independent Candidates	12	0.85
Total		1,417	100.00
Valid votes		1,417	99.58
Invalid/blank votes		6	0.42
Total votes		1,423	100.00
Registered voters/turnout		1,920	74.11

Paama
Candidate	Party	Votes	%
Demis Lango	Union of Moderate Parties	501	44.18
Reddy Henry M. Alons	Unity Front	461	40.65
Timothy Maki Massing	National United Party	161	14.20
Paul Ulas	Vanuatu Labour Party	11	0.97
Total		1,134	100.00
Valid votes		1,134	99.65
Invalid/blank votes		4	0.35
Total votes		1,138	100.00
Registered voters/turnout		1,457	78.11

Pentecost
Candidate	Party	Votes	%
Walter Lini	National United Party	1,251	21.21
Allen Bule	National United Party	948	16.08
Edouard Muelsul	Nagriamel	774	13.13
Vincent Boulekone	Unity Front	764	12.96
Abel Olul	National United Party	631	10.70
Marcel Tabius Molbwet	Union of Moderate Parties	623	10.56
Job Tabi	Unity Front	475	8.05
Edward Tabisari	People's Democratic Party	328	5.56
Solomon Ngari	Vanuatu Labour Party	74	1.25
Merilyn Temakon	Vanuatu Women in Politics	29	0.49
Total		5,897	100.00
Valid votes		5,897	99.49
Invalid/blank votes		30	0.51
Total votes		5,927	100.00
Registered voters/turnout		7,776	76.22

Port Vila
Candidate	Party	Votes	%
Maxime Carlot Korman	Union of Moderate Parties	1,056	12.60
Edward Natapei	Unity Front	898	10.72
Willie Jimmy	Union of Moderate Parties	813	9.70
Jackleen Reuben Titeks	Unity Front	801	9.56
Hilda Lini	National United Party	746	8.90
William Edgell	Unity Front	637	7.60
Willie R. A. Titongoa	National United Party	597	7.13
Wesley Takau	Unity Front	433	5.17
Daniel Lamoureux	Christian Independent Candidates	428	5.11
Manwo M. Kepoue	Union of Moderate Parties	397	4.74
Meltetamath Pechou	Unity Front	387	4.62
George Noel Alick	Independent	322	3.84
Patrick Crowby	Independent Front	293	3.50
Georges Joe	National United Party	278	3.32
Maria Kalsakau	Independent	107	1.28
Ephraim Kalsakau	Vanuatu Labour Party	71	0.85
Willie Aru	People's Democratic Party	51	0.61
Grace Mera Molisa	Vanuatu Women in Politics	37	0.44
Barton McDonald Bisiwei	Vanuatu Labour Party	14	0.17
Albert Watt	Independent	12	0.14
Total		8,378	100.00
Valid votes		8,378	99.48
Invalid/blank votes		44	0.52
Total votes		8,422	100.00
Registered voters/turnout		16,474	51.12

Santo–Malo–Aore
Candidate	Party	Votes	%
Serge Vohor	Union of Moderate Parties	1,095	10.94
Sela Molisa	Unity Front	1,053	10.52
Albert Ravutia	Friend Melanesian Party	878	8.77
Embert Jimmy	Union of Moderate Parties	852	8.51
Philip Pasvu	Unity Front	826	8.25
John Tari	National United Party	820	8.19
Louis Taribe	Union of Moderate Parties	798	7.97
George Tavuti	Union of Moderate Parties	669	6.69
Frankie Stevens	Nagriamel	563	5.63
Thomas Reuben	Unity Front	456	4.56
Andrew Moliano Vurobaravo	Friend Melanesian Party	367	3.67
Simon Faia Alomele	National United Party	331	3.31
Ezra Paul Tavue Tari	National United Party	291	2.91
Timothy Welles	Friend Melanesian Party	287	2.87
Paul William Ian Saul	Christian Independent Candidates	218	2.18
Philibert Raupepe	Independent Front	196	1.96
Marama Vanua	Unity Front	128	1.28
Daniel Tas	Unity Front	51	0.51
Tao Mathew Perefon	Vanuatu Labour Party	44	0.44
Judy	Vanuatu Labour Party	40	0.40
Rone Alick	Vanuatu Women in Politics	27	0.27
Philip Pakoro	Vanuatu Labour Party	17	0.17
Total		10,007	100.00
Valid votes		10,007	99.23
Invalid/blank votes		78	0.77
Total votes		10,085	100.00
Registered voters/turnout		12,332	81.78

Shepherds–Tongoa
Candidate	Party	Votes	%
David Robert Karie	National United Party	669	31.38
John Moris Lee Solomon	Union of Moderate Parties	581	27.25
Amos Titonga	Unity Front	506	23.73
Timothy Willie Timakura	National United Party	376	17.64
Total		2,132	100.00
Valid votes		2,132	99.53
Invalid/blank votes		10	0.47
Total votes		2,142	100.00
Registered voters/turnout		2,391	89.59

Tanna
Candidate	Party	Votes	%
Keasipai Song	Union of Moderate Parties	919	9.18
Jeffry Lava	Unity Front	881	8.80
Joe Natuman	Unity Front	841	8.40
Shem Naukaut	National United Party	786	7.85
Charley Nako	Union of Moderate Parties	750	7.49
Henry Iauko	Unity Front	737	7.36
Naunun Harris Iarris	Independent	709	7.08
Jimmy Nicklam	Unity Front	696	6.95
Iolu Abil	Unity Front	669	6.68
Jacques Nirua	Union of Moderate Parties	631	6.30
David Nikiau Kalanga	Independent	609	6.08
Joe Narua	National United Party	552	5.51
Charley Nango	Independent	473	4.72
Mark Iautu	Independent	405	4.04
Natonga Saby	Independent Front	151	1.51
Kisel Lop	Independent	91	0.91
Jack Malia	National United Party	70	0.70
John Sawia	People's Democratic Party	18	0.18
Nitani Peres	People's Democratic Party	15	0.15
George Noka	Vanuatu Labour Party	10	0.10
Total		10,013	100.00
Valid votes		10,013	99.36
Invalid/blank votes		65	0.64
Total votes		10,078	100.00
Registered voters/turnout		14,619	68.94

== See also ==
- List of members of the Parliament of Vanuatu (1995–1998)
