= 1991 Vanuatuan general election =

← 1987	2 December 1991	1995 →
- All 46 seats in Parliament; 23 seats needed for a majority
- Turnout: 71.33%
Party	Leader	Vote %	Seats	+/–
UMP	Maxime Carlot Korman	30.58	19	0
Vanua'aku Pati	Donald Kalpokas	22.61	10	−16
National United	Walter Lini	20.38	10	New
Melanesian Progressive	Barak Sopé	15.38	4	New
Tan Union		4.59	1	New
Nagriamel	Jimmy Stevens	2.93	1	+1
Friend Melanesian		1.86	1	0
This lists parties that won seats. See the complete results below.
Prime Minister before	Prime Minister after
Donald Kalpokas; Vanua'aku	Maxime Carlot Korman; Union of Moderate Parties

General elections were held in Vanuatu on 2 December 1991. Ni-Vanuatu voters were invited to elect the 46 members of the national Parliament.

At the time of the elections, Walter Lini of the Vanua'aku Pati had been prime minister for eleven years and the country's only leader since independence in 1980. Several months before the elections, he was replaced by Donald Kalpokas as leader of the Vanua'aku Pati, and formed his own National United Party.

Seven parties contested the election. The Union of Moderate Parties obtained 19 seats, the same number as during the previous election, but this time these were sufficient to place it in the lead. The Vanua'aku Pati and the National United Party obtained ten seats each, marking the VP's first electoral defeat.

With no absolute majority, the Union of Moderate Parties formed a ruling coalition with the NUP. Maxime Carlot Korman (UMP) became Vanuatu's first francophone Prime Minister, with NUP co-founder Sethy Regenvanu as deputy Prime Minister. Voter turnout was 71%.

The result was significant, as Vanuatu's previous post-independence governments had been oriented towards the Anglophone population. Prior to the 1991 elections, only ten percent of the Vanuatu administration was Francophone and no cabinet members had been Francophone since independence. Vanuatu's foreign policy had also been hostile to France.

== Electoral system ==
Most members were elected by single non-transferable vote in multi-seat districts having two to six members each. Four members were elected through first-past-the-post voting in single-member constituencies.

== Results ==
Party	Votes	%	Seats	+/–
Union of Moderate Parties	19,016	30.58	19	0
Vanua'aku Pati	14,058	22.61	10	–16
National United Party	12,672	20.38	10	New
Melanesian Progressive Party	9,562	15.38	4	New
Tan Union	2,852	4.59	1	New
Nagriamel	1,822	2.93	1	+1
Friend Melanesian Party	1,157	1.86	1	0
New People's Party	588	0.95	0	0
Vanuatu Independent Francophone	77	0.12	0	New
Independents	377	0.61	0	0
Total	62,181	100.00	46	0
Valid votes	62,181	99.40		
Invalid/blank votes	375	0.60		
Total votes	62,556	100.00		
Registered voters/turnout	87,695	71.33		
Source: Official Gazette, Nohlen et al.

=== By constituency ===
Ambae
Candidate	Party	Votes	%
Onneyn Tahi	National United Party	725	18.99
Amos Bangabiti	Union of Moderate Parties	688	18.02
Samson Bue	Union of Moderate Parties	675	17.68
Harold Colin Qualao	Vanua'aku Pati	494	12.94
Keith Andrew Mala	Vanua'aku Pati	422	11.05
Frank Bakeo Spooner	Melanesian Progressive Party	409	10.71
John Tari Morris	Nagriamel	188	4.92
Wilson Tarisevuti	National United Party	145	3.80
Peter Ngwele	Independent	58	1.52
Fred Toka	Tan Union	14	0.37
Total		3,818	100.00
Valid votes		3,818	99.17
Invalid/blank votes		32	0.83
Total votes		3,850	100.00
Registered voters/turnout		5,067	75.98

Ambrym
Candidate	Party	Votes	%
Batick Blaise	Union of Moderate Parties	1,039	32.23
Jack T. Hopa	Vanua'aku Pati	558	17.31
Daniel Bangtor Arron	Vanua'aku Pati	536	16.63
Kai Patterson	Melanesian Progressive Party	527	16.35
Olsen Talsil	Tan Union	299	9.27
Willie Malon	National United Party	265	8.22
Total		3,224	100.00
Valid votes		3,224	99.35
Invalid/blank votes		21	0.65
Total votes		3,245	100.00
Registered voters/turnout		4,550	71.32

Banks and Torres
Candidate	Party	Votes	%
Cecil Sinker	National United Party	837	31.63
Derek Lulum Vanua	National United Party	707	26.72
Eldat Esuva Fox	Union of Moderate Parties	514	19.43
Charles Godden	Melanesian Progressive Party	278	10.51
Ben Reynold	Tan Union	224	8.47
George Augustus Worek	Vanua'aku Pati	86	3.25
Total		2,646	100.00
Valid votes		2,646	98.99
Invalid/blank votes		27	1.01
Total votes		2,673	100.00
Registered voters/turnout		3,487	76.66

Efate
Candidate	Party	Votes	%
Barak Sopé	Melanesian Progressive Party	1,121	18.24
Donald Kalpokas	Vanua'aku Pati	946	15.39
Jimmy Meto Chilia	Vanua'aku Pati	922	15.00
Louis Carlot	Union of Moderate Parties	667	10.85
Thomas Tarisu	Melanesian Progressive Party	612	9.96
Kalpokor Kalsakau	Union of Moderate Parties	599	9.75
John Willie Kalotiti	Melanesian Progressive Party	417	6.78
Joel Pakoa Lao Mansale	Independent	233	3.79
Andrew Bakoa Kalpolep	National United Party	188	3.06
Saniel D. Popovi	Tan Union	177	2.88
Kalmari Kolen Soromon	National United Party	136	2.21
David Thomas Tanarango	National United Party	76	1.24
George Kalsakau	Independent	45	0.73
Pita Nako	Vanuatu Independent Francophone	7	0.11
Total		6,146	100.00
Valid votes		6,146	99.47
Invalid/blank votes		33	0.53
Total votes		6,179	100.00
Registered voters/turnout		8,925	69.23

Epi
Candidate	Party	Votes	%
Jimmy Simon	Melanesian Progressive Party	583	36.12
Joshua Vakumali	Vanua'aku Pati	518	32.09
Jack Waiwo Iolupua	Union of Moderate Parties	393	24.35
Sam Wesley Niel	National United Party	120	7.43
Total		1,614	100.00
Valid votes		1,614	99.81
Invalid/blank votes		3	0.19
Total votes		1,617	100.00
Registered voters/turnout		2,123	76.17

Luganville
Candidate	Party	Votes	%
Edward Tambisari	National United Party	758	25.07
Alfred Maseng	Union of Moderate Parties	677	22.39
Noah Bihu	Union of Moderate Parties	651	21.53
Kalo J. Nial	Vanua'aku Pati	479	15.85
Jimmy Awa	Melanesian Progressive Party	242	8.01
Noel Michel	Tan Union	139	4.60
Jimmy Homal	New People's Party	77	2.55
Total		3,023	100.00
Valid votes		3,023	99.51
Invalid/blank votes		15	0.49
Total votes		3,038	100.00
Registered voters/turnout		5,011	60.63

Maewo
Candidate	Party	Votes	%
James Adin Tamata	Vanua'aku Pati	329	30.21
Roger Jerry Boe	National United Party	321	29.48
Jonah Tali	Union of Moderate Parties	222	20.39
Gregory Taranban	Melanesian Progressive Party	217	19.93
Total		1,089	100.00
Valid votes		1,089	99.63
Invalid/blank votes		4	0.37
Total votes		1,093	100.00
Registered voters/turnout		1,253	87.23

Malekula
Candidate	Party	Votes	%
Paul Telukluk	Union of Moderate Parties	987	10.12
Jerrety Rasen	Union of Moderate Parties	927	9.51
Soksok Vital	Union of Moderate Parties	891	9.14
Sethy Regenvanu	National United Party	788	8.08
Elson Samuel	Melanesian Progressive Party	728	7.47
Batick Romain	Union of Moderate Parties	711	7.29
Daniel Nato	Vanua'aku Pati	567	5.81
Simeon Ennis	Vanua'aku Pati	567	5.81
Anatol Lingtamat	Melanesian Progressive Party	558	5.72
Ailes Rantes	National United Party	489	5.01
Emile Waniel	National United Party	474	4.86
Daniel Wasing	National United Party	404	4.14
Josephat Mellai La'au	Vanua'aku Pati	366	3.75
Albert Alpet	Friend Melanesian Party	313	3.21
Raymond L. N. Malapa	Vanua'aku Pati	301	3.09
Alfred Lowane	Melanesian Progressive Party	238	2.44
Tawi John Wesley	National United Party	229	2.35
Ignace Liatlatmal	Tan Union	214	2.19
Total		9,752	100.00
Valid votes		9,752	99.53
Invalid/blank votes		46	0.47
Total votes		9,798	100.00
Registered voters/turnout		11,941	82.05

Other Southern Islands
Candidate	Party	Votes	%
Edward Natapei	Vanua'aku Pati	653	51.34
John Thomas Nentu	Union of Moderate Parties	378	29.72
Robert Nasawai	Melanesian Progressive Party	241	18.95
Total		1,272	100.00
Valid votes		1,272	99.69
Invalid/blank votes		4	0.31
Total votes		1,276	100.00
Registered voters/turnout		1,592	80.15

Paama
Candidate	Party	Votes	%
Demis Lango	Union of Moderate Parties	414	44.61
Reddy Henry Sahe	Vanua'aku Pati	378	40.73
William Mahit	National United Party	95	10.24
Tom Toungen	Melanesian Progressive Party	41	4.42
Total		928	100.00
Valid votes		928	99.36
Invalid/blank votes		6	0.64
Total votes		934	100.00
Registered voters/turnout		1,512	61.77

Pentecost
Candidate	Party	Votes	%
Walter Lini	National United Party	1,279	25.18
Allen Bule	National United Party	813	16.01
Vincent Boulekone	Tan Union	755	14.87
Job Bulewu	National United Party	475	9.35
Job Tabi	Nagriamel	470	9.25
Gaetano Bulewak	Tan Union	386	7.60
Pierre Chanel Vuti	Union of Moderate Parties	312	6.14
William Edgell	Melanesian Progressive Party	290	5.71
Marcel Tabius	Union of Moderate Parties	202	3.98
Martín Tamata	Vanua'aku Pati	97	1.91
Total		5,079	100.00
Valid votes		5,079	99.28
Invalid/blank votes		37	0.72
Total votes		5,116	100.00
Registered voters/turnout		6,806	75.17

Port Vila
Candidate	Party	Votes	%
Thomas Brothy Faratia	Vanua'aku Pati	777	13.87
Maxime Carlot Korman	Union of Moderate Parties	715	12.77
Willie Jimmy	Union of Moderate Parties	644	11.50
Alick Hopman Allan	Vanua'aku Pati	558	9.96
Hilda Lini	National United Party	545	9.73
Maria Crowby	Union of Moderate Parties	510	9.11
Kalkot Mataskelekele	National United Party	402	7.18
Henri Thuha	Melanesian Progressive Party	379	6.77
Ati George Sokomanu	Melanesian Progressive Party	365	6.52
Joseph Jacobet	Tan Union	290	5.18
Leo Hardy	New People's Party	252	4.50
David Kalanga Sawia	National United Party	68	1.21
Albert Watt	Vanuatu Independent Francophone	55	0.98
Williamson Obed Naros	Independent	41	0.73
Total		5,601	100.00
Valid votes		5,601	99.52
Invalid/blank votes		27	0.48
Total votes		5,628	100.00
Registered voters/turnout		10,108	55.68

Santo–Malo–Aore
Candidate	Party	Votes	%
Serge Vohor	Union of Moderate Parties	1,000	12.59
Sela Molisa	Vanua'aku Pati	936	11.78
Albert Ravutia	Friend Melanesian Party	844	10.62
Timothy Welles	Union of Moderate Parties	733	9.23
Molieno Vurobaravu	Union of Moderate Parties	523	6.58
Frankie Stevens	Nagriamel	487	6.13
Harry Karaeru	Union of Moderate Parties	440	5.54
Talper Nial	Vanua'aku Pati	399	5.02
Jerry Isaiah	Nagriamel	393	4.95
Sarki Robert	Vanua'aku Pati	392	4.93
Thomas Reuben	Melanesian Progressive Party	372	4.68
Pierre Leon Aisoso	Nagriamel	284	3.57
B. Samson Livo	National United Party	274	3.45
Perei Rukon	National United Party	195	2.45
Tamata Mele	Melanesian Progressive Party	194	2.44
Ishmael Williams Avia	National United Party	188	2.37
Kavcor Wass	National United Party	177	2.23
Louis Vatu	Tan Union	114	1.43
Total		7,945	100.00
Valid votes		7,945	99.11
Invalid/blank votes		71	0.89
Total votes		8,016	100.00
Registered voters/turnout		10,043	79.82

Shepherds–Tongoa
Candidate	Party	Votes	%
Joseph Calo	Union of Moderate Parties	434	19.83
Robert David Karie	National United Party	431	19.69
Etschin Shem Masoeripu	National United Party	344	15.71
Amos G. Titongoa	Vanua'aku Pati	290	13.25
Daniel Konkona	Melanesian Progressive Party	259	11.83
Mark L. Taripoakoto	New People's Party	259	11.83
Willie Roy Haruel	Tan Union	102	4.66
Jack Noviel Taripoaliu	Vanua'aku Pati	70	3.20
Total		2,189	100.00
Valid votes		2,189	99.23
Invalid/blank votes		17	0.77
Total votes		2,206	100.00
Registered voters/turnout		3,016	73.14

Tanna
Candidate	Party	Votes	%
Iolu Abil	Vanua'aku Pati	1,052	13.39
Charlie Nako	Union of Moderate Parties	904	11.51
Henry Iouiou	Vanua'aku Pati	863	10.99
Jeffery Lahva	Melanesian Progressive Party	840	10.69
Koeasipai Song	Union of Moderate Parties	806	10.26
Lop Kissel	Union of Moderate Parties	724	9.22
Tom Kawai	Union of Moderate Parties	636	8.10
George Manu	Melanesian Progressive Party	628	7.99
Daniel Iamiam	National United Party	516	6.57
Gideon Kota	Vanua'aku Pati	502	6.39
Tom Numake	National United Party	208	2.65
Jimmy Noanikam	Tan Union	138	1.76
Willie Korisa	Melanesian Progressive Party	23	0.29
Nagia Willy	Vanuatu Independent Francophone	15	0.19
Total		7,855	100.00
Valid votes		7,855	99.59
Invalid/blank votes		32	0.41
Total votes		7,887	100.00
Registered voters/turnout		12,261	64.33

== See also ==
- List of members of the Parliament of Vanuatu (1991–1995)
