= List of parliamentary constituencies of Vanuatu =

The Parliament of Vanuatu (Bislama: Palamen blong Vanuatu; French: Parlement du Vanuatu) is the unicameral legislative body of the Republic of Vanuatu. It was established by the 1980 constitution, as part of Vanuatu's independence from France and the United Kingdom.

The President, as a figurehead, may not veto parliamentary legislation, unless he considers it may be contrary to the constitution, in which case he may refer it to the Supreme Court, and veto it only if the Supreme Court declares it to be contrary to the constitution. The parliament is composed of fifty-two members, directly elected by citizens from multi-member constituencies for a four-year term.

== List ==
Constituency	Members elected	Electorate (2022)
Torres	1	3,433
Banks	1	5,981
Santo	7	44,101
Luganville	2	18,018
Malo/Aore	1	5,134
Malekula	7	28,307
Paama	1	1,543
Ambrym	2	8,435
Ambae	3	11,167
Maewo	1	3,438
Pentecost	4	18,155
Epi	2	6,807
Tongoa	1	2,647
Shepherds	1	1,495
Efate	5	46,888
Port Vila	5	50,151
Tanna	7	41,945
Tafea Outer Islands	1	4,613
Total	52	302,258
Source: Vanuatu Electoral Office
