= Jean-Marie Léyé =

President of Vanuatu from 1994 to 1999

His Excellency Jean-Marie Léyé

President of Vanuatu
- In office 2 March 1994 – 2 March 1999
- Prime Minister: Donald Kalpokas; Maxime Carlot Korman; Serge Vohor
- Preceded by: Fred Timakata; Alfred Maseng (acting)
- Succeeded by: Edward Natapei (acting); John Bani

Personal details
- Born: 1932 Aneityum, New Hebrides Condominium
- Died: 9 December 2014 (aged 81–82)
- Party: Union of Moderate Parties

Jean-Marie Léyé Lenelgau (1932 – 9 December 2014) was a Vanuatuan politician and the president of Vanuatu from 2 March 1994 to 2 March 1999.
Léyé was the first, and only, French-speaker to have held the presidency of Vanuatu in history.

== Biography ==
In 1976, the nation of Vanuatu was the Franco-British New Hebrides Condominium. Léyé was one of the founders and the first president of the Union of New Hebrides Communities (UCNH), an indigenous French-speaking movement formed in response to the National Party, a nationalist movement dominated by anglophones. While the National Party, under the leadership of Walter Lini, advocated for a rapid move of the New Hebrides toward independence, the UCNH advocated a more gradual transfer of power from colonial authorities "in order to prepare this transition under better conditions.” The popularity of the National Party, however, led to the independence of the country (which became Vanuatu) in 1980. The UCNH became the Union of Moderate Parties, the main political opposition force.

On 2 March 1994, Léyé was elected President of the Republic, a ceremonial and essentially symbolic role in this parliamentary republic. He was the first francophone to hold this position. On 12 October 1996, he was briefly kidnapped by members of the Vanuatu Mobile Force, the paramilitary national defense service, which was protesting against unpaid funding. He was released the same day. It is the “only coup in the country's history”.

In 1995, he publicly opposed the resumption of French nuclear tests in the Pacific. He called on France's "duty [to] guarantee a healthy environment" in the Pacific. His prime minister, Maxime Carlot Korman, wished to maintain close and friendly relations with France, while himself also opposing nuclear tests.

At the end of 1997, Maxime Carlot Korman, now a simple deputy, tabled a censure motion in Parliament in an attempt to dismiss the government of Prime Minister Serge Vohor. President Léyé spoke on November 27 at the request of Serge Vohor and dissolved the Parliament, preventing the vote on the motion. This decision was controversial. Léyé explained himself by saying that the repeated motions of censure in Parliament were a source of political instability, and that he acted in good conscience without his act in any way being dictated by the prime minister. The dissolution of the Parliament was at first invalidated by the judiciary, but the decision of Léyé was later confirmed and restored by the Court of Appeals on 9 January 1998. The early elections caused by this dissolution were lost by Serge Vohor; Donald Kalpokas of Vanua'aku Pati became the new prime minister.

Jean-Marie Léyé's presidential term expired on 2 March 1999. He was later succeeded by John Bani.
