= 2009 Vanuatuan presidential election =

Election of Iolu Abil

An indirect presidential election was held in Vanuatu on 1 September and 2 September 2009. The electors are the 52 MPs and the six heads of provincial governments; ten signatures of support are required for nomination. Outgoing president Kalkot Mataskelekele was renominated for a second term, but Iolu Abil ultimately succeeded in winning a five-year term after three rounds of voting by the electoral college.

== Election background ==
Kalkot Mataskelekele's five-year term as President of Vanuatu ended on August 16, 2009. The Speaker of Parliament Maxime Carlot Korman was sworn in as acting President until Mataskelekele's successor could be elected.

Under the Constitution, the President of Vanuatu is elected by the 58 member electoral college, which is composed of the 52 members of Parliament as well as the six heads of each of the provincial governments of Vanuatu (Malampa, Penama, Sanma, Shefa, Tafea and Torba). A presidential candidate must win two-thirds of the electoral college in order to be elected president. According to the Constitution, the presidential election must be held within three weeks after the previous office holder's term expires.

The government of Vanuatu allocated approximately US$70,000 to cover the costs of the 2009 presidential election.

=== Candidates ===
Fifteen candidates seeking the presidency submitted their names to the electoral office – two women and thirteen men. However, only eleven candidates were ultimately found to be eligible to stand for election.

The eleven eligible candidates for President were:

- Iolu Abil
- Vincent Boulekone
- Leas Manu Cullwick
- Enias Liatlatmal
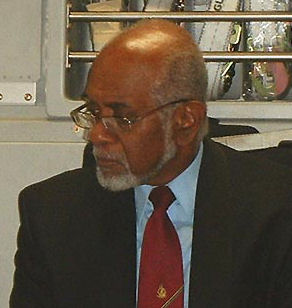
  Former President Kalkot Mataskelekele was nominated for a second term
- David Lovis
- Kalkot Mataskelekele
- Kalo Nial
- Yvette Sam
- Luke Siba
- Belton Seth
- Jacques Sese

== Election ==
Eleven candidates, including two women, stood in the first round of the election on 1 September 2009 (fifteen had filed, but four of them were not eligible to stand). Vincent Boulekone won 16 votes, Mataskelekele won 14 votes and Iolu Abil won 11 votes. Kalo Nial and female candidate Yvette Sam both won seven votes. As 39 votes were required to be elected, a second round was set for 2 September 2009. The government claimed that its votes had been split between various candidates as the government had decided to allow individual MPs to decide whom to vote for in the first round, so that respect could be shown to previous leaders.

The second round was also inconclusive, but in the third round (also on 2 September), Iolu Abil was elected with 41 votes. There were only six other candidates remaining in the third round. Abil was supported by the government (he was the PM's preference, while the deputy Prime Minister Ham Lini would have preferred to reelect Mataskelekele).

=== Results ===
First round

- Vincent Boulekone – 16 votes
- Kalkot Mataskelekele – 14 votes
- Iolu Abil – 11 votes
- Kalo Nial – 7 votes
- Yvette Sam – 7 votes

Second round

- Iolu Abil – 26 votes
- Kalkot Mataskelekele – 16 votes
- Vincent Boulekone – 16 votes

Third round

- Iolu Abil – 41 votes
- Kalkot Mataskelekele – 16 votes
