= Josias Moli =

Vanuatuan politician

Josias Moli (born 19 August 1954) is a Vanuatuan politician who served as speaker of the Parliament of Vanuatu and acting president of Vanuatu.

== Biography ==
He succeeded Roger Abiut in both positions. He is a member of the Union of Moderate Parties and was elected speaker of parliament after Abiut was defeated in parliamentary elections earlier in July 2004. In Vanuatu the speaker of parliament serves as the acting president when Parliament has not elected a new president, which was necessary after the impeachment of Alfred Maseng. Moli lost the position of acting president when Parliament and regional presidents were able to elect a new president on August 16, 2004. Moli was the fourth person to serve as President of Vanuatu in four months.?

He was succeeded by Kalkot Mataskelekele, who was elected president by the electoral college. Moli also lost the position of speaker in December 2004, when the government of Serge Vohor, a member of his party, was replaced by a government under the leadership of Ham Lini. Moli is still a member of the Vanuatu parliament.
