= Philip Boedoro =

Vanuatuan politician

Philip Morris Boedoro

Acting President of Vanuatu
- In office 3 September 2014 – 22 September 2014
- Prime Minister: Joe Natuman
- Preceded by: Iolu Abil
- Succeeded by: Baldwin Lonsdale

Speaker of the Parliament
- In office 6 April 2013 – 16 June 2015
- Preceded by: George Wells
- Succeeded by: Marcellino Pipite

Member of the Parliament
- In office 2008–2016
- Constituency: Maewo
- In office 2002–2004
- Constituency: Maewo

Personal details
- Born: 21 May 1958 (age 68)
- Party: Vanua'aku Pati

Philip Morris Boedoro (born 21 May 1958) is a Vanuatuan politician.

He was first elected to the parliament of Vanuatu in 2002 as a representative of Maewo. He returned to the legislature in 2008, and was reelected in 2012. From April 2013 to June 2015, Boedoro served as speaker of the Parliament of Vanuatu. He was acting president of Vanuatu in September 2014. In his capacity as speaker, Boedoro dismissed sixteen parliamentarians, all of whom filed a lawsuit against him. Boedoro's appeal of the case was dismissed in May 2015.
