= Baldwin Lonsdale =

President of Vanuatu from 2014 to 2017

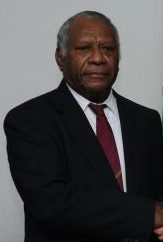
- Lonsdale in 2015

President of Vanuatu
- In office 22 September 2014 – 17 June 2017
- Prime Minister: Joe Natuman; Sato Kilman; Charlot Salwai
- Preceded by: Iolu Abil; Philip Boedoro (acting)
- Succeeded by: Esmon Saimon (acting); Tallis Obed Moses

Personal details
- Born: Baldwin Jacobson Lonsdale; 5 August 1948 Mota Lava, Banks Islands, New Hebrides (now Vanuatu)
- Died: 17 June 2017 (aged 68) Port Vila, Vanuatu
- Resting place: Parliament Complex Grounds, Port Vila, Efate, Vanuatu
- Party: Independent
- Education: St John's College
- Occupation: Anglican priest, civil servant, politician

Baldwin Jacobson Lonsdale (5 August 1948 – 17 June 2017) was a Vanuatuan politician and Anglican priest who served as the president of Vanuatu from 22 September 2014 until his death in 2017.

== Early life and career ==
Lonsdale was born on Mota Lava, in the Banks Islands, in 1948. Before becoming president, Lonsdale was a civil servant who served as the secretary general of the province of Torba on the island of Mota Lava. He later became an Anglican priest.

Lonsdale was occasionally referred to as Womtelo Reverend Baldwin Lonsdale. The title of Womtelo (“Rising Sun” in Mwotlap) is the highest rank within the customary system of chiefly grades of his native island Mota Lava.

== Education ==
Lonsdale received theological training at St John's Theological College in Auckland, New Zealand. His education prepared him for a career in Anglican ministry, during which he served in church leadership positions before pursuing public service.

== 2014 Presidential Election ==
Lonsdale was elected president in an indirect election by an electoral college consisting of members of parliament and provincial governors. The vote took eight rounds; the longest ballot in the country's history. In the last vote, Lonsdale received 46 votes of 58 possible satisfying the two-thirds majority requirement. The speaker of Vanuatu's parliament, Philip Boedoro, served as interim president during the voting.

Lonsdale was the second Anglican priest after John Bani to be elected president of Vanuatu.

== Presidency ==
In his first speech as president, Lonsdale stressed the importance of the appointment for the province of Torba, promised to uphold the constitution, and asked the people of Vanuatu to stand united.

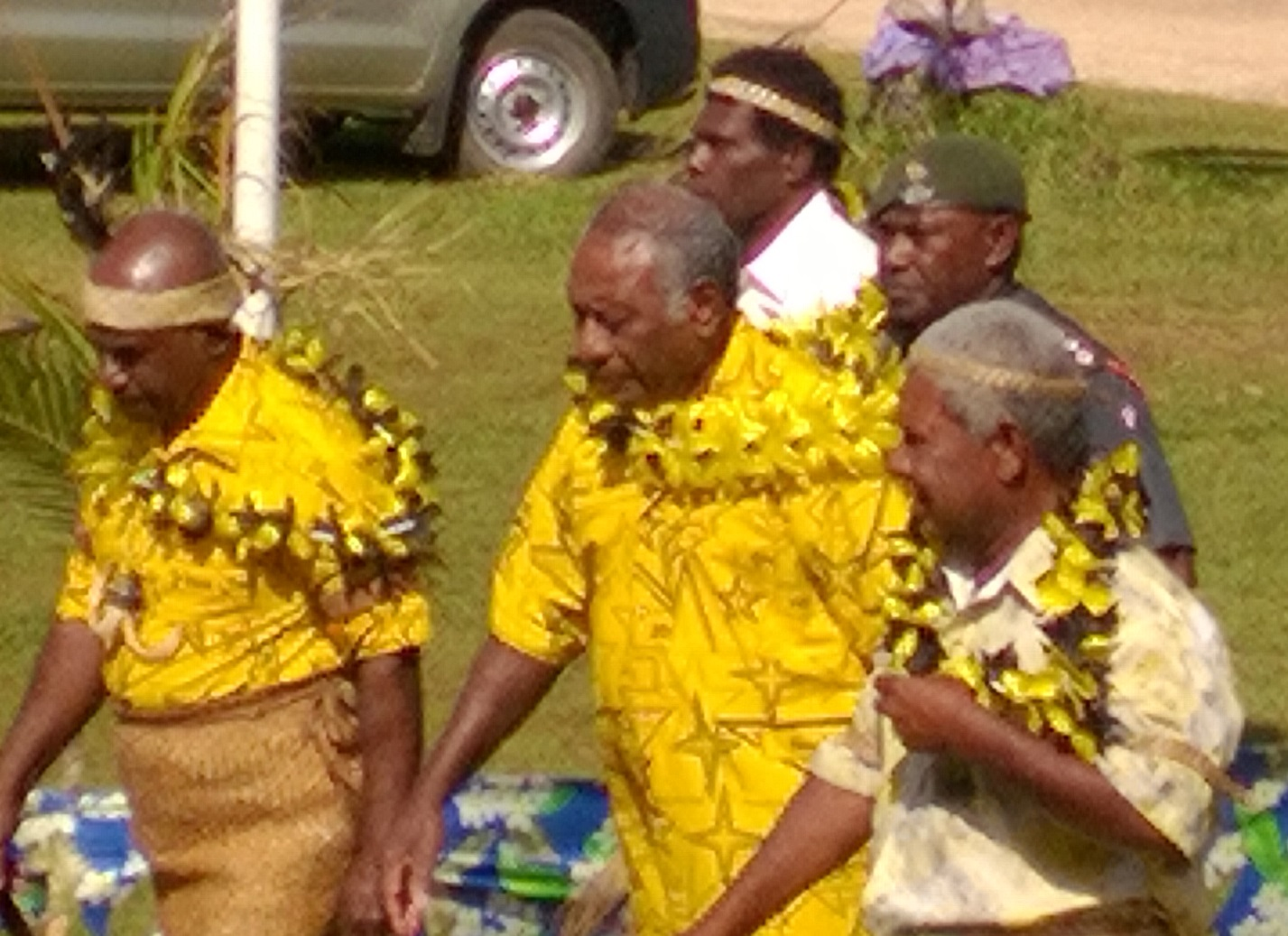
Baldwin Lonsdale (second from left) at the 2015 General Assembly of the Presbyterian Church of Vanuatu

In March 2015, Lonsdale, who was attending the World Conference on Disaster Risk Reduction in Sendai, Japan, appealed for international assistance in the aftermath of Cyclone Pam.

In October 2015, while President Lonsdale was abroad, the then Speaker of Parliament Marcellino Pipite used his position as Acting President to issue a 'presidential pardon' to himself and 13 other MPs who had just been convicted of bribery and were awaiting sentence. Returning to Vanuatu only hours after the pardon was issued, Lonsdale expressed his sorrow at what had happened and gave a widely welcomed speech declaring that nobody is above the law and that "I will clean the dirt from my backyard". After consulting with legal experts and other leaders, Lonsdale revoked the pardon, citing the articles in the Vanuatu constitution which oblige leaders to avoid conflicts of interest and avoid bringing their integrity into question. Lonsdale's decision was upheld by the Supreme Court of Vanuatu.

== Death ==
Lonsdale died on 17 June 2017 in Port Vila of a heart attack at the age of 68.

In his honour, the Arep Secondary School located on Sola, Vanuatu was renamed “Baldwin Lonsdale Memorial School” (abbreviated BLMS). Following Lonsdale's death, flags across Vanuatu were lowered to half-mast, and hundreds of mourners gathered outside the hospital in Port Vila. His body was subsequently taken to the State House, where members of the public paid their respects before funeral service were held.

Political offices
Preceded by Philip Boedoro; Acting	President of Vanuatu; 2014–2017	Succeeded by Esmon Saimon; Acting
