= 1963 New Hebridean Chamber of Commerce, Industry and Agriculture election =

Elections to the Chamber of Commerce, Industry and Agriculture were held in the New Hebrides in 1963. They were the first elections in the territory's history.

== Background ==
An Advisory Council was set up in 1958, with all members appointed. A 20-member Chamber of Commerce, Industry and Agriculture was subsequently created in 1963, with 12 members appointed by the British and French Resident Commissioners (eight from the indigenous population and four Europeans) and eight elected European members, four from the agriculture sector and four from the commerce and industry sector. The right to vote was limited to people with a trading licence, and only around 230 people – mostly Europeans – were eligible to vote.

== Results ==
Type	Member
Elected Europeans (agriculture)	Gabriel des Granges
Elected Europeans (agriculture)	J. Ratard
Elected Europeans (agriculture)	H. Russet
Elected Europeans (agriculture)	K. Solway
Elected Europeans (commerce and industry)	J. Chauveau
Elected Europeans (commerce and industry)	L. Leca
Elected Europeans (commerce and industry)	G. Meyer
Elected Europeans (commerce and industry)	J. Stegler
Appointed Europeans (agriculture)	P. Lutgen
Appointed Europeans (agriculture)	G. Seagoe
Appointed Europeans (commerce and industry)	D.J. Gubbay
Appointed Europeans (commerce and industry)	J. Villemont
Appointed indigenous	Ati
Appointed indigenous	André Carlot
Appointed indigenous	Frank
Appointed indigenous	Garae
Appointed indigenous	John Kalsakau
Appointed indigenous	Jean-Marie Léyé
Appointed indigenous	Tom Tipoloamata
Appointed indigenous	To
Source: Pacific Islands Monthly

== Aftermath ==
The Chamber met for the first time in Port Vila on 14 June, with both Resident Commissioners making speeches.

In 1964 the Advisory Council was reconstituted to include four members elected by the Chamber of Commerce, Industry and Agriculture (two British and two French) and four elected by the four district councils. Guichard, Leca (French), Seagoe and Solway (British) were elected by the Chamber, whilst John Kalsakau (Central 1), Joseph d'Uripiv (Central 2), Michael Ala (Northern) and Jean-Marie Léyé (Southern) were elected by the district councils.
