= List of speakers of the Parliament of Vanuatu =

The Speaker of the Parliament of Vanuatu is the presiding officer of the legislature of Vanuatu. The salary of the speaker is VT 291,561 fortnightly (US$60,601,017 annually)

Name	Took office	Left office	Notes
Fred Timakata	1979	1980	
Maxime Carlot Korman	July 1980	November 1983	
Fred Timakata	November 1983	November 1987	Acting President in 1984
Onneyn Tahi	December 1987	June 1991	Acting President in 1989
Tele Taun	June 1991	August 1991	
Vincent Boulekone	August 1991	December 1991	
Alfred Maseng	December 1991	November 1995	Acting President in 1994
Maxime Carlot Korman	December 1995	February 1996	
Edward Natapei	February 1996	November 1999	Acting President in 1999
Paul Ren Tari	November 1999	May 2001	
Donald Kalpokas	May 2001	May 2002	
Henry Taga	June 2002	December 2003	
Roger Abiut	December 2003	July 2004	Acting President twice in 2004
Josias Moli	July 2004	December 2004	Acting President in 2004
Sam Dan Avock	December 2004	September 2008	
George Wells	September 2008	June 2009	
Maxime Carlot Korman	June 2009	January 2010	Acting President in 2009
George Wells	January 2010	December 2010	
Maxime Carlot Korman	December 2010	September 2011	
Dunstan Hilton	September 2011	September 2012	
George Wells	November 2012	April 2013	
Philip Boedoro	April 2013	June 2015	Acting President in 2014
Marcellino Pipite	June 2015	October 2015	
Esmon Saimon	11 February 2016	6 September 2019	Acting President in 2017
Seoule Simeon	6 September 2019	20 April 2020	
Gracia Shadrack	20 April 2020	15 June 2021	
Seoule Simeon	15 June 2021	18 August 2022	
Seoule Simeon	4 November 2022	11 February 2025	Acting President in 2022
Stephen Dorrick Felix	11 February 2025	Incumbent	
