= Ni-Vanuatu name =

Ni-Vanuatu names are the names used by the people of Vanuatu, who are commonly known as ni-Vanuatu. Under the law of Vanuatu, a child's name registered at birth should include "the family name, the Christian name, if any, and the Melanesian individual name", the latter of which is also known as a "traditional name" or "custom name".

Naming customs differ between the various islands which comprise Vanuatu. The decision whether to give a child a custom name and/or "foreign name" may be tied to the parents' expectations of the child's future life path: whether he would remain in his village and inherit his ancestors' property and social roles, or whether he would leave to pursue a career elsewhere. Dickinson Tevi of the Mama Graon Project has expressed concerns that due to Western influence, the use of traditional names is dying out; he described traditional names as a vital link between children and their cultures and customs.

Traditional names may be given at birth, or bestowed in adulthood by chiefs. Chiefs may also remove a traditional name so bestowed; in 2012, the chiefs of Tanna and then-President of Vanuatu Iolu Abil came to an agreement that Abil would no longer use the traditional name "Kaniapnin". Land tribunals may look at custom names as one factor in attempting to determine who has the right of usage of disputed custom land, as custom names are also sometimes tied to toponymy. For example, in central and southern Vanuatu, men's custom names make reference to the place where their clan's founding ancestors first appeared, known in Bislama as stamba.
