= President of Vanuatu =

Head of state

- Presiden blong Vanuatu (Bislama); Président de Vanuatu (French)
- Presidential Standard

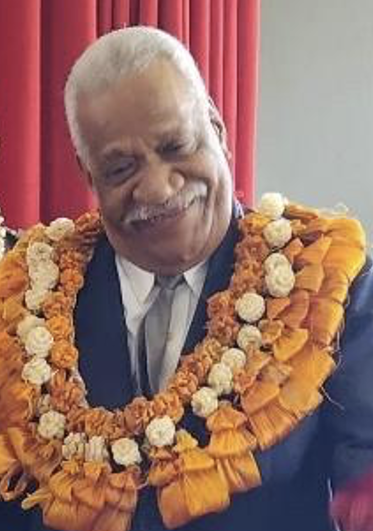
- Incumbent; Nikenike Vurobaravu since 23 July 2022
- Style: His Excellency
- Appointer: Electoral college
- Term length: Five years non-renewable
- Constituting instrument: Constitution of Vanuatu (1980)
- Precursor: Resident commissioner
- Inaugural holder: Ati George Sokomanu
- Formation: 30 July 1980; 46 years ago
- Salary: VT 67,846 weekly (US$32,295 annually)

The president of Vanuatu (French: Président du Vanuatu) is the head of state of Vanuatu. The president is elected for a five-year term by an electoral college consisting of Parliament and the presidents of the regional councils.

The president's role is mostly ceremonial. The Constitution grants the president the ability to appoint the chief justice of the Supreme Court of Vanuatu, and three other justices.

In case of vacancy, the speaker of the Parliament will be the acting president of Vanuatu.

From 1906 to 1980 the resident commissioners of the New Hebrides were British and French colonial officials. From 1887 to 1906 the New Hebrides was led by Anglo-French joint naval commissioners.

The current president is Nikenike Vurobaravu, since 23 July 2022.

== List of presidents ==
No.	Portrait	Name (Birth–Death)	Term of office			Political party
No.	Portrait	Name (Birth–Death)	Took office	Left office	Time in office	Political party
1	Ati George Sokomanu	Ati George Sokomanu (born 1936)	30 July 1980	17 February 1984	3 years, 202 days	Vanua'aku Pati
–	Fred Timakata	Fred Timakata (1936–1995); Acting	17 February 1984	8 March 1984	20 days	Vanua'aku Pati
(1)	Ati George Sokomanu	Ati George Sokomanu (born 1936)	8 March 1984	12 January 1989	4 years, 310 days	Vanua'aku Pati
–	Onneyn Tahi	Onneyn Tahi (1944–1998); Acting	12 January 1989	30 January 1989	18 days	Vanua'aku Pati
2	Fred Timakata	Fred Timakata (1936–1995)	30 January 1989	30 January 1994	5 years	Vanua'aku Pati
–	Alfred Maseng	Alfred Maseng (?–2004); Acting	30 January 1994	2 March 1994	31 days	UMP
3	Jean-Marie Léyé	Jean-Marie Léyé (1932–2014)	2 March 1994	2 March 1999	5 years	UMP
–	Edward Natapei	Edward Natapei (1954–2015); Acting	2 March 1999	24 March 1999	22 days	Vanua'aku Pati
4	John Bani	John Bani (born 1941)	24 March 1999	24 March 2004	5 years	UMP
–	Roger Abiut	Roger Abiut (born 1972); Acting	24 March 2004	12 April 2004	19 days	Labour
5	Alfred Maseng	Alfred Maseng (?–2004); De facto	12 April 2004	11 May 2004 (Election invalidated)	90 days	UMP
–	Roger Abiut	Roger Abiut (born 1972); Acting	11 May 2004	28 July 2004	17 days	Labour
–	Josias Moli	Josias Moli (born 1954); Acting	28 July 2004	16 August 2004	19 days	UMP
6	Kalkot Mataskelekele	Kalkot Mataskelekele (born 1949)	16 August 2004	16 August 2009	5 years	National United
–	Maxime Carlot Korman	Maxime Carlot Korman (born 1941); Acting	16 August 2009	2 September 2009	17 days	UMP
7	Iolu Abil	Iolu Abil (born 1942)	2 September 2009	2 September 2014	5 years	Vanua'aku Pati
–	Philip Boedoro	Philip Boedoro (born 1958); Acting	2 September 2014	22 September 2014	20 days	Vanua'aku Pati
8	Baldwin Lonsdale	Baldwin Lonsdale (1948–2017)	22 September 2014	17 June 2017 †	2 years, 268 days	Independent
–	Esmon Saimon	Esmon Saimon (born 1955); Acting	17 June 2017	6 July 2017	19 days	Melanesian Progressive
9	Tallis Obed Moses	Tallis Obed Moses (born 1954)	6 July 2017	6 July 2022	5 years	Independent
–	Seule Simeon	Seule Simeon (born 1970); Acting	6 July 2022	23 July 2022	17 days	Independent
10	Nikenike Vurobaravu	Nikenike Vurobaravu (born 1951)	23 July 2022	Incumbent	4 years, 46 days	Vanua'aku Pati

== See also ==
- Politics of Vanuatu
- Prime Minister of Vanuatu
- List of resident commissioners of the New Hebrides
