= Ati George Sokomanu =

President of Vanuatu, 1980–1984 and 1984–1989

His Excellency Ati George Sokomanu MBE
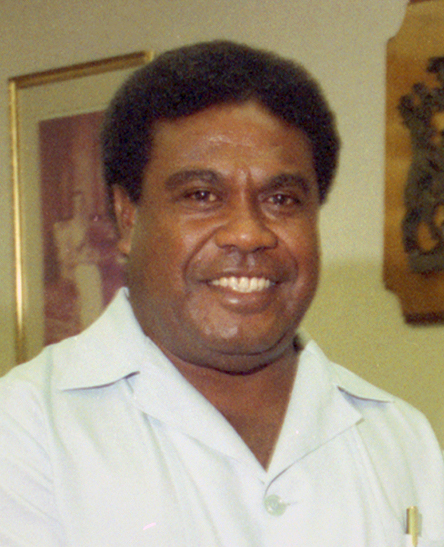
- Sokomanu in 1985

1st President of Vanuatu
- In office 8 March 1984 – 12 January 1989
- Prime Minister: Walter Lini
- Preceded by: Frederick Karlomuana Timakata (acting)
- Succeeded by: Onneyn Tahi (acting)
- In office 30 July 1980 – 17 February 1984
- Prime Minister: Walter Lini
- Preceded by: Position established
- Succeeded by: Frederick Karlomuana Timakata (acting)

Personal details
- Born: George Kalkoa; 13 January 1936 (age 90) Mele, New Hebrides (now Vanuatu)
- Party: Vanua'aku Pati
- Spouse: Leitak Sokomanu
- Children: 3

Ati George Sokomanu, MBE (born George Kalkoa; 13 January 1936) is a Vanuatuan politician who served as the first president of Vanuatu from 1980 to 1984 and again from 1984 to 1989.

== Early life ==
Born in 1936 in Mele, Sokomanu was educated at Iririki District School in Port Vila and the Lelean Memorial School in Fiji in the 1940s. An Anglophone, he joined the New Hebrides British National Service as a clerical officer in 1957 and spent almost 20 years in the District Administration. After graduating in 1965 with a Diploma in Public and Social Administration, he was promoted to assistant administrative officer. He was elected as a member of the New Hebrides Advisory Council in 1969. In 1974, he undertook an administrative course at the University of the South Pacific. From 1978 to 1979, he was the Minister of Public Administration in the Government of National Unity. Elected to the parliament in 1979, he served as Minister of Home Affairs and deputy chief minister in Walter Lini's government.

== Presidency ==
He was elected President (a ceremonial office) by the Parliament when Vanuatu gained independence in 1980. Sokomanu was a member of the Vanua'aku Pati during his presidency. He resigned in February 1984 while he was being prosecuted for a tax violation, but was reelected and restored to the presidency weeks later by the Parliament for a five-year term. In December 1988, he attempted to dismiss the Prime Minister, Walter Lini, and install a new government headed by his own nephew, Barak Sopé; the Supreme Court of Vanuatu overturned the President's decision the next day. The Electoral College removed Sokomanu from office for gross misconduct in 1989. Sokomanu was sentenced to a lengthy term in jail, but the Vanuatu Court of Appeals overturned the sentence.

== Later life ==
He served as Secretary-General of the Pacific Community from 1993 to 1996. He was a batonbearer for the 2022 Commonwealth Games Queen's Baton Relay when the baton came to his archipelago in February 2022.

He has been awarded the Vanuatu Order of Merit and an MBE.

== Personal life ==
He was married to Leitak Sokomanu. She died on 14 November 2020 at the age of 82.
