= List of resident commissioners of the New Hebrides =

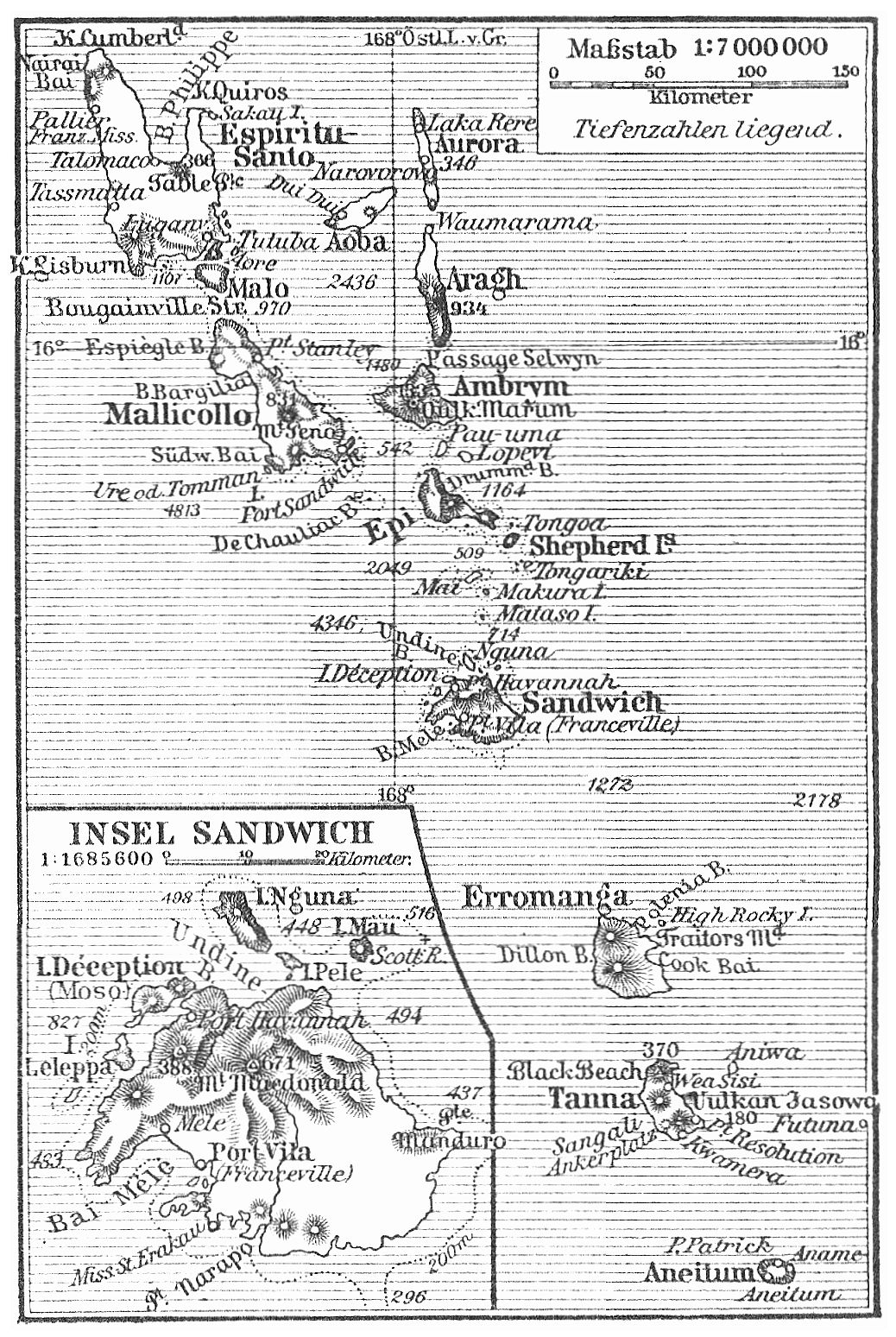
A 1905 map of the New Hebrides, in German

This is a list of the resident commissioners of the New Hebrides, an Anglo-French condominium encompassing the territory of the present-day Republic of Vanuatu, that was divided into two separate communities: one Anglophone and one Francophone.

== List of officeholders ==
Tenure	Incumbent	Notes
British Administration of New Hebrides
Subordinated to the High Commissioner for the Western Pacific (at Fiji to 1952, then at the Solomon Islands)
1887 to 1902	British Naval Commission	
1902 to 1907	Ernest Goldfinch Rason, Resident Commissioner	
December 1907 to 1924	Merton King, Resident Commissioner	
1924 to 17 August 1927	Geoffrey Bingham Whistler Smith-Rewse, Resident Commissioner	
1927 to 1940	George Joy, Resident Commissioner	
1940 to 1950	Richard Denis Blandy, Resident Commissioner	
1950 to 1955	Hubert James Marlowe Flaxman, Resident Commissioner	From 10 June 1954, Sir Hubert James Marlowe Flaxman
1955 to 1962	John Shaw Rennie, Resident Commissioner	
1962 to 1966	Alexander Mair Wilkie, Resident Commissioner	
1966 to 1973	Colin Hamilton Allan, Resident Commissioner	
1973 to 1975	Roger William Houssemayne du Boulay, Resident Commissioner	
1975 to October 1978	John Stuart Champion, Resident Commissioner	
November 1978 to 1980	Andrew Christopher Stuart, Resident Commissioner	
30 July 1980	Independence as Republic of Vanuatu	

Tenure	Incumbent	Notes
French Administration of New Hebrides
Subordinated to the High Commissioners in the Pacific Ocean (from 22 March 1907 the Governors of New Caledonia)
1887 to 1901	French Naval Commission	
1901 to 1904	Gaudence Charles Faraut, Resident Commissioner	
1904 to January 1908	Charles Bord, Resident Commissioner	
1908 to 1909	Charles Henri Adrien Noufflard, Resident Commissioner	
1909 to 1911	Jules Martin, Resident Commissioner	
1911 to 1913	Jules Vincent Repiquet, Resident Commissioner	
1913 to 1916	Jacques Louis Miramende, Resident Commissioner	1st time
1916 to 1918	Edmond Lippmann, Resident Commissioner	
1918 to 1919	Lucien Huques Arthur Nielly, Resident Commissioner	
1919 to 1920	Alfred Solari, Resident Commissioner	
1920 to 1921	Jacques Louis Miramende, Resident Commissioner	2nd time
1921 to 1923	Henri Joseph Marie d'Arboussier, Resident Commissioner	1st time
1923 to 1925	Auguste Adolphe Joseph Marie Raoul de la Vaissière, Resident Commissioner	
1925 to 1929	Henri Joseph Marie d'Arboussier, Resident Commissioner	2nd time
1929 to 1930	Gabriel Henri Joseph Thaly, Resident Commissioner	
1930 to 1931	Maurice Georges Tronet, Resident Commissioner	
1931 to 1933	Antoine Louis Carlotti, Resident Commissioner	
1933 to 1935	Henri Sautot, Resident Commissioner	1st time
1935 to 1937	Fernand Gaston Georges Émile Robert Casimir, Resident Commissioner	
1937 to 1940	Henri Sautot, Resident Commissioner	2nd time
1940 to 1947	Robert Charles Henri Kuter, Resident Commissioner	
1947 to 1949	André Ménard, Resident Commissioner	
1949 to 1958	Pierre Amédée Joseph Émile Jean Anthonioz, Resident Commissioner	
1958 to 1960	Benjamin Marcel Favreau, Resident Commissioner	
1960 to 1965	Maurice Charles Jules Delauney, Resident Commissioner	
1965 to 1969	Jacques Mouradian, Resident Commissioner	
1969 to 1974	Robert Jules Amédée Langlois, Resident Commissioner	
1974 to 1978	Robert Gauger, Resident Commissioner	
1978	Bernard Pottier, Resident Commissioner	
1978 to 1980	Jean-Jacques Robert, Resident Commissioner	
30 July 1980	Independence as Republic of Vanuatu	

For continuation after independence, see: President of Vanuatu

== See also ==
- History of Vanuatu
- Politics of Vanuatu
- President of Vanuatu
- Prime Minister of Vanuatu
