= Stephen Dorrick Felix =

Vanuatuan politician

Stephen Dorrick Felix is a Vanuatuan politician from Leaders Party of Vanuatu who and currently serving as speaker of 14th Parliament of Vanuatu and also served as Acting President. He also served as Judge of Supreme Court of Vanuatu since April 2018.

== Personal life ==
He was born on September 16, 1973, and married to Rose-Hanna.
