= Fred Timakata =

President of Vanuatu from 1989 to 1994

His Excellency Reverend Fred Timakata

2nd President of Vanuatu
- In office 30 January 1989 – 30 January 1994
- Prime Minister: Donald Kalpokas; Maxime Carlot Korman
- Preceded by: Onneyn Tahi (acting)
- Succeeded by: Alfred Maseng (acting)
- In office 17 February 1984 – 8 March 1984 (acting)
- Prime Minister: Maxime Carlot Korman
- Preceded by: Ati George Sokomanu
- Succeeded by: Ati George Sokomanu

Personal details
- Born: Frederick Karlomuana Timakata; 1936 Emae, New Hebrides
- Died: 21 March 1995 (aged 58–59)
- Party: Vanua'aku Pati

Frederick "Fred" Karlomuana Timakata (1936 – 21 March 1995) was a Ni-Vanuatu politician who served as the president of Vanuatu from 1989 to 1994.

Timakata was born at Makatea Village on the island of Emae, in the Shepherd Group. He attended school on Emae and later at the district school on Epi Island. He undertook teacher training at the Teachers' Training Institute on Santo, and taught there for a number of years. Later, he did pastoral training at the Methodist Theological College and the Pacific Theological College in Fiji. After serving as a parish pastor for several years, he became Assistant Assembly Clerk and later Assembly Clerk for the Presbyterian Church of New Hebrides.

Timakata assisted in the founding of the New Hebrides National Party, and in 1973 became its vice president. He was elected as a member of the pre-independence Representative Assembly in 1979, and became its chair. He resigned that position before independence and was appointed Deputy Prime Minister and Minister of Home Affairs upon independence in 1980.

Timakata was Speaker of the Parliament from November 1983 to November 1987, and served as acting President of Vanuatu briefly in 1984. He was subsequently elected as President for a five-year term from 30 January 1989 to 30 January 1994.

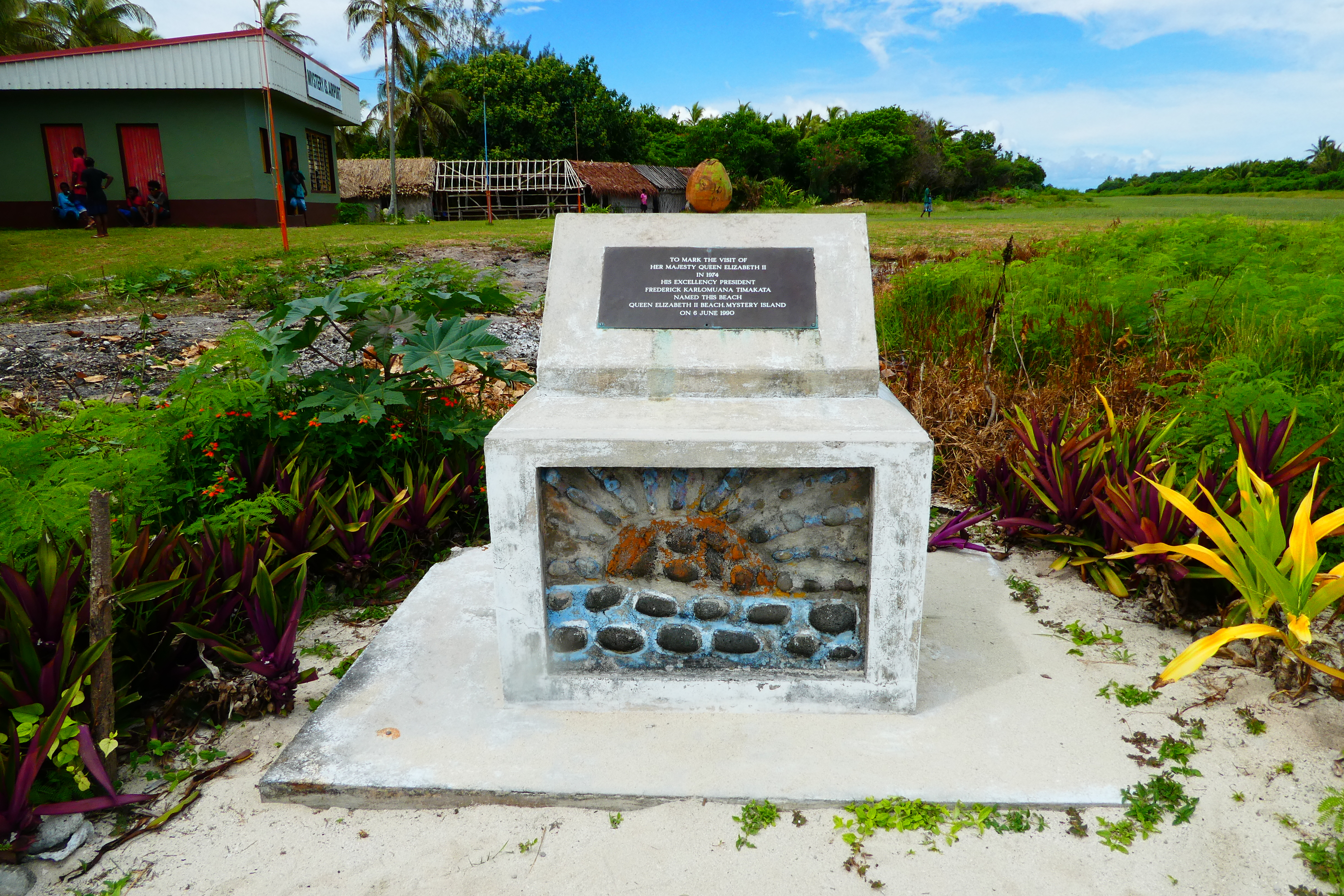
A monument commemorating Timakata's naming of a beach on Mystery Island.
