= Natamata =

Concept from the culture of Vanuatu

Natamata (a Bislama name derived from vernacular words such as Raga / East Ambae tamata and Apma temwat) is a concept underlying the social fabric of traditional communities in north-eastern Vanuatu. The concept has no exact equivalent in Western culture and law. It is sometimes translated as "peace", though "harmony" is probably a closer translation. The concept encompasses social and spiritual harmony, and the set of unwritten customary laws by which this harmony is maintained.

Maintaining natamata is the responsibility of customary chiefs. It is believed that when a transgression is committed by a member of the community, natamata is broken, and must be restored, usually by the paying of fines to the chief and to the person who was wronged.

References to natamata are common in personal names and place names, such as the Penama Provincial Centre of Saratamata on Ambae, whose name translates roughly as "Field of Harmony".
