= Vincent Lunabek =

Vanuatuan legal and political figure

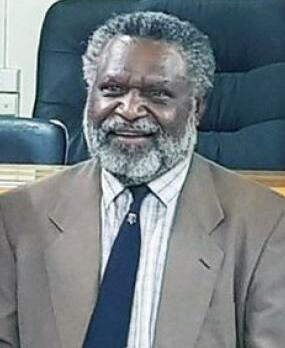
Lunabek in 2019

Vincent Lunabek is a Vanuatuan legal and political figure.

Lunabek was appointed a Supreme Court of Vanuatu justice in 1996. Since 2001, he has served as the Chief Justice of the Supreme Court.
