= Maxime Carlot Korman =

Prime Minister of Vanuatu, 1991–1995 and in 1996

Acting President of Vanuatu
- In office 16 August 2009 – 2 September 2009
- Prime Minister: Edward Natapei
- Preceded by: Kalkot Mataskelekele
- Succeeded by: Iolu Abil

Prime Minister of Vanuatu
- In office 23 February 1996 – 30 September 1996
- President: Jean Marie Leye Lenelgau
- Preceded by: Serge Vohor
- Succeeded by: Serge Vohor
- In office 16 December 1991 – 21 December 1995
- President: Frederick Karlomuana Timakata; Alfred Maseng (Acting); Jean Marie Leye Lenelgau
- Preceded by: Donald Kalpokas
- Succeeded by: Serge Vohor

Speaker of the Parliament
- In office July 1980 – November 1983
- Preceded by: New Office
- Succeeded by: Fred Timakata
- In office December 1995 – February 1996
- Preceded by: Alfred Maseng
- Succeeded by: Edward Natapei
- In office June 2009 – January 2010
- Preceded by: George Wells
- Succeeded by: George Wells
- In office December 2010 – September 2011
- Preceded by: George Wells
- Succeeded by: Dunstan Hilton

Personal details
- Born: 26 April 1941 (age 84) Erakor, Efate, New Hebrides
- Party: Republican Party (1998–present)
- Other political affiliations: Union of Moderate Parties (Before 1998)

Maxime Carlot Korman (born 26 April 1941) is a Vanuatuan politician, formerly serving as the speaker of the Parliament and formerly as acting president. He served as the prime minister of Vanuatu for nearly five years, first from 16 December 1991 to 21 December 1995 and again from 23 February 1996 to 30 September 1996. He was a member of the Union of Moderate Parties during his terms as prime minister, but now leads the Vanuatu Republican Party. He was the first Speaker of Parliament after independence, from July 1980 to November 1983, and also served in that capacity just before independence.

== Political career ==
Korman became prime minister following the Union of Moderate Parties's victory in the 1991 election, which came after the split in the ruling Vanua'aku Party. He was the first francophone Prime Minister of Vanuatu, following the anglophone Walter Lini's government throughout the 1980s.

Korman's foreign policy marked a distinct break with Lini's. He "reversed [the country's] unequivocal support for the Kanak National Liberation Front in New Caledonia, its systematic enmity towards France, its flirting with radical regimes, and its openly anti-American nuclear-free Pacific stance."

Following the 1995 election Korman was replaced as prime minister by Serge Vohor, a dissident leader of his own party. Two months later Korman was able to accumulate enough support to oust Vohor and regain control of the party and the premiership, but after seven months he was again deposed in a 27-22 no confidence vote and replaced by Vohor. Korman was never again able to regain leadership of the Union of Moderate Parties. He had also served as Minister of Foreign Affairs from 1993 to 1995. Following his terms as prime minister, Korman broke away from the Union of Moderate Parties to form the Vanuatu Republican Party, which he still leads. Following the July 2004 election, Korman became deputy prime minister under Vohor, but was replaced a month later when a national coalition took office.

He was Minister of Infrastructure and Public Utilities for a time, but was removed from this post and replaced by Edward Natapei in July 2005.

Korman and the Republican Party remained in the governing coalition, and Maxime Carlot Korman eventually became Minister of Lands. In July 2007, Maxime Carlot Korman and his son were faced with corruption allegations involving land deals, which Korman strongly denied.

Following the September 2008 general election, Korman was a candidate for the post of prime minister in the parliamentary vote held on 22 September, but was defeated by Natapei, receiving 25 votes against 27 for Natapei.

However, he was elected to be the Speaker of Parliament. On 18 August 2009, when the term of the President of Vanuatu expired, Korman became acting president in his capacity as Speaker of Parliament until the election of a successor on 2 September 2009.

George Wells replaced him as Speaker in January 2010, before resigning in December, whereupon Korman was elected anew to the position.

In September 2011, after he had "rigidly applied standing orders to stop the [ Kilman ] government bringing in a supplementary budget", he was removed as Speaker by the government's parliamentary majority. Ironically, as "Senior Member of Parliament" (Father of the House), he was then called upon to preside over the election of a new Speaker, which he reportedly "readily agreed" to. The government's candidate, Dunstan Hilton, was elected unopposed. A few days later, the government introduced a motion to suspend Korman from Parliament altogether for the remainder of its term, which Radio New Zealand International described as the government's way of "punish[ing him] for his controversial rulings". The motion was passed by twenty-six votes out of fifty-two. Korman announced he would appeal to the courts.

== Personal life ==
Korman was born in Erakor, a village near Port Vila (not to be confused with the island of the same name), and is of mixed European and Melanesian descent. On his father's side, he is descended from a chief of Erakor who married a Samoan woman. He attended both Francophone and Anglophone schools in his youth. His wife is from Mele. He worked with linguist Jean-Claude Rivierre to produce a wordlist of the South Efate language in the 1960s. He added the traditional name "Korman" to his name Maxime Carlot when he became prime minister.

Political offices
Preceded by Donald Kalpokas	Prime Minister of Vanuatu; 1991–1995	Succeeded by Serge Vohor
Preceded by Serge Vohor	Prime Minister of Vanuatu; 1996	Succeeded by Serge Vohor
Preceded by Kalkot Mataskelekele	President of Vanuatu; Acting; 2009	Succeeded by Iolu Abil
