= Constitution of Vanuatu =

National constitution

The Constitution of Vanuatu is the supreme law of the Republic of Vanuatu. It was enacted in 1979, and came into force upon the country's independence on 30 July 1980.

The Constitution asserts Vanuatu to be a "sovereign democratic state", with sovereignty vested in "the people of Vanuatu which they exercise through their elected representatives". The Constitution enumerates certain "fundamental rights and freedoms of the individual", establishes a basic citizenship law, and establishes and regulates the country's major political, judicial, and cultural institutions. Amongst the latter are the President; unicameral Parliament; an advisory National Council of Chiefs; the Prime Minister directly elected by Parliament; the Supreme Court; and the Court of Appeal. Bislama, English, and French are declared to be the country's "official languages", with English and French as the "principal languages of education".

The electoral franchise is guaranteed as "universal, equal and secret", and in principle is extended to all adults aged 18 years or older. Members of the National Council of Chiefs are to be "elected by their peers". An unusual feature of the Constitution is that the President is elected by an electoral college, made up of members of Parliament and the chairpersons of the local government councils.

Executive government is expressly placed in the hands of the Prime Minister and the Council of Ministers. The duties of the President are mostly ceremonial; for example, the appointment and dismissal of ministers is the formal responsibility of the Prime Minister alone.

The Constitution also makes provision for the ownership of land, including a prohibition on anyone other than "indigenous citizens" owning land.

Constitutional amendments are by parliamentary legislation, passed by at least two-thirds of all members of Parliament at a sitting at which at least three-quarters of members are present. Certain amendments must also be approved at a referendum before they can become law.

The preamble of the Constitution refers to a commitment to "traditional Melanesian values, faith in God, and Christian principles".

== See also ==
- Politics of Vanuatu
- Law of Vanuatu
- Constitutional references to God
