= Iolu Abil =

President of Vanuatu from 2009 to 2014

His Excellency Iolu Abil
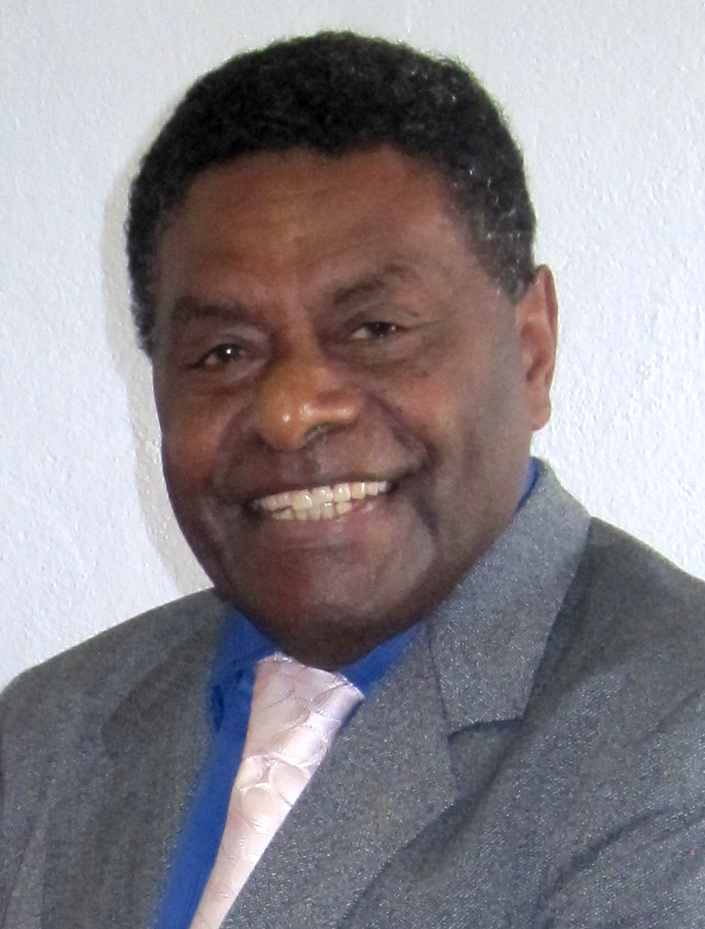
- Abil in 2010

7th President of Vanuatu
- In office 2 September 2009 – 2 September 2014
- Prime Minister: Edward Natapei; Sato Kilman; Serge Vohor; Sato Kilman; Edward Natapei (acting); Sato Kilman; Moana Carcasses Kalosil; Joe Natuman
- Preceded by: Kalkot Mataskelekele; Maxime Carlot Korman (acting)
- Succeeded by: Philip Boedoro (acting); Baldwin Lonsdale

Personal details
- Born: 17 February 1942 (age 84) Lauaneai, New Hebrides (now Vanuatu)
- Party: Vanua'aku Pati
- Education: University of the South Pacific

Iolu Johnson Abil (born 17 February 1942) is a Vanuatuan politician. He was elected and sworn in as the president of Vanuatu on 2 September 2009.

== Biography ==
=== Personal life ===
Abbil is from Tanna island, which is located in Vanuatu's southernmost Tafea Province. He was born in the village of Louaneai on Tanna in the New Hebrides in 1942 to parents George Yaviniau and Nassuaiu. His father originally owned his own store, but closed the business after Iolu later suggested the family join a business cooperative.

Abbil holds the chiefly title of Yaniniko, which means chief's spokesman on the island of Tanna. His hereditary title was granted to him by his grandfather, Joe Yautim, who was a Yaramara, or chief, on Tanna. Abil's father, George Yaviniau, was also a chief, but had not been granted the right to be a chiefly spokesperson as of the early 1980s.

Abbil attended the local Lenakel village elementary school on his home island of Tanna. He next enrolled at Lenakel Senior Primary School, which he attended from 1956 until 1958. He graduated from Onesua High School.

He is an elder in the Presbyterian Church in Vanuatu.

=== Career ===
Abbil joined the British National Service as a cooperative inspector in 1964. He also took a job with the New Hebrides Cooperative Department in 1964, a position he held for the next sixteen years. He enrolled in cooperative development training courses in Papua New Guinea and Fiji during the 1960s. He then became a student at the Loughborough International Co-operative College in the United Kingdom for two years.

Abbil completed three months of administration and management courses at the University of the South Pacific in Suva, Fiji, in 1973.

He served in the Cabinet member in the first post-independence government of Prime Minister Walter Lini, thereby becoming Vanuatu's first Secretary of the Ministry of Lands.

Mr. Iolu Abbil moved to politics in the late 1990s to later become the Member of Parliament for Tanna. In that capacity he also became the State Minister for Internal Affairs for a complete term before retiring from politics in the 2003.

Iolu Abbil was appointed as the interim Ombudsman of Vanuatu in November 2004, following the departure of Hannington Alatoa, whose term in office had expired in June 2004. Abil served as interim Ombudsman until April 2005 when Peter Taurakoto was appointed to a five-year term by President Kalkot Mataskelekele.

Abbil has also held a number of positions within the private sector, including as chairman of Air Vanuatu.

== President of Vanuatu ==
Abil was elected president by Vanuatu's 58-member electoral college on 2 September 2009. Abil was elected on the electoral college's third round of voting in two days. No candidate had garnered the required two-thirds of the vote in electoral college in previous two rounds of voting.

Several members of parliament within Prime Minister Edward Natapei's governing coalition had supported former President Kalkot Mataskelekele in the first two rounds of the election. Mataskelekele's five-year term as president had ended on 16 August 2009, and he had been renominated for a second term. However, all members of Natapei coalition had unanimously agreed to support Abil in the third round on 2 September 2009.

Abil defeated six other candidates who had been nominated for president in the electoral college's third round. With the support of Prime Minister Natapei, he secured 41 votes within the 58-member electoral college, which won the presidency of Vanuatu. He was sworn in as President of Vanuatu on the evening of 2 September 2009.

Political offices
Preceded by Maxime Carlot Korman; Acting	President of Vanuatu; 2009–2014	Succeeded by Philip Boedoro; Acting
