= Roger Abiut =

Vanuatuan politician

Roger Tom Abiut (born 1972) is a Vanuatuan politician. He served as speaker of Parliament of that country and, in that capacity, served as acting president twice in 2004.

== Biography ==
Abiut is a member of the Vanuatu Labour Party. After becoming the Speaker of Parliament in December 2003, he became acting president on March 24, 2004, when the five-year term of President John Bani expired. He served in that position until April 12, when a new president, Alfred Maseng was elected by the parliament and the presidents of the regional councils. Maseng was removed as president on May 11, 2004, and Abiut became acting president again. Abiut lost his seat in Parliament shortly thereafter, in the parliamentary elections of July 7, 2004, and therefore lost his positions as speaker of parliament and acting President on July 28, 2004, at the first session of Parliament. The Vanuatu Labor Party no longer has any representatives in Parliament.
