= Donald Kalpokas =

Former Prime Minister of Vanuatu

His Excellency Donald Kalpokas
- Kalpokas in 2003

2nd Prime Minister of Vanuatu
- In office 30 March 1998 – 25 November 1999
- President: Jean-Marie Léyé; Edward Natapei (Acting); John Bani
- Preceded by: Serge Vohor
- Succeeded by: Barak Sopé
- In office 6 September 1991 – 16 December 1991
- President: Frederick Karlomuana Timakata
- Preceded by: Walter Lini
- Succeeded by: Maxime Carlot Korman

Personal details
- Born: Donald Masike'Vanua Kalpokas; 23 August 1943 Lelepa Island, New Hebrides
- Died: 20 March 2019 (aged 75) Lelepa Island, Vanuatu
- Party: Vanua'aku Pati
- Spouse: Charity Kalpokas

Donald Masike'Vanua Kalpokas (23 August 1943 – 20 March 2019) was a Ni-Vanuatu politician and diplomat who served as Prime Minister of Vanuatu in 1991, and from 1998 to 1999. He was a leader of Vanua'aku Pati and a member of the Parliament of Vanuatu.

== Career ==
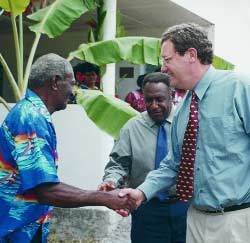
From left to right: Chief Peter Poilapa of Imere, Kalpokas, and Alexander Downer

Vanua'aku Pati (VP) was co-founded by Walter Lini and Kalpokas. He served as president of VP and was its honorary vice president until his death. Kalpokas was Minister of Foreign Affairs in Lini's government. Kalpokas was a member of the 1st to 7th sessions of the Parliament of Vanuatu and was its speaker.

Kalpokas lost his seat in parliament in the 2004 election. In November 2007, Kalpokas was appointed as Vanuatu's Permanent Representative to the United Nations. In May 2011, Abkhazia claimed that Vanuatu recognised its independence, but Kalpokas denied this.

=== Prime Minister ===
Lini dismissed Kalpokas from his cabinet in June 1991. Kalpokas defeated Lini for the presidency of VP in August. Lini broke away and formed the National United Party (NUP). Kalpokas and VP had 19 MPs while Lini and the NUP had 21 MPs. Kalpokas formed a government with the Tan Union and replaced Lini as Prime Minister of Vanuatu. VP lost its majority in the 1991 election and a new government was formed by Maxime Carlot Korman. VP suffered in the election due to losing support to the NUP.

No party gained a majority of the seats after the 1998 election. VP and NUP formed a coalition government that made Kalpokas prime minister and Lini deputy prime minister. However, the coalition broke apart in October after the NUP was accused of breaking the coalition agreement. VP formed a coalition with the Union of Moderate Parties and John Frum. By August 1999, four by-elections reduced the power of the coalition government. Kalpokas resigned on 25 November in order to avoid a motion of no confidence. He was replaced by Barak Sopé.

== Personal life ==
Kalpokas was a Presbyterian. He died on 20 March 2019.

== Works cited ==
=== Books ===
- Rich, Roland, ed. (2008). Political Parties in the Pacific Islands. ANU Press. ISBN 9781921313769.

=== Journals ===
- Brooks, Courtney (2013). "Making a State a State". World Policy Journal. 30 (1). Duke University Press: 24–32. doi:10.2307/43290393. JSTOR 43290393.
- Steeves, Jeffrey (1992). "Vanuatu: The 1991 National Elections and Their Aftermath". The Journal of Pacific History. 27 (2). Taylor & Francis: 93–101. doi:10.2307/25169129. JSTOR 25169129.
- Tarte, Sandra; Chappell, David; Jowitt, Anita (2000). "Melanesia in Review: Issues and Events, 1999". The Contemporary Pacific. 12 (2). University of Hawaiʻi Press: 507–524. doi:10.2307/23717354. JSTOR 23717354.

=== News ===
- Ligo, Godwin (21 March 2019). "State Funeral for Former PM Donald Kalpokas". Vanuatu Daily Post. Archived from the original on 23 March 2019.}

=== Web ===
- "Hon. Donald Kalpokas". Parliament of Vanuatu. Archived from the original on 22 November 2026.
- "List of Permanent Representatives and Observers to the United Nations in New York" (PDF). United Nations. 20 June 2008. Archived from the original (PDF) on 24 June 2008.
- "Vanuatu". United States Department of State. Archived from the original on 22 November 2026.
