= Kalkot Mataskelekele =

President of Vanuatu from 2004 to 2009

His Excellency Kalkot Mataskelekele
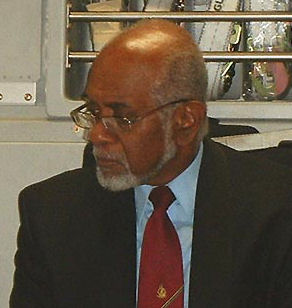
- Kalkot Mataskelekele in 2009

6th President of Vanuatu
- In office 16 August 2004 – 16 August 2009
- Prime Minister: Edward Natapei; Serge Vohor; Ham Lini; Edward Natapei
- Preceded by: Alfred Maseng; Josias Moli (acting)
- Succeeded by: Maxime Carlot Korman (acting); Iolu Abil

Member of the Vanuatu Parliament for Port Vila
- In office 1988–1991

Personal details
- Born: 24 April 1949 (age 76)
- Party: National United Party
- Spouse(s): Hanson Mataskelekele; Heather Lini-Leo Matas (m. 2014-2016; her death)

Kalkot Mataskelekele Mauliliu (born 24 April 1949) is a ni-Vanuatu politician who served as the president of Vanuatu from 16 August 2004 to 16 August 2009.

== Biography ==
He was educated at Scotch College, Melbourne the University of Papua New Guinea. He is a lawyer from the national capital, Port Vila, and is the first Head of State of Vanuatu to have a university degree. Mataskelekele had previously served as Vanuatu's first indigenous Solicitor General and a former Supreme Court justice.

He was elected by the electoral college, which consists of the Parliament and regional Presidents, on 16 August 2004, and sworn in the same day.

He had previously been a candidate in the presidential election of April 2004, and was backed by the government of Edward Natapei. However, after several inconclusive rounds in the electoral college, he was defeated by Alfred Maseng. After the impeachment of Maseng and a parliamentary election, a new election was held on 12 August 2004, which was inconclusive and was continued on 16 August. Though Kalkot was widely expected to win, there were many other candidates, and he faced tough opposition from Willie David Saul and former Prime Minister Donald Kalpokas. In the final round of voting, Kalkot defeated Saul by a vote of 49 to 7.

Political offices
Preceded by Josias Moli; Acting	President of Vanuatu; 2004–2009	Succeeded by Maxime Carlot Korman; Acting
