= Alfred Maseng =

Vanuatuan politician

5th President of Vanuatu
- In office 12 April 2004 – 11 May 2004
- Preceded by: Roger Abiut (acting)
- Succeeded by: Roger Abiut (acting)
- Acting
- In office 30 January 1994 – 2 March 1994
- Preceded by: Fred Timakata
- Succeeded by: Jean-Marie Léyé

Alfred Maseng Nalo (10 January 1949 – 18 November 2004) was a Vanuatuan politician. He served as speaker of the Parliament from December 1991 to November 1995, and foreign minister from 1995 until 1996. He was also the president of Vanuatu for two brief periods lasting about a month each, during 1994 and 2004.

== Biography ==
Maseng had been acting president of Vanuatu from 30 January to 2 March 1994, while he was speaker of parliament and an acting president was needed in the interval between the expiry of a president's term and the next presidential election. In the 2004 presidential elections, Maseng was one of 32 candidates, and a two-thirds majority in parliament was needed to win. Balloting started on 8 April, but this session and another session on 10 April failed to result in the required majority for any candidate. In the fourth round of balloting on 12 April (Easter Monday), Maseng defeated the government's candidate, Kalkot Mataskelekele, by a vote of 41 to 16, and was sworn in immediately. He was removed as president on 11 May 2004, by the Supreme Court, which ruled that the election was invalid because of a rule banning people with criminal records from being elected. It had been revealed that he was serving a suspended sentence on corruption charges, including receiving stolen goods.

He was a member of the conservative Francophone Union of Moderate Parties. He died at a hospital in northern Vanuatu several months after his removal from the presidency. His age and cause of death have not been reported.
