= John Bani =

President of Vanuatu from 1999 to 2004

His Excellency John Bani

4th President of Vanuatu
- In office 25 March 1999 – 24 March 2004
- Preceded by: Edward Natapei (acting)
- Succeeded by: Roger Abiut (acting)

Personal details
- Born: 1 July 1941 (age 85)

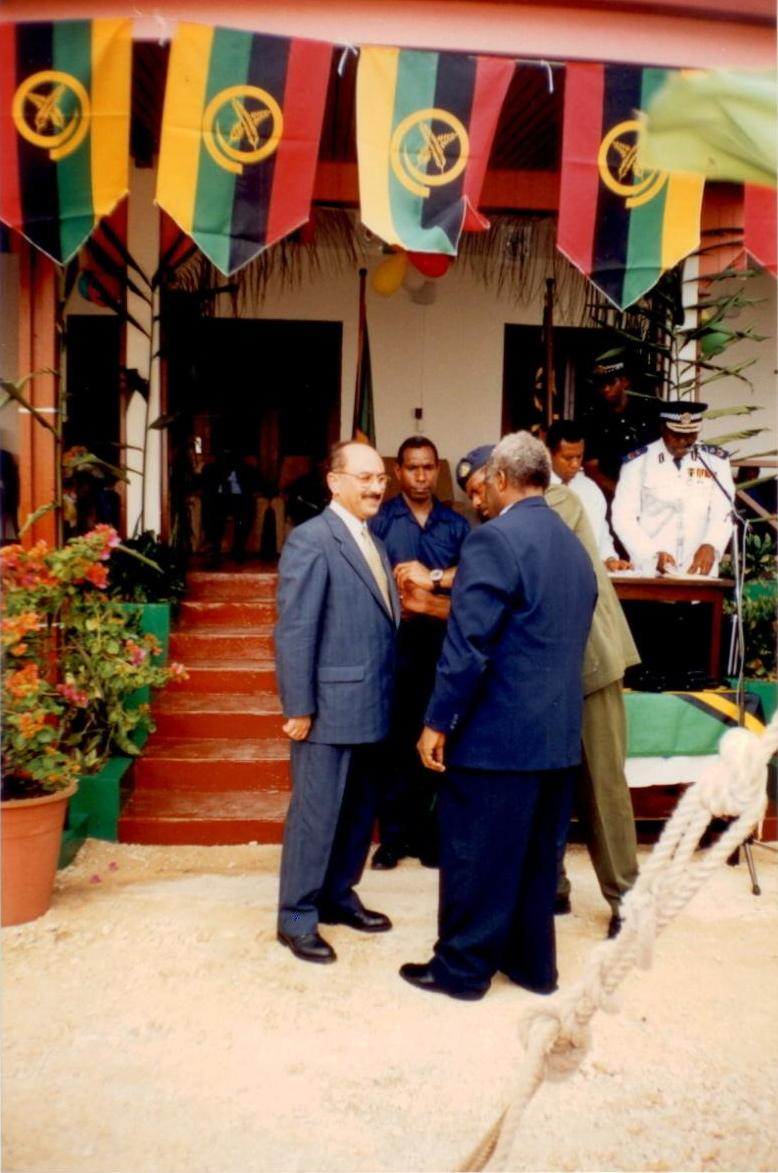
Bani giving a medal to Ali Kazak in 2000.

John Bennett Bani (born 1 July 1941) is a former Vanuatuan politician who was the president of Vanuatu from 25 March 1999 to 24 March 2004. He is an Anglican priest from Pentecost Island, and is one of the founders of the Cultural Association which later became the Vanua'aku Pati.

== See also ==
- List of national leaders
