= Union of Moderate Parties =

Union of Moderate Parties Union des partis moderés
- Leader: Ishmael Kalsakau
- Founder: Maxime Carlot Korman
- Founded: 1981
- Merger of: New Hebrides Federal Party, Moderate Party
- Ideology: Liberal conservatism Decentralisation; Francophone interests
- Political position: Centre-right
- Parliament: 6 / 52
- Port Vila Municipal Council: 3 / 18

Party flag

Website
- Facebook page

The Union of Moderate Parties (French: Union des partis moderés) is a liberal political party in Vanuatu founded in 1981. At the last general election, held on 22 January 2016, they won 9.73% of the vote and 6 seats. It is currently headed by Ishmael Kalsakau.

The party's influence grew after internal difficulties caused the Vanua'aku Pati government to fall in 1991. The UMP was the governing party in Vanuatu from 1991 to 1998. Former prime ministers Maxime Carlot Korman and Serge Vohor came from this party. However, the UMP suffered internal struggles of its own, and in the late 1990s, Corman left to form the Vanuatu Republican Party. Serge Vohor who hails from the Island Of Santo remains the president of UMP. It won 12 seats in the 1998 elections, 15 seats in the 2002 elections and 9 seats in the 2004 elections. Despite the obvious setback, Vohor was able to form a coalition government in August 2004, but lost a confidence vote four months later. From then until the 2008 elections, Vohor and the UMP sometimes were coalition partners in the Lini government, and at other times were in the opposition, serving as the largest opposition force. After the 2008 elections, the party remains an important political grouping, but is not expected to form the next government.

Serge Vohor led the party from 1988 to 2022. In February 2012, he was re-elected leader of the party, prior to the general election in October. This marks a longevity record for the leadership of any political party in Vanuatu. However, in August 2022, he lost the leadership position at the UMP congress to Ishmael Kalsakau by a vote of 45 delegates to 22. After the party congress, Vohor left the party and formed a new party called the Pikinini Along Graon (Children of the Land) Movement.

Following the October 2022 snap election Ishamel Kalsakau, who had been deputy prime minister in the previous cabinet, was appointed prime minister with the support of the previous Leader of Opposition, Ralph Regenvanu of the Land and Justice Party.

== Election results ==
Parliament
Election	Leader	Votes	%	Seats	+/–	Government
1983	Maxime Carlot Korman	12,647	28.64 (#2)	12 / 39	New	Opposition
1987	Maxime Carlot Korman	22,443	39.87 (#2)	19 / 46	▲7	Opposition
1991	Maxime Carlot Korman	19,016	30.58 (#1)	19 / 46	0	Coalition
1995	Maxime Carlot Korman	20,865	27.44 (#2)	17 / 50	▼2	Coalition
1998	Serge Vohor	13,833	20.06 (#2)	12 / 52	▼5	Opposition
2002	Serge Vohor	11,989	15.15 (#2)	15 / 52	▲3	Opposition
2004	Serge Vohor	13,852	15.02 (#1)	8 / 52	▼7	Coalition
2008	Serge Vohor	11,223	10.67 (#3)	7 / 52	▼1	Opposition
2012	Serge Vohor	14,675	12.19 (#1)	5 / 52	▼2	Opposition
2016	Serge Vohor	10,999	9.73 (#2)	6 / 52	▲1	Coalition
2020	Ishmael Kalsakau	11,043	7.67 (#5)	5 / 52	▼1	Coalition
2022	Ishmael Kalsakau	15,223	11.51 (#2)	7 / 52	▲2	Coalition
2025	Ishmael Kalsakau	22,663	15.51 (#1)	6 / 52	▼1	Opposition
