= Supreme Court of Vanuatu =

Highest court of jurisdiction in Vanuatu

- Jurisdiction: Civil matters, Criminal matters, Constitutional matters
- Location: Port Vila
- Authorised by: Constitution of Vanuatu
- Appeals to: Court of Appeal
- Appeals from: Magistrate's Courts
- Number of positions: 4; one Chief Justice, three puisne judges
- Website: https://courts.gov.vu/about-us/supreme-court

Chief Justice
- Currently: Vincent Lunabek
- Since: 2001

Supreme Court of Vanuatu is the superior court of Vanuatu and is based in Port Vila. The Court consists of the Chief Justice and three puisne judges.

Appeals from the Supreme Court are heard by the Court of Appeal of Vanuatu, which is the supreme appellate court in the country. The Court of Appeal is constituted from time to time as the need arises.

With the exception of the Chief Justice, all members of the judiciary are appointed by the President of Vanuatu, who acts on the advice of the Judicial Service Commission, pursuant to Article 47(2) of the Constitution of Vanuatu). The Chief Justice is appointed by the President after consultation with the Prime Minister and the Leader of the Opposition, pursuant to Article 49(3) of the Constitution.

The present Chief Justice of the Court is Vincent Lunabek.

== Chief Justices ==
Chief Justices of the Court have included:

- Frederick George Cooke (1980–90)
- Edwin Goldsborough (acting) (1991)
- Charles Vaudin d'Imecourt (1992–98)
- Vincent Lunabek (acting) (1997–2000)
- Vincent Lunabek (2001–)

In 1997, Chief Justice Vaudin d'Imecourt was not allowed in the country, leading to the case of Vaudin d'Imecourt v Manatawai [1997] VUSC 53.

== Puisne judges ==
The Court has had the following past and present puisne judges:

- Serge Braudo (1980)
- J.R. Jones (1983)
- L. Cazendres (1983–85)
- W Kattan (1983)
- Williams (1985–86)
- Coakley (1986–87)
- Amet (1986)
- Gordon Ward (1988–91)
- Edwin Goldsborough (1988–92)
- Peter Heerey (1992)
- Beaumont (1993)
- John von Doussa (1993, 1998–99, 2003)
- Rowan Downing (1993–95)
- Harry Gibbs (1994)
- Robert Kent (1994–95)
- Salatiel Lenalia (1995)
- Vincent Lunabek (1996–2000) (appointed Chief Justice 2001)
- Thorp (1996)
- Kalkot Mataskelekele (1996–98)
- Oliver Saksak (1997–2006)
- Regget Marum MBE (1997–2002)
- Tompkins (1998)
- Muria (1999)
- Roger Coventry (2000–03)
- DJ Carruthers (2003)
- Robertson (2003)
- Fatiaki (2003)
- Coventry (2003)
- PI Treston (2003–06)
- Hamlison Bulu (2003–06)
- Christpher Tuohy (2006–2008)
- Nevin Dawson (2008-2010)
- Robert Spear (2011-2013)
- Stephen Harrop (2014-2015)
- Paul Geoghegan (2016-2017)
- Gus Andre Wiltons (2018-2022
- Viran Molisa Trief (2019–)
- Bill Hastings (judge) (2023-2024)
