= Parliament of Vanuatu =

Legislature of Vanuatu

Coordinates: 17°44′44″S 168°18′56″E

Parliament of Vanuatu Palamen blong Vanuatu Parlement du Vanuatu
- 14th Parliament

Type
- Type: Unicameral

History
- Founded: July 1980
- Preceded by: New Hebrides Representative Assembly

Leadership
- Speaker: Stephen Dorrick Felix, LPV since 11 February 2025
- Prime Minister: Jotham Napat, LPV since 11 February 2025
- Leader of the Opposition: Ishmael Kalsakau, UMP since 4 September 2024

Structure
- Seats: 52 members
- Political groups: Government (40): LPV (12); IG (9); VP (7); GJP (6); RMC (6); Opposition (12): UMP (6); RDP (6)
- Length of term: 4 years

Elections
- Voting system: Single non-transferable vote
- Last election: 16 January 2025

Meeting place
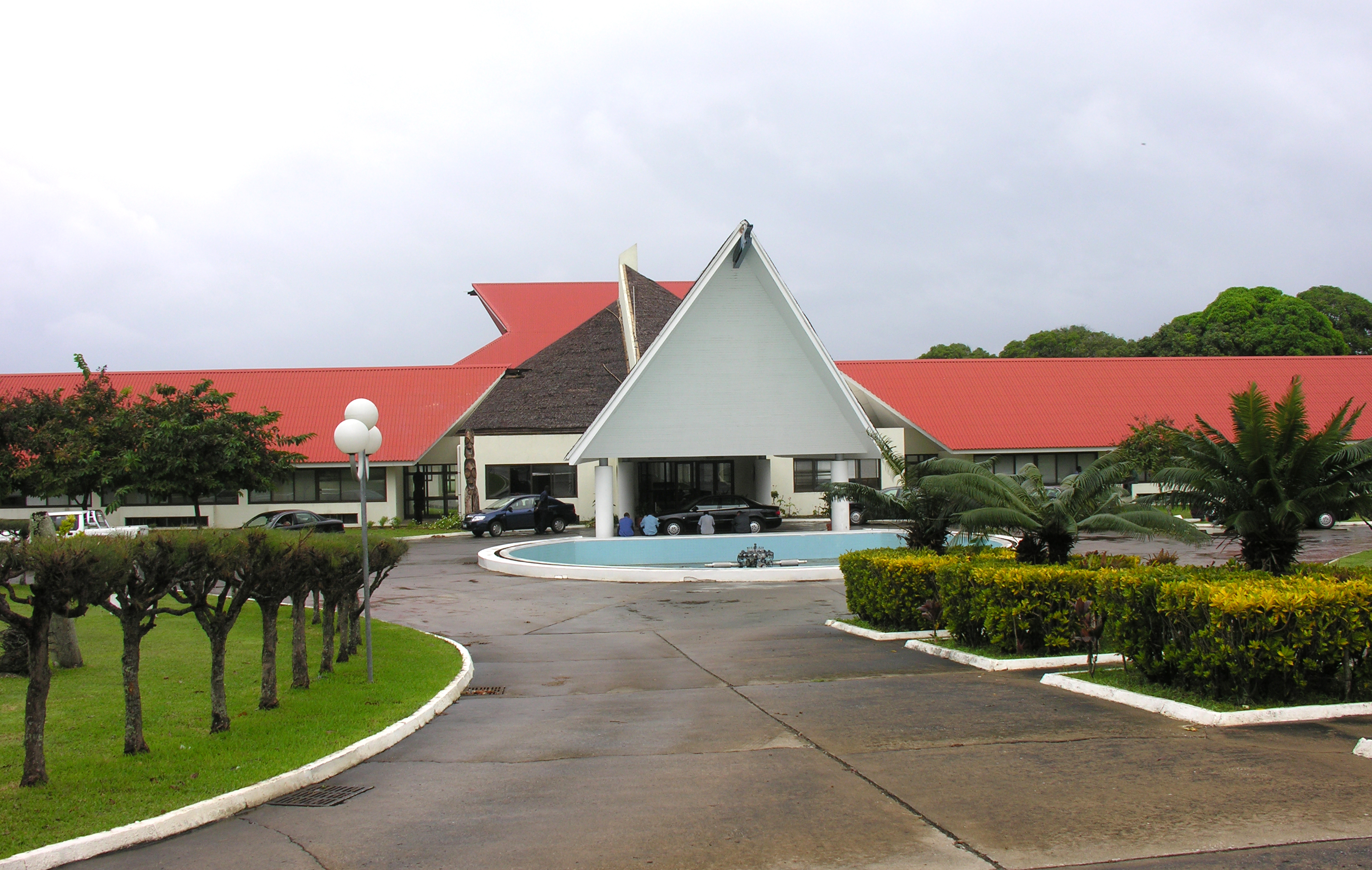
- Parliament House, Port Vila

Website
- parliament.gov.vu

The Parliament of Vanuatu (Bislama: Palamen blong Vanuatu; French: Parlement du Vanuatu) is the unicameral legislative body of the Republic of Vanuatu.

It was established by chapter 4 of the 1980 Constitution, upon Vanuatu's independence from France and the United Kingdom.

The functioning of Parliament is derived from the British Westminster system, and includes the principle of parliamentary supremacy, within the limits of the Constitution. The President, as a figurehead, may not veto parliamentary legislation, unless he considers it may be contrary to the Constitution, in which case he may refer it to the Supreme Court, and veto it only if the Supreme Court declares it to be contrary to the Constitution. Parliament is composed of fifty-two members, directly elected by citizens from multi-member constituencies for a four-year term.

Parliament elects the Prime Minister from among its members. Members of Parliament are also, along with the presidents of Regional Councils, members of the electoral college which elects the President, for a five-year term.

The current Speaker of the Parliament is the Hon. Stephen Dorrick Felix who has held the position since February 2025.

== Members ==
This is a list of members of the 14th Parliament of Vanuatu returned in the 2025 elections. As a result of the 2024 Vanuatuan constitutional referendum, those members elected as independents or as the only representative of their party were required to affiliate with a larger group. These affiliations were announced on May 16th 2025.

Constituency	Winning candidate	Party at Election	Party after Affiliation
Ambae (3 seats)	Jay Ngwele	Rural Development Party	
Ambae (3 seats)	Jean Jacques Ngwele	Iauko Group	
Ambae (3 seats)	Qetu John Still Tari	Iauko Group	
Ambrym (2 seats)	Basil Buleban	Rural Development Party	
Ambrym (2 seats)	Dahmasing John Salong	Land and Justice Party	
Banks	Danny Sailas	Leaders Party of Vanuatu	
Efate (5 seats)	Stephen Dorrick Felix	Leaders Party of Vanuatu	
Efate (5 seats)	Norris Jack Kalmet	Reunification Movement for Change	
Efate (5 seats)	Matai Manalka Kaltabang	Iauko Group	
Efate (5 seats)	Jesse Luo	Union of Moderate Parties	
Efate (5 seats)	Fred Lui Samuel	Vanua'aki Parti	
Epi (2 seats)	Robert Murray Bohn	Vanuatu Progressive Development Party	Iauko Group
Epi (2 seats)	Seoule Davidson Simeon (until 3 Dec 2025)^{a}	Laverwo Movement	Vanua'aku Pati
Epi (2 seats)	John Nil Supwo (from 19 Dec 2025)^{b}	Vanuatu Progressive Development Party^{c}	Iauko Group
Luganville (2 seats)	Marc Ati	Iauko Group	
Luganville (2 seats)	Seremaiah Matai Nawalu	Leaders Party of Vanuatu	
Maewo	Ian Toakalana Wilson	Ngwasoanda Custom Movement	Leaders Party of Vanuatu
Malekula (7 seats)	Marcellino Barthelemy	Reunification Movement for Change	
Malekula (7 seats)	Gracia Chadrack	Rural Development Party	
Malekula (7 seats)	Anatole Hymak	Union of Moderate Parties	
Malekula (7 seats)	Jones Malnimbwen	Leaders Party of Vanuatu	
Malekula (7 seats)	Micha Oliver	Rural Development Party	
Malekula (7 seats)	Paul Paolo	Land and Justice Party	
Malekula (7 seats)	Alick Terry	Land and Justice Party	
Malo–Aore	Allan Molvoke Liki	Union of Moderate Parties	
Paama	Sam Job Andy	Leaders Party of Vanuatu	
Pentecost (4 seats)	Maty Phen Lange	National United Party	Leaders Party of Vanuatu
Pentecost (4 seats)	Marc Muelsul	Rural Development Party	
Pentecost (4 seats)	Charlot Tabimasmas Salwai	Reunification Movement for Change	
Pentecost (4 seats)	Blaise Sumptoh	Rural Development Party	
Port Vila (5 seats)	Anthony Iaris Harry	Union of Moderate Parties	
Port Vila (5 seats)	Ataloi Ishmael Ma'aukoro Kalsakau	Union of Moderate Parties	
Port Vila (5 seats)	Jackson Lessa	Leaders Party of Vanuatu	
Port Vila (5 seats)	Marie-Louise Paulette Milne	Green Confederation	Iauko Group
Port Vila (5 seats)	Ralph Regenvanu	Land and Justice Party	
Santo (7 seats)	Camillo Ati	Iauko Group	
Santo (7 seats)	Robson Nalan Iavro	Vanua'aku Pati	
Santo (7 seats)	John Lum	Namarakiena Movement	Land and Justice Party
Santo (7 seats)	Rick Tchamako Mahe	Reunification Movement for Change	
Santo (7 seats)	Gaetan Pikioune	Independent	Reunification Movement for Change
Santo (7 seats)	Samson Samsen	Vanua'aku Pati	
Santo (7 seats)	Franklyn Ezra William	Reunification Movement for Change	
Shepherds	John William Timakata	Vanua'aku Pati	
Southern Outer Islands^{d}	Tomker Netvunei	Leaders Party of Vanuatu	
Tanna (7 seats)	Xavier Emanuel Harry	Iauko Group	
Tanna (7 seats)	Johnny Rasu Koanapo	Vanua'aku Pati	
Tanna (7 seats)	Jotham Napat	Leaders Party of Vanuatu	
Tanna (7 seats)	Andrew Solomon Napuat	Land and Justice Party	
Tanna (7 seats)	Andrew Wilbur Napuat	Union of Moderate Parties	
Tanna (7 seats)	James Noumeta	Leaders Party of Vanuatu	
Tanna (7 seats)	Johnson Kalptu Youse Simil	Vanua'aku Pati	
Tongoa	John Vacher Amos	Namarakieana Movement	Leaders Party of Vanuatu
Torres	John Joseph	Vanua'aku Pati	
^a Seat declared vacated following Simeon receiving a 2 year, 6 month jail sentence for corruption.^b 3rd place finisher in the 2025 Election, declared elected due to receiving over 70% of the vote.^c Designation Nils ran under in the 2025 General Election.^d Also known as Erromongo. Source: Parliament of Vanuatu

== See also ==
- List of parliamentary constituencies of Vanuatu
- Law of Vanuatu
- Politics of Vanuatu
- List of speakers of the Parliament of Vanuatu
- List of legislatures by country
