= Vanua'aku Pati =

- Abbreviation: VP
- Leader: Johnny Koanapo
- Founder: Walter Lini; Donald Kalpokas
- Founded: 17 August 1971
- Ideology: Melanesian socialism Democratic socialism Vanuatuan nationalism Anglophone interests
- Political position: Centre-left to left-wing
- Colours: Green; Red; Black
- Slogan: Seli Hoo (lit. 'pull together')
- Parliament: 7 / 52
- Port Vila Municipal Council: 4 / 18

Party flag

Website
- Facebook page
- Politics of Vanuatu; Political parties; Elections; Formerly; New Hebridean Cultural Association (1971); New Hebrides National Party (1971–1977)

The Vanua'aku Pati (lit. 'Party of My Land' or 'Party of Our Land') is a socialist political party in Vanuatu.

== History ==
The party was founded on 17 August 1971 by Walter Lini as the New Hebridean Cultural Association, renamed later that same year as the New Hebrides National Party. It was one of two parties formed during the country's move towards independence. While the NHNP was supported by British interests, the Union of New Hebrides Communities was supported by French interests. The NHNP went on to win the 1975 elections. In 1977, it was renamed the Vanua'aku Pati. The party won the pre-independence 1979 elections and Lini became chief minister. The country gained independence in 1980 and Lini became the first Prime Minister of Vanuatu, remaining in the post until 1991. In 1991, the party split and Lini was among those who left the party.

After the 1991 elections, the party lost its dominance over the government. Despite this, the party remained strong. During the next decade, as party members Donald Kalpokas and Edward Natapei served as prime ministers of Vanuatu. The party began steadily losing seats in the early 2000s; It took 18 in the 1998 elections, 14 in the 2002 elections, and 8 in the 2004 elections, a setback which forced Prime Minister Natapei to resign. The party suffered another split after the elections, as the leadership refused to support the national coalition government of Serge Vohor while two Vanua'aku Party representatives supported this government, allowing it to take office. However, after a controversy over the diplomatic recognition of Taiwan and China, the Vanua'aku Party reunited in December 2004 and was involved in the effort to oust Vohor. It remained influential and was a key supporter of the National United Party government of Walter Lini's brother Ham Lini which lasted from December 2004 through the September 2008 elections. After a short break from participation in the coalition government, the party returned in July 2007 when its leader, former prime minister Edward Natapei, became deputy prime minister. The party had a strong result in the September 2008 elections, gaining 11 of the 52 results, making this party the largest one in Parliament and allowing Natapei to return as prime minister.

After multiple attempts to remove Natapei, he was forced out by a vote of no confidence on 2 December 2010, replaced by opposition leader Sato Kilman. Natapei was temporarily reinstated on 16 June 2011 when the Supreme Court of Vanuatu ruled Kilman's election as prime minister violated the Vanuatu constitution. A new election was held on 26 June of that year, in which Kilman was reinstated.

The party lost three seats in the parliamentary elections of 30 October 2012; however, it remained the largest single party in parliament. Following Kilman's resignation in 2013 the party joined the governing coalition, first with Edward Natapei as vice prime minister in Moana Carcasses Kalosil's cabinet and then in 2014 with Joe Natuman becoming prime minister himself. His government lasted just one year, after which 3 MPs crossed the floor allowing Sato Kilman to take back the office.

In the 2016 election, the party lost two more seats, becoming the second biggest party tied with UMP. The VP initially joined Charlot Salwai's government coalition that emerged after the election, but it was replaced by the Leaders Party of Vanuatu in a cabinet reshuffle that took place in 2018.

In the 2020 election, the party won 7 seats, one more than in 2016, but remained the second biggest party. Despite that, its new leader, Bob Loughman, was appointed prime minister, a position that he kept until August 2022, when he asked the President to dissolve the Parliament to avoid a no-confidence vote. As a result of the subsequent snap election, the party retained all of its seats but ended up in opposition of the newly formed government, led by Bob Loughman's former vice PM Ishmael Kalsakau.

The name of the Vanua'aku Party means "Party of My Land" or "Party of Our Land" in English (from the word vanua). It supports socialist economic policies and is mostly supported by English speakers.

== Election results ==
Parliament
Election	Leader	Votes	%	Seats	+/–	Government
1975	Walter Lini	27,978	54.19 (#1)	17 / 29	New	Opposition
1977	Walter Lini	Boycotted		0 / 38	▼17	Extra-parliamentary
1979	Walter Lini	28,636	60.77 (#1)	25 / 39	▲25	Majority
1983	Walter Lini	24,313	55.05 (#1)	24 / 39	▼1	Majority
1987	Walter Lini	26,617	47.28 (#1)	26 / 46	▲2	Majority
1991	Donald Kalpokas	14,058	22.61 (#2)	10 / 46	▼16	Opposition
1995	Donald Kalpokas	23,911	31.45 (#1)	13 / 50	▲3	Opposition
1998	Donald Kalpokas	14,467	20.98 (#1)	18 / 52	▲5	Coalition
2002	Edward Natapei	13,509	17.07 (#1)	14 / 52	▼4	Coalition
2004	Edward Natapei	12,819	13.90 (#2)	8 / 52	▼6	Coalition
2008	Edward Natapei	15,479	14.71 (#1)	11 / 52	▲3	Coalition
2012	Edward Natapei	13,593	11.29 (#2)	8 / 52	▼3	Coalition
2016	Joe Natuman	13,463	11.91 (#1)	6 / 52	▼2	Coalition
2020	Bob Loughman	17,460	12.12 (#2)	7 / 52	▲1	Coalition
2022	Bob Loughman	20,511	15.50 (#1)	7 / 52	0	Opposition
2025	Johnny Koanapo	21,473	14.70 (#2)	7 / 52	0	Coalition
