= List of members of the Parliament of Vanuatu (2008–2012) =

The 52 members of the Parliament of Vanuatu from 2008 to 2012 were elected on 2 September 2008.

== List of members ==
Constituency	Member	Party	Notes
Ambae	James Bule	National United Party	
Ambae	Peter Vuta	People's Action Party	
Ambae	James Wango	People's Progress Party	
Ambrym	Jossie Masmas	Vanuatu Republican Party	
Ambrym	Raphael Worwor	Union of Moderate Parties	
Banks and Torres	Dunstan Hilton	People's Progress Party	
Banks and Torres	Thomas Sawon	National United Party	
Efate	Alfred Rolland Carlot	Vanuatu Republican Party	
Efate	Joshua Kalsakau	Vanuatu Labour Party	
Efate	Pakoa Kaltonga	Vanua'aku Pati	
Efate	Roro Sambo	National United Party	
Epi	Isaac Hamariliu	Vanuatu National Party	
Epi	Leinavao Tasso	Vanua'aku Pati	
Luganville	Dominique Morin	Vanuatu Republican Party	
Luganville	George Wells	National United Party	
Maewo	Philip Boedoro	Vanua'aku Pati	
Malekula	Donna Browny	Vanuatu Republican Party	
Malekula	Sato Kilman	People's Progress Party	
Malekula	Eta Rory	Vanuatu Family First Party	
Malekula	Esmon Saimon	Melanesian Progressive Party	
Malekula	Don Ken Stephen	Independent	
Malekula	Kisiton Teilemb	Union of Moderate Parties	
Malekula	Paul Telukluk	Namangi Aute	
Malo–Aore	Havo Molisale	Nagriamel	
Paama	David Areiasuv	People's Progress Party	
Pentecost	Bruce Asal	Union of Moderate Parties	
Pentecost	Ham Lin̄i	National United Party	
Pentecost	Charlot Salwai	Union of Moderate Parties	
Pentecost	David Tosul	National United Party	
Port Vila	Maxime Carlot Korman	Vanuatu Republican Party	
Port Vila	Patrick Crowby	National United Party	
Port Vila	Abel David	Shepherds Alliance	
Port Vila	Moana Carcasses Kalosil	Green Confederation	
Port Vila	Edward Natapei	Vanua'aku Pati	
Port Vila	Ralph Regenvanu	Independent	
Santo	Jean Ravou Akii Kolomule	Vanuatu Progressive Republican Farmers Party	
Santo	Solomon Lorin	Union of Moderate Parties	
Santo	Sela Molisa	Vanua'aku Pati	
Santo	Marcellino Pipite	Vanuatu Republican Party	
Santo	Samson Samsen	Vanuatu Republican Party	
Santo	Voiasusu Tae	Union of Moderate Parties	
Santo	Serge Vohor	Union of Moderate Parties	
Shepherds	Daniel Kalo	Green Confederation	
Southern Islands	Ture Kailo	Vanua'aku Pati	Kailo died in 2009. Philip Charley (VP) won the subsequent by-election.
Tanna	Harry Iauko	Vanua'aku Pati	
Tanna	Isaac Judah	Independent	
Tanna	Moses Kahu	Vanua'aku Pati	
Tanna	Bob Loughman	Vanua'aku Pati	
Tanna	Etap Louis	Independent	
Tanna	Steven Morking	National United Party	
Tanna	Joe Natuman	Vanua'aku Pati	
Tongoa	Willie Reuben Abel	Vanua'aku Pati	
Source: Official Gazette
