= List of members of the Parliament of Vanuatu (2004–2008) =

The 52 members of the Parliament of Vanuatu from 2004 to 2008 were elected on 6 July 2004.

== List of members ==
Constituency	Member	Party
Ambae	James Bule	National United Party
Ambae	Dickinson Vusilai	Independent
Ambae	Peter Vuta	People's Action Party
Ambrym	Jossie Masmas	Vanuatu Republican Party
Ambrym	Raphael Worwor	Union of Moderate Parties
Banks and Torres	Dunstan Hilton	People's Progress Party
Banks and Torres	Laliurou Eric Schedrac	National United Party
Efate	Joshua Kalsakau	National Community Association
Efate	Steven Kalsakau	Union of Moderate Parties
Efate	Roro Sambo	Green Confederation
Efate	Barak Sopé	Melanesian Progressive Party
Epi	Isabelle Donald	Vanua'aku Pati
Epi	Lejnavao Tasso	Independent
Erromango	Thomas Nentu	Melanesian Progressive Party
Luganville	Eric Jack	National United Party
Luganville	George Wells	Vanua'aku Pati
Maewo	Philip Boedoro	Vanua'aku Pati
Malekula	Donna Browny	Vanuatu Republican Party
Malekula	Calep Isaac	Independent
Malekula	Malon Hospmander	People's Progress Party
Malekula	Sato Kilman	People's Progress Party
Malekula	Charlie Rokrok	National United Party
Malekula	Esmon Saimon	Melanesian Progressive Party
Malekula	Paul Telukluk	Namangi Aute
Malo–Aore	Josias Moli	Union of Moderate Parties
Paama	Sam Avok	Vanua'aku Pati
Pentecost	Ham Lin̄i	National United Party
Pentecost	Charlot Salwai	Union of Moderate Parties
Pentecost	David Tosul	National United Party
Pentecost	Noel Tamata	People's Progress Party
Port Vila	Maxime Carlot Korman	Vanuatu Republican Party
Port Vila	Moana Carcasses Kalosil	Green Confederation
Port Vila	Willie Jimmy	National United Party
Port Vila	Edward Natapei	Vanua'aku Pati
Port Vila	Henry Tarikarea	Union of Moderate Parties
Port Vila	Pierre Tore	Independent
Santo	Phiip Andikar	Independent
Santo	John Lum	Independent
Santo	Sela Molisa	Vanua'aku Pati
Santo	Sandie Iavcuth	National United Party
Santo	Arnold Prasad	Green Confederation
Santo	Marcellino Pipite	Vanuatu Republican Party
Santo	Serge Vohor	Union of Moderate Parties
Shepherds	Daniel Kalo	Union of Moderate Parties
Tanna	Isaac Judah	Union of Moderate Parties
Tanna	Moses Kahu	Vanua'aku Pati
Tanna	Bob Loughman	Independent
Tanna	Etap Louis	Independent
Tanna	Steven Morking	National United Party
Tanna	Joe Natuman	Vanua'aku Pati
Tanna	Keasipai Song	National Community Association
Tongoa	Tom Seule	National United Party
Source: Official Gazette
