= 2009 Vanuatuan by-elections =

Four by-elections to the Parliament of Vanuatu were held in 2009 to fill seven vacant seats.

== Efate ==
The by-election was held in the constituency of Efate on 6 August 2009, after a Supreme Court ruling removed four MPs from Parliament because they had either used inducements to win their seats, or had won due to electoral irregularities.

Candidate	Party	Votes	%
Pakoa Kaltonga	Vanua'aku Pati	1,515	14.86
Steven Kalsakau	Union of Moderate Parties	1,015	9.96
Alfred Rolland Carlot	Vanuatu Republican Party	986	9.67
Joshua Kalsakau	Vanuatu Labour Party	942	9.24
Jimmy Luna Tasong	Independent	925	9.07
Barak Sopé	Melanesian Progressive Party	827	8.11
Kalmele Matai	Vanua'aku Pati	742	7.28
Roro Sambo	Alliance	636	6.24
William Malas	National Community Association	594	5.83
Andrew Samuel	Traditional Kavening Authority	450	4.41
Ephraim Kalsakau	Independent	410	4.02
Harry Man Kalsong	Vanuatu Democratic Protection Party	288	2.83
Eric Pakoa Markiwola	Independent	236	2.32
Lilly Lui	Independent	179	1.76
Warewo Rave Chilia	National United Party	138	1.35
Joel Kaltang	Alliance	135	1.32
Jean Pierre Serel	Independent	117	1.15
Hendon Kalsakau	Independent	59	0.58
Total		10,194	100.00
Valid votes		10,194	98.87
Invalid/blank votes		116	1.13
Total votes		10,310	100.00
Registered voters/turnout		21,282	48.44

== Epi ==
The by-election was held in the constituency of Epi on 5 February 2009, after Leinavao Tasso was removed after being accused of bribing voters.

Candidate	Party	Votes	%
Ioane Simon Omawa	Independent	651	25.78
Leinavao Tasso	Vanua'aku Pati	638	25.27
John Roy Nil	Independent	617	24.44
Isabelle Donald	Independent	301	11.92
Seule Simeon	Vanuatu National Party	220	8.71
Joe Jimmy	Shepherds Alliance	98	3.88
Total		2,525	100.00
Valid votes		2,525	98.40
Invalid/blank votes		41	1.60
Total votes		2,566	100.00
Registered voters/turnout		3,437	74.66

== Southern Islands ==
The by-election was held in the constituency of the Southern Islands on 15 December 2009.

The constituency covers four of the five islands of Tafea Province (Aniwa, Futuna, Erromango and Anatom, excluding only Tanna). It elects a single representative to Vanuatu. The by-election was due to the death of sitting MP Ture Kailo, of the Vanua'aku Party, who had died suddenly in October while attending a seminar organised by the Australian government in Canberra.

The seat was retained by the Vanua'aku Party; its candidate, Philip Charley, finished "well ahead" of the candidates from the Union of Moderate Parties and the National United Party.

Candidate	Party	Votes	%
Philip Charley Norwo	Vanua'aku Pati	929	52.57
Tomkor Netvunei	Union of Moderate Parties	446	25.24
Marsel Wilson Manua	National United Party	392	22.18
Total		1,767	100.00
Valid votes		1,767	99.66
Invalid/blank votes		6	0.34
Total votes		1,773	100.00
Registered voters/turnout		2,369	74.84

== Tanna ==
The by-election was held in the constituency of Tanna on 30 April 2009, after a Supreme Court ruling removed Judah Issac after he was found guilty of bribery.

Candidate	Party	Votes	%
Willie Lop	People's Progressive Party	3,244	34.90
Tom Ierongen	Vanua'aku Pati	2,845	30.61
Sabi Nantonga	National Community Association	1,971	21.21
Judah Issac	Vanuatu Republican Party	634	6.82
Kasipai Song	Independent	589	6.34
Walu Shark	Independent	11	0.12
Total		9,294	100.00
Valid votes		9,294	97.34
Invalid/blank votes		254	2.66
Total votes		9,548	100.00
Registered voters/turnout		21,500	44.41
