= List of members of the Parliament of Vanuatu (2002–2004) =

The 52 members of the Parliament of Vanuatu from 2002 to 2004 were elected on 2 May 2002.

== List of members ==
Constituency	Member	Party
Ambae	Samson Bue	Union of Moderate Parties
Ambae	James Bule	National United Party
Ambae	Jacques Sese	Union of Moderate Parties
Ambrym	Roger Abiut	Independent
Ambrym	Raphael Worwor	Union of Moderate Parties
Banks and Torres	Nicholas Brown	Independent
Banks and Torres	Barnabas Wilson	National United Party
Efate	Donald Kalpokas	Vanua'aku Pati
Efate	Steven Kalsakau	Union of Moderate Parties
Efate	Jimmy Meto Chilia	National United Party
Efate	Barak Sopé	Melanesian Progressive Party
Epi	Isabelle Donald	Vanua'aku Pati
Epi	Jean Galibert	Vanuatu Republican Party
Erromango	Thomas Nithitauei	Vanua'aku Pati
Luganville	François Baba	Union of Moderate Parties
Luganville	George Wells	Vanua'aku Pati
Maewo	Philip Boedoro	Vanua'aku Pati
Malekula	Donna Browny	Vanuatu Republican Party
Malekula	Sato Kilman	People's Progress Party
Malekula	John Morrisen	Vanua'aku Pati
Malekula	Japeth Nawilau	Independent
Malekula	Esmon Saimon	Melanesian Progressive Party
Malekula	Paul Telukluk	Namangi Aute
Malekula	Jackleen Ruben Titek	Vanua'aku Pati
Malo–Aore	Leo Tamata	Vanua'aku Pati
Paama	Sam Avok	Vanua'aku Pati
Pentecost	Ham Lin̄i	National United Party
Pentecost	Charlot Tabimasmas	Union of Moderate Parties
Pentecost	David Tosul	National United Party
Pentecost	Michael Ture	Independent
Port Vila	Maxime Carlot Korman	Vanuatu Republican Party
Port Vila	Job Dalesa	Vanua'aku Pati
Port Vila	Moana Carcasses Kalosil	Green Confederation
Port Vila	Willie Jimmy	National United Party
Port Vila	Edward Natapei	Vanua'aku Pati
Port Vila	Henry Tarikarea	Union of Moderate Parties
Santo	Phiip Andikar	Independent
Santo	Jimmy Imbert	Union of Moderate Parties
Santo	Jean-Alain Mahe	Union of Moderate Parties
Santo	Sela Molisa	Vanua'aku Pati
Santo	Denis Philip	Union of Moderate Parties
Santo	Albert Ravutia	Fren Melanesian Party
Santo	Serge Vohor	Union of Moderate Parties
Shepherds	Daniel Kalo	Union of Moderate Parties
Tanna	Isaac Judah	Union of Moderate Parties
Tanna	Francois Koapa	Union of Moderate Parties
Tanna	Steven Morking	National United Party
Tanna	Joe Natuman	Vanua'aku Pati
Tanna	Jimmy Nicklam	Vanua'aku Pati
Tanna	Willy Posen	Union of Moderate Parties
Tanna	Keasipai Song	Green Confederation
Tongoa	Seule Tom	National United Party
Source: Official Gazette
