= 2008 Vanuatuan general election =

- 2 September 2008
- All 52 seats in Parliament; 26 seats needed for a majority
Party	Leader	Vote %	Seats	+/–
Vanua'aku Pati	Edward Natapei	14.71	11	+3
National United	Ham Lini	11.64	8	−2
UMP	Serge Vohor	10.67	7	−1
Republican	Maxime Carlot Korman	7.75	7	+3
People's Progressive	Sato Kilman	5.14	4	0
Green Confederation		3.44	2	−1
National		3.31	1	+1
Melanesian Progressive		2.92	1	−2
Labour		2.91	1	+1
Nagriamel		2.87	1	+1
Family First		2.22	1	New
People's Action		1.72	1	0
Namangi Aute		1.12	1	0
Shepherds Alliance		0.96	1	New
VPRFP		0.80	1	New
Independents	–	20.31	4	−4
This lists parties that won seats. See the complete results below.
Prime Minister before	Subsequent Prime Minister
Ham Lini; National United	Edward Natapei; Vanua'aku Pati

General elections were held in Vanuatu on 2 September 2008. In July the Melanesian Progressive Party requested that they be postponed, contesting the constitutionality of the Peoples Representation Act No. 33 of 2007, which allegedly enabled voters in certain constituencies to vote in two constituencies. The Principal Electoral Officer, Martin Tete, confirmed that the election would take place on 2 September, as scheduled. The day was declared a national holiday, to encourage people to vote.

Over three hundred candidates, of which nine women, stood for election, representing twenty-five political parties and approximately eighty independents. There were 170,000 registered voters, and fifty-two seats to fill in Parliament in 17 multi-member constituencies.

== Preliminary results ==
Unofficial preliminary results were expected on 3 September 2008, with official results expected to take up to a week. Two veteran politicians, the incumbent finance minister Willie Jimmy and former PM Barak Sopé, appear to have failed to be reelected, while the independent Ralph Regenvanu appeared to have got the most votes in his constituency of Port Vila and the leaders of the Green Confederation (Moana Carcasses) as well as of the Vanuatu Republican Party (Maxime Carlot Korman) as well as the deputy PM Edward Natapei were returned to parliament.

According to unofficial results, the ruling coalition was likely returned to power in the election; about 18 of the 49 MPs standing for re-election were not reelected, and Vanuatu's oldest party, the Vanua'aku Party, was seen to have gained the largest number of seats with 10 seats. Prime Minister Ham Lini's National United Party appears to have won at least seven seats, as have the Vanuatu Republican Party and the Union of Moderate Parties. Nine other parties and five independents also appear to have made it into Parliament.

The Vanuatu Electoral Commission has announced that it will take several days before official results are available, and ABC Radio Australia reports that, due to negotiations in establishing a ruling coalition once results are known, "it could be a week or two before it's clear just who will be leading the next Vanuatu government".

On 9 September, it was reported that the Vanua'aku Party (VP) and the National United Party were negotiating to form a coalition government, which would also include at least one more party. Under the agreement the new coalition government would include 33 of the 52 members of parliament. Deputy PM and VP leader Edward Natapei would become Prime Minister, while outgoing Prime Minister Ham Lini would become Natapei's Deputy Prime Minister. However, the leader of the Vanuatu Republican Party, Maxime Korman, now claims he has enough votes to form his own government and become prime minister. The ultimate results of the election are still unpredictable.

== Results ==
Final results were announced on 10 September 2008. The Vanua'aku Party had won the most seats (11 out of 52) and Edward Natapei was expected to become prime minister; he was expected to select outgoing prime minister Ham Lini (National United Party) as his deputy. However, Maxime Carlot Korman of the Vanuatu Republican Party also claimed he had enough votes to form the government. Natapei was elected by Parliament on 22 September, winning with 27 to 25 votes against Korman in a secret ballot.

Party	Votes	%	Seats	+/–
Vanua'aku Pati	15,479	14.71	11	+3
National United Party	12,249	11.64	8	–2
Union of Moderate Parties	11,223	10.67	7	–1
Vanuatu Republican Party	8,155	7.75	7	+3
People's Progressive Party	5,407	5.14	4	0
Green Confederation	3,619	3.44	2	–1
Vanuatu National Party	3,481	3.31	1	+1
Melanesian Progressive Party	3,067	2.92	1	–2
Vanuatu Labour Party	3,058	2.91	1	+1
Nagriamel	3,016	2.87	1	+1
National Community Association	2,437	2.32	0	–2
Vanuatu Family First Party	2,336	2.22	1	New
People's Action Party	1,812	1.72	1	0
Muvment blong Chiefs	1,510	1.44	0	New
Namangi Aute	1,178	1.12	1	0
Shepherds Alliance	1,012	0.96	1	New
Vanuatu Democratic Protection Party	966	0.92	0	New
Vanuatu Progressive Republican Farmers Party	837	0.80	1	New
Union blong Democratic Kastom Laef Movement	610	0.58	0	New
Reassemble the Union Movement for the People of Vanuatu	563	0.54	0	New
Vanuatu Liberal Party	391	0.37	0	New
Tomburin Kastom Muvment	330	0.31	0	New
Vanuatu Christian Party	303	0.29	0	New
Friend Melanesian Party	270	0.26	0	0
Popular Movement	253	0.24	0	New
Melanesian Alliance	151	0.14	0	New
Union Liberation Front	80	0.08	0	New
Kristian Demokrotic Party	32	0.03	0	New
United Liberation Front	7	0.01	0	New
Independents	21,365	20.31	4	–4
Total	105,197	100.00	52	0
Valid votes	105,197	98.59		
Invalid/blank votes	1,505	1.41		
Total votes	106,702	100.00		
Registered voters/turnout	152,043	70.18		
Source: Extraordinary Gazette

=== By constituency ===
Ambae
Candidate	Party	Votes	%
Peter Vuta	People's Action Party	795	16.57
James Bule	National United Party	676	14.09
James Wango	People's Progressive Party	380	7.92
Dickinson Vusilai	Vanua'aku Pati	345	7.19
Fred Tari	Independent	318	6.63
Steven Tahi	Nagriamel	294	6.13
Edmond Hoke	Nagriamel	282	5.88
Jacob Mata	Vanua'aku Pati	277	5.77
Manley Tariliu	Melanesian Progressive Party	221	4.61
John Colwick Tari	Green Confederation	175	3.65
Jenny Ligo	Independent	165	3.44
Manasseh Tari	Vanua'aku Pati	163	3.40
Jacques Sésé	Union of Moderate Parties	163	3.40
Barnabas Bani	National Community Association	157	3.27
Ridley Tari	Vanuatu National Party	123	2.56
Manuel Tari	People's Progressive Party	104	2.17
Garae Reynolds Toa	Independent	96	2.00
Willie Toa	Vanuatu Labour Party	39	0.81
Moffet Mele Biti	Vanuatu Republican Party	24	0.50
Total		4,797	100.00
Valid votes		4,797	98.30
Invalid/blank votes		83	1.70
Total votes		4,880	100.00
Registered voters/turnout		7,066	69.06

Ambrym
Candidate	Party	Votes	%
Jossie Masmas	Vanuatu Republican Party	618	17.23
Raphael Worwor	Union of Moderate Parties	515	14.36
Maki Simelum	Independent	485	13.52
Douglas Tangtang	People's Progressive Party	447	12.46
Job Sailas	Independent	313	8.73
Daniel Frank Tinning	Vanua'aku Pati	272	7.58
Bill Willie	Independent	262	7.30
George Bumseng	Independent	180	5.02
Elie Bonglibu	Union of Moderate Parties	158	4.40
Josiah Bakon	People's Action Party	157	4.38
Laurent Leingkone	Tomburin Kastom Movement	69	1.92
Elsie Lelon Savei	Muvment blong Chiefs	60	1.67
Williamson Naros	Vanuatu Labour Party	49	1.37
Robert Batick	Vanuatu Democratic Protection Party	2	0.06
Total		3,587	100.00
Valid votes		3,587	98.65
Invalid/blank votes		49	1.35
Total votes		3,636	100.00
Registered voters/turnout		4,775	76.15

Banks and Torres
Candidate	Party	Votes	%
Thomas Isom Sawon	National United Party	737	17.75
Dunstan Hilton	People's Progressive Party	654	15.75
Laliurou Eric Shedrac	National United Party	598	14.40
Jack Wona	Independent	534	12.86
Joseph Laloyer	Vanuatu National Party	484	11.66
Paul Kamey Demmet	People's Progressive Party	438	10.55
Reginold Stanley	Union of Moderate Parties	219	5.27
Sikir Sam Blondell	Independent	119	2.87
Basil Hopkins	Union Liberation Front	80	1.93
Christina Lorence	Vanua'aku Pati	79	1.90
Danstan Tula	Vanuatu Republican Party	63	1.52
Marau Frederick	Independent	61	1.47
David Leroux	Green Confederation	44	1.06
Victor Ron	People's Action Party	27	0.65
Lulum Vanva Derek	Melanesian Progressive Party	15	0.36
Total		4,152	100.00
Valid votes		4,152	99.24
Invalid/blank votes		32	0.76
Total votes		4,184	100.00
Registered voters/turnout		4,982	83.98

Efate
Candidate	Party	Votes	%
Joshua Kalsakau	Vanuatu Labour Party	1,381	11.55
Pakoa Kaltonga	Vanua'aku Pati	1,208	10.10
Alfred Rolland Carlot	Vanuatu Republican Party	959	8.02
Roro Sambo	National United Party	803	6.71
Nessam Kal J. Pierre Nudumuri	National Community Association	748	6.25
Steven Kalsakau	Union of Moderate Parties	735	6.15
Jimmy Luna Tasong	Vanuatu Republican Party	641	5.36
Barak Sopé	Melanesian Progressive Party	603	5.04
Norris Kalmet	Union blong Democratic Kastom Laef Movement	516	4.31
Jimmy Matai	Vanuatu National Party	460	3.85
James Kalosal	Green Confederation	373	3.12
Reuben Seru	Vanuatu Family First Party	287	2.40
Louis Carlo	Vanua'aku Pati	260	2.17
Michael Daniel	Vanua'aku Pati	247	2.07
Kalopa Kalpukai	Independent	195	1.63
Kalsong Harryman	Vanuatu Democratic Protection Party	192	1.61
David Walker	Vanuatu Democratic Protection Party	188	1.57
Johnson Jim Wabaiat	Tomburin Kastom Movement	180	1.51
Gilbert Memer Izono	Union of Moderate Parties	178	1.49
Robert Tasaruru	Independent	161	1.35
Ova Kalorongo	Independent	157	1.31
Jerry Daniel	Melanesian Progressive Party	152	1.27
Mark Bethel	Independent	149	1.25
Charlie Kalpoi Kalorus	Independent	139	1.16
Sope Malas	Green Confederation	122	1.02
Claude Kalsakau	Vanuatu National Party	115	0.96
Eddie Silas Tisaliu	Independent	104	0.87
Taiwia Rafei	Independent	86	0.72
Kalfau Esley	National United Party	85	0.71
Meles Kalosa	Muvment blong Chiefs	81	0.68
Martin Manses Atavroto	Independent	73	0.61
Bill K. Kalpoi	Independent	63	0.53
Joseph Malakai	People's Progressive Party	58	0.48
Joseph Obed	Independent	53	0.44
Amos Toufau	Vanuatu Family First Party	50	0.42
Peris Kalopong	Independent	40	0.33
Emil Mael	Tomburin Kastom Movement	38	0.32
Otto Norman	Independent	35	0.29
Sam Samson	Vanuatu Christian Party	30	0.25
Charley Tugon	Independent	15	0.13
Total		11,960	100.00
Valid votes		11,960	97.74
Invalid/blank votes		277	2.26
Total votes		12,237	100.00
Registered voters/turnout		21,178	57.78

Epi
Candidate	Party	Votes	%
Leinavao Tasso	Vanua'aku Pati	573	20.66
Issac Hamarliu	Vanuatu National Party	514	18.53
Isabelle Donald	Vanua'aku Pati	376	13.55
Jack Mowa	National United Party	357	12.87
Korah Benjimen	Independent	319	11.50
Tasso Philip	Vanuatu Republican Party	272	9.81
Keliu Oraka	Union of Moderate Parties	115	4.15
Sam Obed	Vanuatu Labour Party	79	2.85
Richard David Fadanumata	Shepherds Alliance	71	2.56
David Suma	Green Confederation	57	2.05
Ioane Simon	Independent	40	1.44
David Karie Tisanaripu	Melanesian Alliance	1	0.04
Total		2,774	100.00
Valid votes		2,774	98.58
Invalid/blank votes		40	1.42
Total votes		2,814	100.00
Registered voters/turnout		3,437	81.87

Luganville
Candidate	Party	Votes	%
George Wells	National United Party	1,148	20.63
Dominique Morin	Vanuatu Republican Party	708	12.72
Sam Toa	Independent	471	8.46
Roy Wilson	Vanuatu National Party	458	8.23
Temar Johnson	Union of Moderate Parties	360	6.47
Elder John Batick Bong	Independent	399	7.17
Jeremiah Vira	People's Action Party	334	6.00
Nathan Dick	Nagriamel	286	5.14
Gaspard Moli Palaud	Popular Movement	253	4.55
Ruth Moese	Independent	194	3.49
Raphael Yeoye	Vanuatu Family First Party	191	3.43
John Timothy	Green Confederation	151	2.71
John Morsen Willie	Vanua'aku Pati	149	2.68
Micah Mano	Melanesian Progressive Party	138	2.48
Camillo Sekeme	Vanuatu Democratic Protection Party	75	1.35
Avock Esau	Independent	66	1.19
George Meltek Rory	Muvment blong Chiefs	60	1.08
Paul Hakwa	People's Progressive Party	50	0.90
Pierre Malamlaen	Vanuatu Labour Party	48	0.86
Elizabeth Sihos	Independent	27	0.49
Total		5,566	100.00
Valid votes		5,566	98.90
Invalid/blank votes		62	1.10
Total votes		5,628	100.00
Registered voters/turnout		7,734	72.77

Maewo
Candidate	Party	Votes	%
Philip Boedoro	Vanua'aku Pati	664	39.41
Jonas Cullwick	National United Party	623	36.97
Santus Wari	Union of Moderate Parties	330	19.58
Jonah Toakanase	Nagriamel	68	4.04
Total		1,685	100.00
Valid votes		1,685	98.71
Invalid/blank votes		22	1.29
Total votes		1,707	100.00
Registered voters/turnout		2,124	80.37

Malekula
Candidate	Party	Votes	%
Esmon Saimon	Melanesian Progressive Party	799	5.90
Kisito Teilemb	Union of Moderate Parties	743	5.48
Eta Rory	Vanuatu Family First Party	730	5.39
Paul Telukluk	Namangi Aute	644	4.75
Don Ken Stephen	Independent	622	4.59
Sato Kilman	People's Progressive Party	606	4.47
Donna Browny	Vanuatu Republican Party	480	3.54
Pierre-Chanel Worwor	Vanuatu Republican Party	478	3.53
Charlie Rokrok	National United Party	474	3.50
Vital Tsiabon	Vanuatu Family First Party	468	3.45
Simeon Ennis	Green Confederation	427	3.15
Shetric Setrack	National United Party	416	3.07
Carl Patunvanu	Independent	403	2.97
Masing Alick	People's Progressive Party	358	2.64
Norbert Ngpan	Green Confederation	345	2.55
Alpi Baleng	Independent	342	2.52
Nelpar John Kith	National United Party	323	2.38
Tony Ata	Vanua'aku Pati	322	2.38
Sam Mahit	People's Progressive Party	317	2.34
Daniel Kute	Independent	308	2.27
Tom Andrew Nat-Naour	Independent	294	2.17
Johnety Jerety	Union of Moderate Parties	274	2.02
Jacob Thyna	Friend Melanesian Party	270	1.99
Jacob Frank	Vanua'aku Pati	262	1.93
Kalsay Kalmasay	National Community Association	251	1.85
Veremaito Billiam	Melanesian Progressive Party	246	1.82
Gaston Muluane	Namangi Aute	232	1.71
Paolo Lawac	Namangi Aute	223	1.65
Jeneck Patunvanu	Vanuatu National Party	220	1.62
Willie Mark	Independent	204	1.51
Jimmy Daniel Aptvanu	Independent	158	1.17
Fred William Tasso	Vanuatu Labour Party	147	1.08
Johnalsin Buktan	Independent	143	1.06
Obediah Kensi	Vanua'aku Pati	142	1.05
Timothy Maltock	Independent	137	1.01
Pechoux Meltetamat	Vanuatu Democratic Protection Party	126	0.93
Marie Pascale Meleoune	Independent	100	0.74
Willie Apia Masing	Independent	89	0.66
Ronnie Jacobus	Melanesian Alliance	69	0.51
John Ammil	Independent	68	0.50
Zilo Bong Fanteng	Independent	62	0.46
Raymond Atin	Independent	59	0.44
David Willion	Vanuatu Democratic Protection Party	51	0.38
Albert Muna	Independent	51	0.38
Raoul Nemtenmal	Nagriamel	30	0.22
Olivier Fidelio	Muvment blong Chiefs	29	0.21
Enbue Lenneth	United Liberation Front	7	0.05
Total		13,549	100.00
Valid votes		13,549	98.97
Invalid/blank votes		141	1.03
Total votes		13,690	100.00
Registered voters/turnout		17,655	77.54

Malo–Aore
Candidate	Party	Votes	%
Havo Molisale	Nagriamel	546	23.42
Nikenike Vurobaravu	Vanua'aku Pati	541	23.21
Josias Moli	Vanuatu Republican Party	410	17.59
Sano Alvea	Independent	338	14.50
Vula Livo	Union of Moderate Parties	330	14.16
Juliet Sumbe	Muvment blong Chiefs	87	3.73
Mele Ravo	Namangi Aute	79	3.39
Total		2,331	100.00
Valid votes		2,331	98.48
Invalid/blank votes		36	1.52
Total votes		2,367	100.00
Registered voters/turnout		2,910	81.34

Other Southern Islands
Candidate	Party	Votes	%
Ture Kailo	Vanua'aku Pati	816	42.95
Thomas Nentu	Independent	319	16.79
Masel Wilson Manua	National United Party	304	16.00
James Silas	Vanuatu Labour Party	192	10.11
John Mete Apei	National Community Association	112	5.89
Helen Stela Naupa	Melanesian Alliance	81	4.26
James Yaviong	People's Progressive Party	76	4.00
Total		1,900	100.00
Valid votes		1,900	98.34
Invalid/blank votes		32	1.66
Total votes		1,932	100.00
Registered voters/turnout		2,329	82.95

Paama
Candidate	Party	Votes	%
David Areasuv	People's Progressive Party	338	41.07
Sam Dan Avock	Vanua'aku Pati	287	34.87
Demis Lago	Melanesian Progressive Party	89	10.81
Tom Bethuel Mail	National United Party	64	7.78
Tomat Vativolivol Alibet	Union of Moderate Parties	44	5.35
Mahitatan Avock	Independent	1	0.12
Gideon Mael	Green Confederation	0	0.00
Total		823	100.00
Valid votes		823	99.04
Invalid/blank votes		8	0.96
Total votes		831	100.00
Registered voters/turnout		928	89.55

Pentecost
Candidate	Party	Votes	%
Charlot Salwai	Union of Moderate Parties	1,023	14.35
Ham Lini	National United Party	726	10.19
David Tosul	National United Party	569	7.98
Bruce Asal	Union of Moderate Parties	560	7.86
Tony Nari	Vanua'aku Pati	445	6.24
Godfrey Buleur	National United Party	443	6.21
Gildas Tabianga	National United Party	442	6.20
Noel Tamata Mala	People's Progressive Party	313	4.39
Ezekiel Bule	Vanuatu Labour Party	260	3.65
Lazare Asal	Vanuatu Republican Party	236	3.31
David Alberto Huri	Independent	231	3.24
Hilario Rebu	Nagriamel	223	3.13
Norbert Sumsum	Vanuatu Democratic Protection Party	220	3.09
Joseph Tariodo	Green Confederation	217	3.04
Silas Aru	Independent	217	3.04
Mark Danol	Independent	194	2.72
Sylvester Bulesa	Independent	187	2.62
Telkon Bebe	People's Action Party	143	2.01
Joseph Tabirap	Independent	123	1.73
Gratien Moisoul	Muvment blong Chiefs	115	1.61
Luc Siba	Vanuatu Christian Party	75	1.05
Witnol Bule	National Community Association	51	0.72
Jonathan Siro	Independent	46	0.65
Edward Rau	Reassemble the Union Movement for the People of Vanuatu	45	0.63
Winston Wisly Tabi	Independent	14	0.20
Joram Tugu	Vanuatu Democratic Protection Party	10	0.14
Total		7,128	100.00
Valid votes		7,128	98.56
Invalid/blank votes		104	1.44
Total votes		7,232	100.00
Registered voters/turnout		10,538	68.63

Port Vila
Candidate	Party	Votes	%
Ralph Regenvanu	Independent	1,710	10.83
Moana Carcasses Kalosil	Green Confederation	1,086	6.88
Edward Natapei	Vanua'aku Pati	929	5.88
Maxime Carlot Korman	Vanuatu Republican Party	846	5.36
Abel David	Shepherds Alliance	829	5.25
Patrick Crowby	National United Party	787	4.99
Ephraim Kalsakau	Vanuatu Labour Party	774	4.90
Paul Avock Hungai	Vanua'aku Pati	661	4.19
Willie Jimmy	National United Party	616	3.90
Pierre Tor	Independent	559	3.54
Tanarango Solo	National Community Association	549	3.48
Henri Taga Tarikarea	Union of Moderate Parties	467	2.96
Ambrosio Melteres	Union of Moderate Parties	467	2.96
Molbah Hilaire Bule	Independent	338	2.14
Isabelle Bani	Vanuatu Family First Party	337	2.13
Georgio Calo	Union of Moderate Parties	312	1.98
Daniel Ronnie	Independent	305	1.93
Dinh Van Than	Vanuatu National Party	298	1.89
Taripoa Kalfabun	Melanesian Progressive Party	297	1.88
Silas Charles Hakwa	People's Action Party	256	1.62
Nato Taiwia	Melanesian Progressive Party	250	1.58
John Luen Tarinuamata	Reassemble the Union Movement for the People of Vanuatu	241	1.53
Henry Maximo	People's Progressive Party	222	1.41
Christophe Leye	Independent	218	1.38
Bob Kuao	Reassemble the Union Movement for the People of Vanuatu	213	1.35
Moses Stevens	Vanuatu Christian Party	198	1.25
Jay Ngwele	Independent	195	1.24
Robinson Rono	Independent	193	1.22
Michael Sarea Kalsakau	Independent	178	1.13
Malachai Sakou	Independent	162	1.03
Mike Bakeoliu	Independent	152	0.96
Ann Karie	Independent	148	0.94
Albert Iokai	Independent	147	0.93
Marco Herrominly	Muvment blong Chiefs	101	0.64
Tety Cyrus	Independent	99	0.63
Nibtik Markson	Shepherds Alliance	78	0.49
Abie Jack Marikembo	Union blong Democratic Kastom Laef Movement	78	0.49
Daniel Toara Kokona	Independent	78	0.49
Cyriaque Melep	Nagriamel	76	0.48
Keinoho Hosea	Vanuatu Democratic Protection Party	51	0.32
Jimmy Andeng	Tomburin Kastom Movement	43	0.27
Linda Kalpoi	Muvment blong Chiefs	34	0.22
Kasso Willie	Reassemble the Union Movement for the People of Vanuatu	33	0.21
Wendy Himford	Christian Democratic Party	32	0.20
Tom Kasso Taley	Reassemble the Union Movement for the People of Vanuatu	31	0.20
Paul Bila	Vanuatu Democratic Protection Party	28	0.18
Harry Collins	Independent	23	0.15
Hendon Kalsakau	Vanuatu Democratic Protection Party	16	0.10
Joe Nocklam	Union blong Democratic Kastom Laef Movement	16	0.10
Iarawoi Rezel Samana	Independent	16	0.10
Manina Packete	Muvment blong Chiefs	14	0.09
Total		15,787	100.00
Valid votes		15,787	98.71
Invalid/blank votes		207	1.29
Total votes		15,994	100.00
Registered voters/turnout		22,308	71.70

Santo
Candidate	Party	Votes	%
Samson Samsen	Vanuatu Republican Party	1,159	8.67
Serge Vohor	Union of Moderate Parties	946	7.08
Solomon Lorin	Union of Moderate Parties	888	6.65
Jean Ravou Akii Kolomule	Vanuatu Progressive Republican Farmers Party	837	6.26
Marcellino Pipite	Vanuatu Republican Party	659	4.93
Voiasusu Tae	Union of Moderate Parties	589	4.41
Sela Molisa	Vanua'aku Pati	548	4.10
Christion Maliu	Union of Moderate Parties	529	3.96
John Lum	Nagriamel	517	3.87
Philip Andikar	Independent	498	3.73
Moliare Vatout	Independent	495	3.70
Shem Kalo	Independent	495	3.70
John Tari Molbarav	Vanuatu National Party	492	3.68
Sandie Iacvuth	National United Party	462	3.46
Warssal Leon Katty	Nagriamel	462	3.46
Livo Salerua	Vanua'aku Pati	456	3.41
Vanua Mele	Vanuatu Liberal Party	391	2.93
Akisina Maliu	Independent	308	2.31
Loy Saul	Muvment blong Chiefs	294	2.20
Andiron Andi Farfar	Independent	254	1.90
Varucu Paialoloso	Muvment blong Chiefs	245	1.83
John Noel	Independent	239	1.79
Norman Kandy	National United Party	233	1.74
Jimmy Nakato Stevens	Nagriamel	232	1.74
Tavi Mele	Independent	217	1.62
Moses Wyne	National United Party	199	1.49
Allan Pama	Independent	167	1.25
Raja Lui	Green Confederation	152	1.14
Ninisia Karaivatu	Melanesian Progressive Party	151	1.13
Mara William Reur	Vanuatu Family First Party	95	0.71
Lestar James	People's Action Party	56	0.42
John Walker Rii	People's Action Party	44	0.33
Tining Jackson	Muvment blong Chiefs	39	0.29
Jimmys Imbert	Independent	14	0.10
Total		13,362	100.00
Valid votes		13,362	99.01
Invalid/blank votes		134	0.99
Total votes		13,496	100.00
Registered voters/turnout		19,934	67.70

Shepherds
Candidate	Party	Votes	%
Daniel Kalo Toara	Green Confederation	298	38.80
Baptiste Firiam Maripu	Vanua'aku Pati	207	26.95
Robert B. Samuel	People's Progressive Party	122	15.89
Morris Amos	Vanuatu National Party	106	13.80
Joel Matariki	National United Party	34	4.43
Jean William Marimarae	Union of Moderate Parties	1	0.13
Total		768	100.00
Valid votes		768	98.84
Invalid/blank votes		9	1.16
Total votes		777	100.00
Registered voters/turnout		907	85.67

Tanna
Candidate	Party	Votes	%
Harry Iauko	Vanua'aku Pati	1,662	12.09
Joe Natuman	Vanua'aku Pati	992	7.21
Bob Loughman	Vanua'aku Pati	955	6.94
Moses Kahu	Vanua'aku Pati	908	6.60
Morking Stevens	National United Party	855	6.22
Isaac Judah	Independent	822	5.98
Louis Etap	Independent	569	4.14
Willie Lop	People's Progressive Party	514	3.74
Keasipai Song	Union of Moderate Parties	482	3.50
Charley Nako	Independent	477	3.47
Collin Natonga	National Community Association	463	3.37
Kelson Hosea	Union of Moderate Parties	458	3.33
Steven Iapum Natuka	Independent	414	3.01
Samuel Pusai	Independent	406	2.95
Joel Kamtop Lop	Independent	368	2.68
Willie Posen	Independent	347	2.52
Thomas Iaru	Independent	322	2.34
Gilbert Norman	Union of Moderate Parties	276	2.01
Jack Iauko	People's Progressive Party	246	1.79
Tom Ierongen Ienumaku	Vanua'aku Pati	245	1.78
Less John Napuati	Vanuatu National Party	211	1.53
Simon Kaukare	Muvment blong Chiefs	193	1.40
Kawai J. Thompson	Vanuatu Republican Party	184	1.34
Raymond Michel	Independent	184	1.34
Walter Kota	Vanuatu Family First Party	178	1.29
Isaac Wan	Green Confederation	172	1.25
Jonah Tagapu	People's Progressive Party	164	1.19
Jack Kapum	Muvment blong Chiefs	158	1.15
Peter Jeremiah Niamak	Independent	147	1.07
Jeffrey Lauha	Melanesian Progressive Party	106	0.77
Jimmy Tom Lume	National Community Association	106	0.77
Joseph Niel Yeba	Vanuatu Labour Party	89	0.65
Makam Lough	Independent	52	0.38
James Nimanpen	Independent	20	0.15
Sam Lop	Vanuatu Democratic Protection Party	7	0.05
Total		13,752	100.00
Valid votes		13,752	98.24
Invalid/blank votes		247	1.76
Total votes		13,999	100.00
Registered voters/turnout		21,500	65.11

Tongoa
Candidate	Party	Votes	%
Willie Ruben Abel Titongoa	Vanua'aku Pati	488	38.24
Nicole Jimmy	Vanuatu Republican Party	418	32.76
Tom Seule	National United Party	275	21.55
Maala Haruel Roy	Union of Moderate Parties	61	4.78
Lesly Peter Tapangator	Shepherds Alliance	34	2.66
Total		1,276	100.00
Valid votes		1,276	98.31
Invalid/blank votes		22	1.69
Total votes		1,298	100.00
Registered voters/turnout		1,738	74.68

== Subsequent by-elections ==
- 2009 Vanuatuan by-elections, in Efate, Epi, Southern Islands, and Tanna.

== Analysis ==
Derek Brien, of the Pacific Policy Institute of Public Policy in Port Vila, made the following comment on the election:

"In effect we've had two elections here in Vanuatu. We've got the election here in town, Port Vila, and Efate, the island on which it's situated, and then the rest of the country where 80 per cent of the population lives. And I say that because in the lead up to the election a lot of the media, a lot of the analysts were predicting a mood for change. I think what we forgot in that debate, or in that discussion in the lead up to the election, what was the rest of the country talking about. The rural areas where the majority of people don't have access to newspapers, televisions and, in the last few years, radio because there's been a problem with the transmitter. And in a lot of cases the rural electorate has been totally disengaged from both the government process and certainly the political process. It's not about policy basis down there. It's about patronage. It's about personalities."

== See also ==
- List of members of the Parliament of Vanuatu (2008–2012)
