= List of members of the Parliament of Vanuatu (1998–2002) =

The 52 members of the Parliament of Vanuatu from 1998 to 2002 were elected on 6 March 1998.

== List of members ==
Constituency	Member	Party	Notes
Ambae	James Bule	National United Party	
Ambae	Silas Hakwa	Vanua'aku Pati	
Ambae	Jacques Sese	Union of Moderate Parties	
Ambrym	Daniel Bongtor	Vanua'aku Pati	
Ambrym	Irene Bongnaim	Union of Moderate Parties	
Banks and Torres	Stanley Reginold	National United Party	
Banks and Torres	Barnabas Wilson	National United Party	
Efate	Joe Calo	Vanua'aku Pati	
Efate	Donald Kalpokas	Vanua'aku Pati	
Efate	Foster Rakom	Vanua'aku Pati	
Efate	Barak Sopé	Melanesian Progressive Party	
Epi	Kila Lemaya	Union of Moderate Parties	Died in July 1999. Kora Maki (UMP) won the subsequent by-election on 31 August 1999
Epi	Willie Varasmite	Vanua'aku Pati	
Luganville	Annas Tinwaku	National United Party	Replaced by Leo Tamata (NUP) in a by-election on 7 February 2001
Luganville	George Wells	Vanua'aku Pati	
Maewo	Paul Tari	National United Party	
Malekula	Esmon Saimon	Melanesian Progressive Party	
Malekula	Sato Kilman	Melanesian Progressive Party	
Malekula	Josiah Merifar	National United Party	Replaced by Litoung Aniceto (NUP) in a by-election on 7 February 2001
Malekula	John Morrisen	Vanua'aku Pati	
Malekula	Paul Telukluk	Union of Moderate Parties	
Malekula	Jacob Thyna	Melanesian Progressive Party	
Malekula	Jackleen Ruben Titek	Independent	
Malo–Aore	Josias Moli	Union of Moderate Parties	Election result annulled on 11 October 1998. Moli won the subsequent by-election on 31 August 1999
Other Southern Island	Allen Nafuki	Vanua'aku Pati	
Paama	Sam Avok	Vanua'aku Pati	
Pentecost	Vincent Boulekone	Union of Moderate Parties	
Pentecost	Walter Lini	National United Party	Died in February 1999. Ham Lin̄i (NUP) won the subsequent by-election on 31 August 1999
Pentecost	Barnabas Tabi	National United Party	
Pentecost	Jonas Tabi	National United Party	
Port Vila	Maxime Carlot Korman	Vanuatu Republican Party	
Port Vila	Willie Jimmy	Union of Moderate Parties	
Port Vila	Clement Leo	Vanua'aku Pati	
Port Vila	Henry Karea	Union of Moderate Parties	
Port Vila	Edward Natapei	Vanua'aku Pati	
Port Vila	Wilson Rayaru	Vanua'aku Pati	
Santo	Jimmy Imbert	Union of Moderate Parties	
Santo	Jean-Alain Mahe	Union of Moderate Parties	
Santo	Sela Molisa	Vanua'aku Pati	
Santo	Iercet Pasvu	Vanua'aku Pati	
Santo	Molibaraf Tari	National United Party	
Santo	Albert Ravutia	Melanesian Progressive Party	
Santo	Serge Vohor	Union of Moderate Parties	
Shepherds	Amos Titongoa	Vanua'aku Pati	
Tanna	Henry Iauko	Melanesian Progressive Party	
Tanna	Steven Morking	Independent	
Tanna	Joe Natuman	Vanua'aku Pati	
Tanna	Iarris Naunun	John Frum Movement	
Tanna	Jimmy Nicklam	Vanua'aku Pati	
Tanna	Willy Posen	Union of Moderate Parties	
Tanna	Keasipai Song	John Frum Movement	
Tongoa	John Alick Robert	National United Party	Election result annulled on 2 March 1999. Robert won the subsequent by-election on 31 August 1999
Source: Official Gazette
