= 2004 Vanuatuan general election =

General election held in Vanuatu

- 6 July 2004
- All 52 seats in Parliament; 26 seats needed for a majority
Party	Leader	Vote %	Seats	+/–
NUP	Ham Lin̄i	10.21	10	+2
Vanua'aku	Edward Natapei	13.90	8	−6
UMP	Serge Vohor	15.02	8	−7
PPP	Sato Kilman	4.73	4	+3
Republican	Maxime Carlot Korman	5.09	4	+1
MMP	Barak Sopé	5.38	3	0
Green	Amos Andeng	7.67	3	+1
NCA	Sabi Natonga	2.59	2	+2
PAP	Peter Vuta	2.45	1	New
Namangi Aute	Paul Telukluk	0.77	1	0
Independents	—	21.97	8	+3
This lists parties that won seats. See the complete results below.
Results by constituency
Prime Minister before	Subsequent Prime Minister
Edward Natapei; Vanua'aku	Edward Natapei; UMP

General elections were held in Vanuatu on 6 July 2004. The Vanua'aku Pati–Vanuatu National United Party coalition won the most seats, but failed to gain a majority, which instead was cobbled together by Serge Vohor of the Union of Moderate Parties, who became Prime Minister, subsequently forming a national unity government.

However, after disagreements over establishing relations with Taiwan, he was removed from office by a motion of no confidence and replaced by the Vanuatu National United Party's Ham Lin̄i.

Nine women candidates took part in the election. Two were elected.

== Results ==
Party	Votes	%	Seats	+/–
Union of Moderate Parties	13,852	15.02	8	–7
Vanua'aku Pati	12,819	13.90	8	–6
National United Party	9,418	10.21	10	+2
Green Confederation	7,075	7.67	3	+1
Melanesian Progressive Party	4,961	5.38	3	0
Vanuatu Republican Party	4,695	5.09	4	+1
People's Progressive Party	4,362	4.73	4	+3
Vanuatu National Party	4,001	4.34	0	New
National Community Association	2,385	2.59	2	+2
People's Action Party	2,263	2.45	1	New
Vanua K Group	1,650	1.79	0	New
Vanuatu Labour Party	1,319	1.43	0	New
Friend Melanesian Party	1,101	1.19	0	–1
Natatok	744	0.81	0	New
Namangi Aute	707	0.77	1	0
Nagriamel	405	0.44	0	0
John Frum Movement	230	0.25	0	New
Independents	20,265	21.97	8	+3
Total	92,252	100.00	52	0
Registered voters/turnout	133,497	–		
Source: Official Gazette

=== By constituency ===
Ambae
Candidate	Party	Votes	%
James Bule	National United Party	1,057	23.08
Dickinson Vusilai	Independent	1,001	21.86
Peter Vuta	People's Action Party	954	20.83
Wilson Aru	Vanua'aku Pati	648	14.15
Jacques Sésé	Union of Moderate Parties	419	9.15
Samson Bue	Union of Moderate Parties	357	7.80
John Tariweu M. Wari	Independent	96	2.10
Samuel Bani	Vanuatu Republican Party	47	1.03
Total		4,579	100.00
Valid votes		4,579	98.35
Invalid/blank votes		77	1.65
Total votes		4,656	100.00
Registered voters/turnout		6,700	69.49

Ambrym
Candidate	Party	Votes	%
Raphael Worwor	Union of Moderate Parties	588	16.47
Jossie Masmas	Vanuatu Republican Party	574	16.08
Roger Abiut	Green Confederation	513	14.37
Jacob Nabong	Vanua'aku Pati	456	12.77
Luke Daniel Simelum	Melanesian Progressive Party	387	10.84
Edwin Wuan	Independent	339	9.50
John Josiah	People's Action Party	311	8.71
Ellie Robert Bonglibu	Vanuatu National Party	196	5.49
Andrew Welwel	People's Progressive Party	115	3.22
William Ken	Vanuatu Labour Party	91	2.55
Total		3,570	100.00
Valid votes		3,570	97.78
Invalid/blank votes		81	2.22
Total votes		3,651	100.00
Registered voters/turnout		4,874	74.91

Banks and Torres
Candidate	Party	Votes	%
Dunstan Hilton	People's Progressive Party	904	23.80
Laliurou Eric Shedrac	National United Party	770	20.27
Paul K. Demmet	Independent	514	13.53
Charles Bice	National United Party	373	9.82
Nicholas Brown	Vanua'aku Pati	279	7.35
Harold Nice	Vanua K Group	198	5.21
Ezekiel W. Anthny	Vanuatu Republican Party	186	4.90
David Wesaror	Green Confederation	182	4.79
Stanlee Reginald	Union of Moderate Parties	160	4.21
Reynold Sale	Independent	129	3.40
Clifton Lonsdale	Independent	52	1.37
Norman Roslyn	Independent	51	1.34
Total		3,798	100.00
Valid votes		3,798	98.06
Invalid/blank votes		75	1.94
Total votes		3,873	100.00
Registered voters/turnout		4,681	82.74

Efate
Candidate	Party	Votes	%
Steven Kalsakau	Union of Moderate Parties	987	10.17
Joshua Kalsakau	National Community Association	978	10.08
Barak Sopé	Melanesian Progressive Party	970	9.99
Roro Sambo	Green Confederation	756	7.79
Alfred Rolland Carlot	Natatok	744	7.67
Kalman Kaltoi	Vanuatu National Party	692	7.13
Donald Kalpokas	Vanua'aku Pati	683	7.04
Soka Edwin Malas	Independent	576	5.94
Jimmy Luna Tasong	Vanuatu Republican Party	510	5.26
Kalchichi Malas	Vanuatu Labour Party	396	4.08
Kali Kalchiare Vatoko	Independent	366	3.77
Chilia Jimmy Meto	National United Party	338	3.48
Charlie Kalorus Kalpoi	Independent	335	3.45
Jack Norris Kalmet	People's Progressive Party	314	3.24
Robert Tasaruru	Vanua'aku Pati	309	3.18
Joe Bomal Carlo	Vanua'aku Pati	254	2.62
Belleay Kalotiti	Independent	208	2.14
Claude Kalsakau	Independent	179	1.84
David T. Tanarango	Independent	110	1.13
Total		9,705	100.00
Valid votes		9,705	98.45
Invalid/blank votes		153	1.55
Total votes		9,858	100.00
Registered voters/turnout		15,460	63.76

Epi
Candidate	Party	Votes	%
Leinavao Tasso	Independent	403	16.57
Isabelle Donald	Vanua'aku Pati	378	15.54
Alick Aram	Independent	364	14.97
Patrick Sarginson	Green Confederation	296	12.17
Billy Raymond	Vanuatu Republican Party	264	10.86
Apia Renzo Valia	Independent	234	9.62
Willie Mese	Union of Moderate Parties	185	7.61
Luwi Song	National United Party	136	5.59
Willi Olli Varasmaite	Independent	129	5.30
Samuel Taritonga	Melanesian Progressive Party	43	1.77
Total		2,432	100.00
Valid votes		2,432	97.87
Invalid/blank votes		53	2.13
Total votes		2,485	100.00
Registered voters/turnout		3,044	81.64

Luganville
Candidate	Party	Votes	%
George Wells	Vanua'aku Pati	1,017	23.90
Eric Jack	National United Party	520	12.22
James Wango	People's Action Party	491	11.54
Baba Francois Luc	Union of Moderate Parties	436	10.24
Buletare Prosper	Independent	362	8.51
Emboi Morris	Green Confederation	322	7.57
Joe Naura	Melanesian Progressive Party	280	6.58
George Fai	Independent	238	5.59
Donald Restuetune	Independent	200	4.70
Edwin Aprimen	Vanuatu Republican Party	125	2.94
Michael Kalmet	Independent	118	2.77
Manina Packete	Vanuatu National Party	100	2.35
Harry Avia	Vanua K Group	47	1.10
Total		4,256	100.00
Valid votes		4,256	97.01
Invalid/blank votes		131	2.99
Total votes		4,387	100.00
Registered voters/turnout		8,947	49.03

Maewo
Candidate	Party	Votes	%
Philip Boedoro	Vanua'aku Pati	551	39.75
Paul Ren Tari	National United Party	376	27.13
Gregory Taranban	Union of Moderate Parties	271	19.55
Swithin Adin	Green Confederation	188	13.56
Total		1,386	100.00
Valid votes		1,386	95.59
Invalid/blank votes		64	4.41
Total votes		1,450	100.00
Registered voters/turnout		1,832	79.15

Malekula
Candidate	Party	Votes	%
Sato Kilman	People's Progressive Party	1,072	8.50
Donna Browny	Vanuatu Republican Party	960	7.61
Paul Telukluk	Namangi Aute	707	5.60
Malon Hospmander	People's Progressive Party	660	5.23
Esmon Saimon	Melanesian Progressive Party	613	4.86
Caleb Isaac	Independent	597	4.73
Charlie Rokrok	National United Party	548	4.34
Jacob Thyna	Friend Melanesian Party	528	4.18
Janeck Patunvanu	Vanuatu National Party	520	4.12
Sam Noel	Union of Moderate Parties	516	4.09
Alick Masing	Union of Moderate Parties	496	3.93
Jackleen Ruben Titek	Vanua'aku Pati	495	3.92
Willie John Morrison	Vanua'aku Pati	487	3.86
Japeth Mali Nawilau	Independent	465	3.68
Antonin Vebong	Green Confederation	440	3.49
Don Ken	Independent	414	3.28
Rory Albano	Green Confederation	396	3.14
Sethy Rapsarey Kalnaran	Melanesian Progressive Party	355	2.81
Mathieu Tulili	Independent	315	2.50
Androng Manjab	Independent	313	2.48
Maxwell Malto	Vanuatu Labour Party	305	2.42
Norbert Ngpan	Independent	297	2.35
Teilemb Kisito	Independent	230	1.82
Michel Maurice	Green Confederation	233	1.85
Johnson Kalo	Independent	222	1.76
Pechou Meltetamat	Vanua K Group	203	1.61
Andre Marcel	Independent	185	1.47
Seth Matvungkeres	Vanuatu National Party	47	0.37
Total		12,619	100.00
Valid votes		12,619	98.38
Invalid/blank votes		208	1.62
Total votes		12,827	100.00
Registered voters/turnout		16,391	78.26

Malo–Aore
Candidate	Party	Votes	%
Josias Moli	Union of Moderate Parties	753	33.39
Leo Tamata	Vanua'aku Pati	517	22.93
Havo Molisale	Independent	426	18.89
Sano Alvea	Melanesian Progressive Party	331	14.68
Ken Mansi	Independent	117	5.19
Sive Song	People's Progressive Party	111	4.92
Total		2,255	100.00
Valid votes		2,255	97.58
Invalid/blank votes		56	2.42
Total votes		2,311	100.00
Registered voters/turnout		2,777	83.22

Other Southern Islands
Candidate	Party	Votes	%
Thomas Nentu	Melanesian Progressive Party	544	32.32
Thomas Namusi Niditauae	Vanua'aku Pati	506	30.07
David Theodore	Union of Moderate Parties	256	15.21
Philip Charlie Norwo	Independent	194	11.53
Allen Nafuki	Vanua K Group	183	10.87
Total		1,683	100.00
Registered voters/turnout		2,074	–

Paama
Candidate	Party	Votes	%
Sam Dan Avok	Vanua'aku Pati	349	42.72
David Willie Tien	Melanesian Progressive Party	324	39.66
Demis Lango	Independent	73	8.94
Abel Tomatvativol Luwi	Union of Moderate Parties	37	4.53
Tom Maki Weiwo	Vanua K Group	34	4.16
Total		817	100.00
Valid votes		817	93.91
Invalid/blank votes		53	6.09
Total votes		870	100.00
Registered voters/turnout		965	90.16

Pentecost
Candidate	Party	Votes	%
Ham Lini	National United Party	956	13.89
Charlot Salwai	Union of Moderate Parties	736	10.69
David Tosul	National United Party	641	9.31
Noel Tamata	People's Progressive Party	522	7.58
Luke F. Warry	Union of Moderate Parties	520	7.55
Gaetano Bulewak	Green Confederation	514	7.47
Richard Kaentoh Tab	Vanua'aku Pati	443	6.44
Ezekiel Bule	Melanesian Progressive Party	376	5.46
Michel Buleman	Vanuatu Republican Party	339	4.93
John Hari Leo	National United Party	329	4.78
Wilfred Tabino	Independent	295	4.29
Benedick Boulekone	Vanuatu National Party	288	4.18
Salathiel Tabi	National United Party	249	3.62
Raphael Leo	Vanuatu National Party	249	3.62
Michael Ture	Independent	168	2.44
Frazer Sine	Independent	118	1.71
Graim Takasum	Vanuatu National Party	87	1.26
Tariroroi Philip Gihiala	Independent	29	0.42
John Tarisine	Independent	24	0.35
Total		6,883	100.00
Valid votes		6,883	97.41
Invalid/blank votes		183	2.59
Total votes		7,066	100.00
Registered voters/turnout		9,947	71.04

Port Vila
Candidate	Party	Votes	%
Edward Natapei	Vanua'aku Pati	950	7.94
Pierre Tore	Independent	932	7.79
Maxime Carlot Korman	Vanuatu Republican Party	803	6.71
Henri Taga	Union of Moderate Parties	796	6.65
Moana Carcasses Kalosil	Green Confederation	782	6.54
Willie Jimmy	National United Party	738	6.17
Avock Paul Hunga	Vanuatu National Party	626	5.23
Alick George Noel	Union of Moderate Parties	613	5.12
Dinh Van Than	Vanuatu National Party	538	4.50
Ephraim Kalsakau	Vanuatu Labour Party	527	4.41
Paul Ben Mariwot	Independent	437	3.65
Nato Taiwia	Melanesian Progressive Party	392	3.28
Job Dalesa	Vanua'aku Pati	353	2.95
Elizabeth Qualau	People's Action Party	347	2.90
Abel Louis	Union of Moderate Parties	320	2.67
Yoan Mariasua	Vanua K Group	318	2.66
Natonga Colin	National Community Association	302	2.52
Joseph Joel	Independent	255	2.13
Eric Pakoa Marakiwola	Independent	223	1.86
Reuben Rex	Independent	223	1.86
Abi Jack Marikempo	Independent	188	1.57
Alfred Baniuri	People's Progressive Party	181	1.51
Wendy Himford	Independent	176	1.47
Hilda Lini	Independent	170	1.42
Peter Sali Souvai	Independent	156	1.30
Clement Leo	Vanua K Group	116	0.97
John Path	Vanua K Group	95	0.79
Harry Klafer Fantaly	Independent	76	0.64
Christian Gau Sau Wilson	Vanua K Group	58	0.48
Blandine Bulekon	Independent	56	0.47
Cyriaque Mele	Independent	49	0.41
Basil Hopkins	Independent	49	0.41
Hendon Kalsakau	Independent	47	0.39
Ruth Dovo	Independent	45	0.38
Guillaume Leingkone	Independent	26	0.22
Total		11,963	100.00
Valid votes		11,963	98.62
Invalid/blank votes		167	1.38
Total votes		12,130	100.00
Registered voters/turnout		18,970	63.94

Santo
Candidate	Party	Votes	%
Arnold Prasad	Green Confederation	1,201	10.51
Serge Vohor	Union of Moderate Parties	1,143	10.00
John Lum	Independent	900	7.87
Sela Molisa	Vanua'aku Pati	713	6.24
Philip Andikar	Independent	704	6.16
Sandie Iavcuth	National United Party	689	6.03
Marcellino Pipite	Vanuatu Republican Party	678	5.93
Jean Ravou Aku Komoule	Independent	586	5.13
Albert Ravutia	Friend Melanesian Party	573	5.01
John Tari Molibaraf	Vanuatu National Party	509	4.45
Frank Tom Sokarai	Vanua'aku Pati	434	3.80
Denis Philip	Union of Moderate Parties	431	3.77
Shem Kalo	National United Party	427	3.74
John Noel	Vanua'aku Pati	403	3.53
Franky Moli Stevens	Nagriamel	333	2.91
Remy Vatambe	Melanesian Progressive Party	321	2.81
Imbert Jimmys	Union of Moderate Parties	288	2.52
Jean-Alain Mahé	Union of Moderate Parties	278	2.43
Sylverio Takataveti	Independent	199	1.74
Jimmy Nakato Stevens	Independent	165	1.44
Tony Naliupis	People's Action Party	160	1.40
Edmond Hajuju	Vanuatu National Party	149	1.30
Ben Rovu	Independent	74	0.65
Yersel Joris Paul	Nagriamel	72	0.63
Total		11,430	100.00
Valid votes		11,430	97.90
Invalid/blank votes		245	2.10
Total votes		11,675	100.00
Registered voters/turnout		15,999	72.97

Shepherds
Candidate	Party	Votes	%
Toara Daniel	Union of Moderate Parties	541	57.37
Shem Claude Masorangi	Vanua'aku Pati	253	26.83
Robert B. Samuel	People's Progressive Party	126	13.36
Obed Roy	Independent	23	2.44
Total		943	100.00
Valid votes		943	97.12
Invalid/blank votes		28	2.88
Total votes		971	100.00
Registered voters/turnout		1,103	88.03

Tanna
Candidate	Party	Votes	%
Louis Etap	Independent	965	7.57
Joe Natuman	Vanua'aku Pati	872	6.84
Morkin Steven	National United Party	813	6.38
Bob Loughman	Independent	781	6.12
Keasipai Song	National Community Association	773	6.06
Isaac Judah	Union of Moderate Parties	765	6.00
Moses Kahu	Vanua'aku Pati	701	5.50
Isaac Nauka	Green Confederation	686	5.38
Posen Willie	Union of Moderate Parties	685	5.37
Martin Iapatu	Union of Moderate Parties	619	4.85
Jimmy Nicklam	Vanua'aku Pati	543	4.26
Francois Koapa	Union of Moderate Parties	491	3.85
Gedion Nampas	Independent	477	3.74
Samuel Pusai	Independent	436	3.42
Andrew Namhat Kausiama	Vanua K Group	398	3.12
Tom Nipiau	People's Progressive Party	357	2.80
Harris Naunun	Green Confederation	356	2.79
Kapalu Saupat	National Community Association	332	2.60
Mickael Nalao	Independent	304	2.38
Simon Kaukar	Independent	238	1.87
Joel Mila Joseph	John Frum Movement	230	1.80
Yawah Tom Leong	Green Confederation	210	1.65
Willie Lop	Vanuatu Republican Party	209	1.64
Kaso Inam	Independent	207	1.62
Hosea Jack Kangaru	Independent	193	1.51
Henry Naieu	Independent	82	0.64
Henry Iauko	Melanesian Progressive Party	25	0.20
Pita Etap	Independent	4	0.03
Total		12,752	100.00
Registered voters/turnout		17,985	–

Tongoa
Candidate	Party	Votes	%
Tom Seule	National United Party	458	38.78
Peter Morris	Independent	229	19.39
Willie Rueben Titongoa	Vanua'aku Pati	225	19.05
Edward Kalo Toara	Union of Moderate Parties	165	13.97
John Mark Bell	Independent	104	8.81
Total		1,181	100.00
Valid votes		1,181	97.04
Invalid/blank votes		36	2.96
Total votes		1,217	100.00
Registered voters/turnout		1,748	69.62

== See also ==
- List of members of the Parliament of Vanuatu (2004–2008)
