= List of members of the Parliament of Vanuatu (1991–1995) =

The 46 members of the Parliament of Vanuatu from 1991 to 1995 were elected on 2 December 1991.

== List of members ==
Constituency	Member	Party
Ambae	Bangabiti Amos	Union of Moderate Parties
Ambae	Bue Samson	Union of Moderate Parties
Ambae	Onneyn Tahi	National United Party
Ambrym	Batick Blaise	Union of Moderate Parties
Ambrym	Jack Hopa	Vanua'aku Pati
Banks/Torres	Derek Vanua	National United Party
Banks/Torres	Cecil Sinker	National United Party
Efate	Jimmy Meto Chillia	Vanua'aku Pati
Efate	Donald Kalpokas	Vanua'aku Pati
Efate	Carlot Louis	Union of Moderate Parties
Efate	Barak Sopé	Melanesian Progressive Party
Epi	Jimmy Simon	Melanesian Progressive Party
Luganville	Alfred Maseng	Union of Moderate Parties
Luganville	Edward Tambisari	National United Party
Maewo	James Tamata	Vanua'aku Pati
Malekula	Paul Telukluk	Union of Moderate Parties
Malekula	Jerrety Rasen	Union of Moderate Parties
Malekula	Sethy Reganvanu	National United Party
Malekula	Batick Romain	Union of Moderate Parties
Malekula	Elson Samuel	Melanesian Progressive Party
Malekula	Soksok Vital	Union of Moderate Parties
Other Southern Island	Edward Natapei	Vanua'aku Pati
Paama	Demis Lango	Union of Moderate Parties
Pentecost	Allen Bule	National United Party
Pentecost	Job Bulewu	National United Party
Pentecost	Walter Lini	National United Party
Pentecost	Vincent Boulekone	Tan Union
Port Vila	Alick Hopman Allan	Vanua'aku Pati
Port Vila	Thomas Faratia	Vanua'aku Pati
Port Vila	Willie Jimmy	Union of Moderate Parties
Port Vila	Maxime Carlot Korman	Union of Moderate Parties
Port Vila	Motarilavoa Hilda Lin̄i	National United Party
Santo/Malo/Aore	Pisuvoke Ravutia Albert	Fren Melanesian Party
Santo/Malo/Aore	Franky Steven	Nagriamel
Santo/Malo/Aore	Vurobaravu Molieno	Union of Moderate Parties
Santo/Malo/Aore	Sela Molisa	Vanua'aku Pati
Santo/Malo/Aore	Serge Vohor	Union of Moderate Parties
Santo/Malo/Aore	Timothy Weles	Union of Moderate Parties
Tanna	Iolu Abil	Vanua'aku Pati
Tanna	Charley Nako	Union of Moderate Parties
Tanna	Iouiou Henry	Vanua'aku Pati
Tanna	Lop Kissel	Union of Moderate Parties
Tanna	Jeffrey Lahva	Melanesian Progressive Party
Tanna	Koeasipai Song	Union of Moderate Parties
Tongoa/Sherpherds	Calo Joseph	Union of Moderate Parties
Tongoa/Sherpherds	David Karie Robert	National United Party
Source: Official Gazette
