= List of members of the Parliament of Vanuatu (1995–1998) =

The 50 members of the Parliament of Vanuatu from 1995 to 1998 were elected on 30 November 1995.

== List of members ==
Constituency	Member	Party
Ambae	Amos Bangabiti	Union of Moderate Parties
Ambae	Samson Bue	Union of Moderate Parties
Ambae	Silas Hakwa	Unity Front
Ambrym	Amos Andeng	Union of Moderate Parties
Ambrym	Daniel Bangtor	Unity Front
Banks and Torres	John Hughug	National United Party
Banks and Torres	Edgel Wetin	National United Party
Efate	Louis Carlot	Union of Moderate Parties
Efate	Donald Kalpokas	Unity Front
Efate	Jimmy Meto Chillia	Unity Front
Efate	Barak Sopé	Unity Front
Epi	Willie Varasmate	Independent
Luganville	Alfred Maseng	Union of Moderate Parties
Luganville	Paolo Tabivaka	Unity Front
Maewo	James Tamata	Unity Front
Malekula	Josiah Bahavus	Unity Front
Malekula	Gideon Bakon	National United Party
Malekula	Sato Kilman	Unity Front
Malekula	Cyriaque Metmetsan	Union of Moderate Parties
Malekula	John Morrisen	Unity Front
Malekula	Vital Soksok	Union of Moderate Parties
Malekula	Paul Telukluk	Union of Moderate Parties
Paama	Demis Lango	Union of Moderate Parties
Pentecost	Edouard Muelsul	Nagriamel
Pentecost	Vincent Boulekone	Unity Front
Pentecost	Allen Bule	National United Party
Pentecost	Walter Lini	National United Party
Port Vila	William Edgell	Unity Front
Port Vila	Willie Jimmy	Union of Moderate Parties
Port Vila	Motarilavoa Hilda Lin̄i	National United Party
Port Vila	Maxime Carlot Korman	Union of Moderate Parties
Port Vila	Edward Natapei	Unity Front
Port Vila	Jackleen Ruben Titek	Unity Front
Santo/Malo	Embert Jimmy	Union of Moderate Parties
Santo/Malo	Sela Molisa	Unity Front
Santo/Malo	Philip Pasvu	Unity Front
Santo/Malo	Albert Ravutia	Fren Melanesian Party
Santo/Malo	John Tari	National United Party
Santo/Malo	Louise Taribe	Union of Moderate Parties
Santo/Malo	Serge Vohor	Union of Moderate Parties
Southern Islands	Allan Navuki	Unity Front
Tanna	Henry Iauko	Unity Front
Tanna	Jeffrey Lava	Unity Front
Tanna	Charlie Nako	Union of Moderate Parties
Tanna	Joe Natuman	Unity Front
Tanna	Shem Naukaut	National United Party
Tanna	Iarris Naunun	Independent
Tanna	Keasipai Song	Union of Moderate Parties
Tongoa/Shepherds	Robert Karie	National United Party
Tongoa/Shepherds	John Moris Lee Solomon	Union of Moderate Parties
Source: Official Gazette
