= 2002 Vanuatuan general election =

General election held in Vanuatu

- 2 May 2002
- All 52 seats in Parliament; 26 seats needed for a majority
Party	Leader	Vote %	Seats	+/–
UMP	Serge Vohor	15.15	15	+3
Vanua'aku	Edward Natapei	17.07	14	+4
NUP	Ham Lin̄i	13.48	8	−3
Republican	Maxime Carlot Korman	6.76	3	+2
MPP	Barak Sopé	7.93	2	−4
Green	Gérard Leymang	4.68	2	New
PPP	Sato Kliman	5.10	1	New
FMP	Pisovuke Albert Ravutia	1.98	1	New
Namangi Aute	Paul Telukluk	1.20	1	New
Independents	—	19.27	5	+3
This lists parties that won seats. See the complete results below.
Results by constituency
Prime Minister before	Subsequent Prime Minister
Edward Natapei; Vanua'aku	Edward Natapei; Vanua'aku

General elections were held in Vanuatu on 2 May 2002. The result was a victory for the Union of Moderate Parties, which won 15 of the 52 seats. After the elections, the Parliament re-elected VP leader Edward Natapei as Prime Minister.

== Results ==
Party	Votes	%	Seats	+/–
Vanua'aku Pati	13,509	17.07	14	–4
Union of Moderate Parties	11,989	15.15	15	+3
National United Party	10,667	13.48	8	–3
Melanesian Progressive Party	6,274	7.93	2	–4
Vanuatu Republican Party	5,354	6.76	3	+2
People's Progressive Party	4,039	5.10	1	New
Green Confederation	3,701	4.68	2	New
National Community Association	2,624	3.32	0	New
Friend Melanesian Party	1,566	1.98	1	New
PC	1,169	1.48	0	New
Namangi Aute	953	1.20	1	New
Vanuatu Independent Movement	936	1.18	0	New
Tan Union	609	0.77	0	New
Nagriamel	505	0.64	0	0
Independents	15,251	19.27	5	+3
Total	79,146	100.00	52	0
Valid votes	79,146	98.25		
Invalid/blank votes	1,412	1.75		
Total votes	80,558	100.00		
Registered voters/turnout	127,069	63.40		
Source: Extraordinary Gazette

=== By constituency ===
Ambae
Candidate	Party	Votes	%
Jacques Sese	Union of Moderate Parties	767	17.43
Samson Bue	Union of Moderate Parties	764	17.36
James Bule	National United Party	671	15.25
Peter Vuta	Independent	560	12.72
Wilson Ray Aru	Vanua'aku Pati	376	8.54
Amos Bangabiti	Vanuatu Republican Party	369	8.38
John Tariweu Mera Wari	Independent	265	6.02
Andrew Mark Tari	Vanuatu Independent Movement	198	4.50
Tarikwaka Hollingsworth	Independent	190	4.32
John Tarilama	Vanua'aku Pati	153	3.48
Frank Bolle	Melanesian Progressive Party	65	1.48
Maxwel Thomas	PC	23	0.52
Total		4,401	100.00
Valid votes		4,401	98.48
Invalid/blank votes		68	1.52
Total votes		4,469	100.00
Registered voters/turnout		6,387	69.97

Ambrym
Candidate	Party	Votes	%
Roger Abiut	Independent	509	15.19
Raphael Worwor	Union of Moderate Parties	467	13.94
Jossie Masmas	Vanuatu Republican Party	457	13.64
Daniel Aaron Bangto	Vanua'aku Pati	409	12.21
Lengkone Irene Bongnaim	Vanuatu Republican Party	373	11.13
Edwin Wuan	National Community Association	310	9.25
Marokon Alilee	Independent	219	6.54
Andrew Welwel	Melanesian Progressive Party	188	5.61
Charlie Tugon	National United Party	187	5.58
Avock Pandad Bakon	PC	132	3.94
Rene Haoul	Green Confederation	100	2.98
Total		3,351	100.00
Valid votes		3,351	97.50
Invalid/blank votes		86	2.50
Total votes		3,437	100.00
Registered voters/turnout		5,154	66.69

Banks and Torres
Candidate	Party	Votes	%
Nicholas Brown	Independent	697	21.52
Barnabas Wilson	National United Party	682	21.06
Hilton Dunstan	People's Progressive Party	464	14.33
Reginold Stanley	National United Party	437	13.49
Paul Kammy	Melanesian Progressive Party	304	9.39
Nelson Bann	Union of Moderate Parties	255	7.87
Aiden Lawrence Wilson	National Community Association	192	5.93
Edwin Basil	Vanuatu Republican Party	128	3.95
Wilfred Erislomegev	PC	80	2.47
Total		3,239	100.00
Valid votes		3,239	99.54
Invalid/blank votes		15	0.46
Total votes		3,254	100.00
Registered voters/turnout		4,375	74.38

Efate
Candidate	Party	Votes	%
Donald Kalpokas	Vanua'aku Pati	875	10.21
Jimmy Meto Chilia	National United Party	753	8.79
Barak Sopé	Melanesian Progressive Party	730	8.52
Steven Kalsakau	Union of Moderate Parties	642	7.49
Natonga Kolen	National Community Association	591	6.90
Rore Sampo	Independent	527	6.15
Foster Rakon	Vanua'aku Pati	513	5.99
Joe Bormal Carlo	Vanua'aku Pati	507	5.92
Jonstone Kalman Tau	Independent	384	4.48
Bill Kalsrap Kalpoi	Green Confederation	307	3.58
Brothy Thomas Faratia	Independent	300	3.50
Norris Jac	People's Progressive Party	292	3.41
Donald Manamena	People's Progressive Party	283	3.30
Lionel Kaluat	Vanuatu Republican Party	281	3.28
Frank Lota Numalo	Tan Union	230	2.68
Jack Kallon	National Community Association	228	2.66
Charley Kalmet Mpakus	Melanesian Progressive Party	206	2.40
Louis Carlot	Vanuatu Republican Party	191	2.23
David Richard Fantanumata	Vanuatu Independent Movement	170	1.98
Leias Manu Cullwick	Independent	129	1.51
Kalsua Momo Masaii	Independent	117	1.37
Peris Kalopong	Independent	105	1.23
Hendon Sigari Manulapalapa Solomon Lagi Atu Kalsakau	Independent	63	0.74
Sakary Fateful	Independent	60	0.70
Peter K. Taurakoto	Independent	34	0.40
Amos Wayane	Vanuatu Independent Movement	32	0.37
Joel Kaltamat Aka	Independent	18	0.21
Total		8,568	100.00
Valid votes		8,568	98.37
Invalid/blank votes		142	1.63
Total votes		8,710	100.00
Registered voters/turnout		15,518	56.13

Epi
Candidate	Party	Votes	%
Jean Galibert	Vanuatu Republican Party	463	20.50
Isabelle Donald	Vanua'aku Pati	443	19.61
Korah Maki	Union of Moderate Parties	348	15.41
Mowa Kora	Melanesian Progressive Party	273	12.08
Joshua Fakamali	National United Party	268	11.86
Simeon William Davidson	People's Progressive Party	207	9.16
Kaindum Baiagk Atis	Independent	125	5.53
Michel Alick Sokoliu	Independent	93	4.12
Tony Nehemaiah	Vanuatu Independent Movement	35	1.55
Amarilui James	PC	4	0.18
Total		2,259	100.00
Valid votes		2,259	99.12
Invalid/blank votes		20	0.88
Total votes		2,279	100.00
Registered voters/turnout		3,052	74.67

Luganville
Candidate	Party	Votes	%
George Wells	Vanua'aku Pati	637	21.30
Francois Luc Baba	Union of Moderate Parties	557	18.63
Jimmy Awa	Melanesian Progressive Party	414	13.85
Leo Tamata	National United Party	330	11.04
Joseph Luke	Green Confederation	175	5.85
Sam Albert Toa	Independent	175	5.85
Jean Mark Massing Naleng	PC	157	5.25
Mathilda Hohinke	Vanuatu Republican Party	118	3.95
Japeth Piter	Friend Melanesian Party	114	3.81
Aindep Kensen	Independent	111	3.71
Samuel Restuntune	People's Progressive Party	93	3.11
Elizabeth Tasso	Vanuatu Independent Movement	51	1.71
Peter Mowa Paralyiu	Tan Union	33	1.10
Tom Gideon Havok	National Community Association	25	0.84
Total		2,990	100.00
Valid votes		2,990	97.62
Invalid/blank votes		73	2.38
Total votes		3,063	100.00
Registered voters/turnout		6,873	44.57

Maewo
Candidate	Party	Votes	%
Philip Boedoro	Vanua'aku Pati	632	47.66
Raul Ren Tari	National United Party	351	26.47
Gibson Liu	Independent	193	14.56
James Adin Tamata	Melanesian Progressive Party	96	7.24
Paul Siro	People's Progressive Party	54	4.07
Total		1,326	100.00
Valid votes		1,326	99.25
Invalid/blank votes		10	0.75
Total votes		1,336	100.00
Registered voters/turnout		1,746	76.52

Malekula
Candidate	Party	Votes	%
Sato Kilman	People's Progressive Party	985	8.23
Paul Telukluk	Namangi Aute	782	6.53
Jackleen Reuben Titek Ambil Masdan	Vanua'aku Pati	676	5.65
Esmon Saimon	Melanesian Progressive Party	648	5.41
John Morris Willie	Vanua'aku Pati	609	5.09
Jepeth Mali Nawilau	Independent	538	4.50
Donna Browny	Vanuatu Republican Party	525	4.39
Staki Bong	National United Party	512	4.28
Jacob Thyna	Friend Melanesian Party	465	3.89
Lucien Litoung	National United Party	424	3.54
Pierre Andrew Natnaur	Independent	418	3.49
Obed Masingiow	Vanua'aku Pati	381	3.18
Jenneck Samuel	Independent MUIF	381	3.18
Cyriaque Metmetsan	Union of Moderate Parties	378	3.16
Willion Nimbwen	Melanesian Progressive Party	324	2.71
Maxwell Maltok	Independent	323	2.70
Ennis Simeon	Melanesian Progressive Party	316	2.64
Longdal Nobel	Union of Moderate Parties	306	2.56
Hugo Belbong	PC	292	2.44
Dominique Lockvaro	Green Confederation	260	2.17
Marcellino Barthelemy	National Community Association	243	2.03
Willie Yannic	Vanuatu Republican Party	211	1.76
Manjab Androng	Independent	208	1.74
Rasen Jerethy	Union of Moderate Parties	204	1.70
George Thompson	People's Progressive Party	199	1.66
Fabian Maleb	Union of Moderate Parties	190	1.59
Nbekrow Kolen	Independent	187	1.56
Willie Apia Masing	Independent	176	1.47
Timothy Maxime Nibtirk	Namangi Aute	171	1.43
Nibtik Markson	Independent VNCNP	126	1.05
Anata Lingtamat	Independent	121	1.01
Jimmy Daniel Aptvanu	Independent	96	0.80
Labi Anderson	National United Party	85	0.71
Boie Kalboie	PC	75	0.63
William Shem David	Independent	69	0.58
Gideon Harrison Navat	Independent	64	0.53
Total		11,968	100.00
Valid votes		11,968	98.53
Invalid/blank votes		178	1.47
Total votes		12,146	100.00
Registered voters/turnout		15,789	76.93

Malo–Aore
Candidate	Party	Votes	%
Leo Tamata	Vanua'aku Pati	486	25.16
Alvea Sano	Melanesian Progressive Party	483	25.00
Josias Moli	Union of Moderate Parties	467	24.17
Natu Muele	National United Party	165	8.54
Maso John	People's Progressive Party	119	6.16
SL George Tavut	Friend Melanesian Party	90	4.66
Tensley Moli	Vanuatu Republican Party	81	4.19
Ken Mansi	Nagriamel	41	2.12
Total		1,932	100.00
Valid votes		1,932	99.08
Invalid/blank votes		18	0.92
Total votes		1,950	100.00
Registered voters/turnout		2,806	69.49

Other Southern Islands
Candidate	Party	Votes	%
Thomas Nithitauaei	Vanua'aku Pati	581	41.03
Thomas Nentu	Vanuatu Republican Party	343	24.22
Rasel Lovo	Green Confederation	148	10.45
Federick Yaweva	Union of Moderate Parties	142	10.03
Apei John Mete	Melanesian Progressive Party	121	8.55
Narvot Jacob	People's Progressive Party	81	5.72
Total		1,416	100.00
Valid votes		1,416	99.16
Invalid/blank votes		12	0.84
Total votes		1,428	100.00
Registered voters/turnout		1,747	81.74

Paama
Candidate	Party	Votes	%
Sam Dan Avok	Vanua'aku Pati	424	49.42
David Willie Tiaen	Melanesian Progressive Party	313	36.48
Noel Takau	Vanuatu Republican Party	121	14.10
Total		858	100.00
Valid votes		858	99.31
Invalid/blank votes		6	0.69
Total votes		864	100.00
Registered voters/turnout		1,133	76.26

Pentecost
Candidate	Party	Votes	%
Ham Lini	National United Party	845	14.30
Charlot Salwai	Union of Moderate Parties	534	9.03
Michael Ture	Independent	533	9.02
David Tosul	National United Party	455	7.70
Edouard Melsul	Vanuatu Republican Party	389	6.58
Gaetano Bulewak	Green Confederation	329	5.57
Moses Tabi	Independent	329	5.57
Frazer Sine	Independent	323	5.46
Barnabas Andy Tabi	National United Party	290	4.91
Ezekiel Bule	Melanesian Progressive Party	289	4.89
Noel Tamata	People's Progressive Party	273	4.62
Tabisini Mikael	Independent	249	4.21
Luke Fago Warry	Vanuatu Independent Movement	233	3.94
James Lala	Vanua'aku Pati	150	2.54
Robson Sire	National Community Association	148	2.50
Jonas Tabi Kuran	National United Party	140	2.37
John Leo Tamata	Independent	123	2.08
Philion Nari	Vanuatu Independent Movement	108	1.83
Norbet Sumsum	Green Confederation	89	1.51
Edwin Buletik	National Community Association	49	0.83
Clement Bule	Independent	33	0.56
Total		5,911	100.00
Valid votes		5,911	97.72
Invalid/blank votes		138	2.28
Total votes		6,049	100.00
Registered voters/turnout		9,440	64.08

Port Vila
Candidate	Party	Votes	%
Edward Natapei	Vanua'aku Pati	1,223	12.82
Moana Carcasses Kalosil	Green Confederation	774	8.11
Willie Jimmy	National United Party	593	6.21
Job Dalesa	Vanua'aku Pati	552	5.78
Henri Taga Tarikarea	Union of Moderate Parties	549	5.75
Maxime Carlot Korman	Vanuatu Republican Party	487	5.10
Alick George Noel	Union of Moderate Parties	425	4.45
Marie Noelle Ferrieux Patterson	Independent	380	3.98
Ken Hosea	Melanesian Progressive Party	367	3.85
Kaloris Willie	Independent	362	3.79
Ephraim Kalsakau	Tan Union	346	3.63
Clement Leo	Vanua'aku Pati	345	3.62
Pierre Tore	Independent	340	3.56
George Bogiri	National United Party	302	3.16
Peter Sali Sovua	Independent	282	2.96
Nasse Steward	National Community Association	262	2.75
Peter Bong	National Community Association	255	2.67
Joseph Tord	Union of Moderate Parties	249	2.61
Vanusoksok Fidele	People's Progressive Party	221	2.32
Sam Siko Mahit	Independent	183	1.92
Maurice Michel	Independent	162	1.70
Johnny Albert Stephen	Independent	146	1.53
Willi Oli Varasmaite	Independent	134	1.40
William Edgell	Independent	129	1.35
Shem Rarua	PC	107	1.12
James Kere	Independent	107	1.12
Claes J. O. Bjornum	Vanuatu Independent Movement	79	0.83
Eileen R. Leitaripoa	Independent	75	0.79
William Haling	Independent	58	0.61
Jim Moli James	Independent	26	0.27
Roselyn Tor	Independent	23	0.24
Total		9,543	100.00
Valid votes		9,543	98.16
Invalid/blank votes		179	1.84
Total votes		9,722	100.00
Registered voters/turnout		18,972	51.24

Santo
Candidate	Party	Votes	%
Sela Molisa	Vanua'aku Pati	945	10.11
Serge Vohor	Union of Moderate Parties	858	9.18
Pisuvoke Albert Ravutia	Friend Melanesian Party	696	7.45
Jimmys Imbert	Union of Moderate Parties	510	5.46
Philip Andikar	Independent	509	5.45
Denis Philip	Union of Moderate Parties	506	5.41
Mahe Jean Alain	Union of Moderate Parties	502	5.37
Sandy Iavcuth	National United Party	458	4.90
Vatambe Reme	Melanesian Progressive Party	445	4.76
John Tarimolibaraf	National United Party	435	4.65
lavro Boaz	Vanua'aku Pati	420	4.49
Shem Kalo	National United Party	401	4.29
Silas Poporo	Vanuatu Republican Party	401	4.29
Edouard Bororoa	Independent	316	3.38
Savuia Saksak	Nagriamel	236	2.52
Steven Loddy	Nagriamel	228	2.44
James Surai	Independent	218	2.33
Alain Aruvuti	Vanuatu Republican Party	216	2.31
Philip Pasvu Iercet	Independent	212	2.27
Matsamatsa Maxwel	Friend Melanesian Party	201	2.15
Hutchinson Andrew	Independent	116	1.24
Tom Tafti Valele	Melanesian Progressive Party	107	1.14
Manuel Peter	PC	105	1.12
Daniel RM Molisa	People's Progressive Party	100	1.07
Stephen Boroni	Vanua'aku Pati	79	0.85
Andrew Jimmy	Independent	69	0.74
Visi Barnabas	PC	58	0.62
Total		9,347	100.00
Valid votes		9,347	97.25
Invalid/blank votes		264	2.75
Total votes		9,611	100.00
Registered voters/turnout		14,411	66.69

Shepherds
Candidate	Party	Votes	%
Toara Daniel Kalo	Union of Moderate Parties	422	57.65
Amos Titongoa	Vanua'aku Pati	307	41.94
Donald Kalo	National United Party	3	0.41
Total		732	100.00
Valid votes		732	99.59
Invalid/blank votes		3	0.41
Total votes		735	100.00
Registered voters/turnout		965	76.17

Tanna
Candidate	Party	Votes	%
Joe Natuman	Vanua'aku Pati	910	8.87
Morking Stevens	National United Party	812	7.92
Jimmy Nicklam	Vanua'aku Pati	669	6.52
Willy Posen	Union of Moderate Parties	627	6.11
Isaac Judah	Union of Moderate Parties	608	5.93
François Koapa	Union of Moderate Parties	594	5.79
Keasipai Song	Green Confederation	534	5.21
Moses Kahu	Independent	497	4.85
Tom Nipiau	People's Progressive Party	477	4.65
Johnny Lava Napilepile	Independent	458	4.47
Harry Iauko	National United Party	449	4.38
Willie Lop	Independent	432	4.21
Harris Naunun	Green Confederation	415	4.05
Richard Tapo	National United Party	343	3.34
Simon Kaukare	Independent	330	3.22
Yauko Henry	Melanesian Progressive Party	325	3.17
Barnabas Tausi	National Community Association	321	3.13
Willie Toama	Green Confederation	312	3.04
George Nanua	Green Confederation	258	2.52
Peter Jeremiah	Vanuatu Republican Party	200	1.95
Oavid Hosea	People's Progressive Party	191	1.86
lala Nipio	Melanesian Progressive Party	179	1.75
Peter Etap	Independent	147	1.43
Masel Wilson Manua	Independent	120	1.17
Johnny Katu	Independent	36	0.35
Jack Kapum	PC	13	0.13
Total		10,257	100.00
Valid votes		10,257	98.15
Invalid/blank votes		193	1.85
Total votes		10,450	100.00
Registered voters/turnout		17,209	60.72

Tongoa
Candidate	Party	Votes	%
Seule Tom	National United Party	276	26.34
John Robert Alick	Vanua'aku Pati	207	19.75
Peter Morris	Independent	205	19.56
Abert Moses Mariasi	PC	123	11.74
David Michel Taripoa	Union of Moderate Parties	118	11.26
John Pakoa Rik	Melanesian Progressive Party	81	7.73
Willie James Taripoarerei	Vanuatu Independent Movement	30	2.86
Supa Tisanaripu KR	Independent	8	0.76
Total		1,048	100.00
Valid votes		1,048	99.34
Invalid/blank votes		7	0.66
Total votes		1,055	100.00
Registered voters/turnout		1,492	70.71

== See also ==
- List of members of the Parliament of Vanuatu (2002–2004)
