= 1998 Vanuatuan general election =

General election held in Vanuatu

- 6 March 1998
- All 52 seats in Parliament; 26 seats needed for a majority
Party	Leader	Vote %	Seats	+/–
Vanua'aku	Donald Kalpokas	21.01	18	+5
UMP	Serge Vohor	19.95	12	−5
NUP	Walter Lin̄i	15.89	11	+2
MPP	Barak Sopé	13.99	6	+1
John Frum	Keasipai Song	2.23	2	New
Republican	Maxime Carlot Korman	7.65	1	New
Independents	—	14.62	2	0
This lists parties that won seats. See the complete results below.
Results by constituency
Prime Minister before	Subsequent Prime Minister
Serge Vohor; UMP	Donald Kalpokas; Vanua'aku Pati

General elections were held in Vanuatu on 6 March 1998. They "were held under the shadow of a state of emergency (the result of riots in Port Vila over governmental financial improprieties) and were accompanied by an unusually low turnout rate", with only 64% of registered voters casting a ballot.

The Vanua'aku Pati, led by Donald Kalpokas, obtained 18 seats. The ruling Union of Moderate Parties obtained 12, while the National United Party obtained 11, and the Melanesian Progressive Party 6.

The Vanua'aku Pati returned to power for the first time since 1991, forming a coalition with the NUP. Donald Kalpokas (VP) became Prime Minister, with Walter Lini (NUP) as deputy Prime Minister. The new government was exclusively anglophone, following the defeat of the francophone UMP.

== Results ==
Party	Votes	%	Seats	+/–
Vanua'aku Pati	14,467	21.01	18	+5
Union of Moderate Parties	13,743	19.95	12	–5
National United Party	10,947	15.89	11	+2
Melanesian Progressive Party	9,635	13.99	6	+1
Vanuatu Republican Party	5,266	7.65	1	New
John Frum Movement	1,539	2.23	2	New
People's Democratic Party	748	1.09	0	0
Movement Blong Yumi	656	0.95	0	New
Liberal Party	567	0.82	0	New
Vanuatu Women in Politics	488	0.71	0	0
Vemarana	299	0.43	0	New
Christian Independent Candidates	288	0.42	0	0
Nagriamel	162	0.24	0	–1
Independents	10,067	14.62	2	0
Total	68,872	100.00	52	+2
Valid votes	68,872	99.32		
Invalid/blank votes	474	0.68		
Total votes	69,346	100.00		
Registered voters/turnout	108,005	64.21		
Source: Official Gazette

=== By constituency ===
Ambae
Candidate	Party	Votes	%
James Bule	National United Party	761	19.76
Jacques Sese	Union of Moderate Parties	672	17.45
Silas Charles Hakwa	Vanua'aku Pati	634	16.46
Samson Bue	Union of Moderate Parties	582	15.11
Japin C. Tari	Vanua'aku Pati	384	9.97
John Morris Tari	People's Democratic Party	351	9.11
Anderson Tari	Melanesian Progressive Party	264	6.85
Amos Bangabiti	Vanuatu Republican Party	204	5.30
Total		3,852	100.00
Valid votes		3,852	99.66
Invalid/blank votes		13	0.34
Total votes		3,865	100.00
Registered voters/turnout		5,677	68.08

Ambrym
Candidate	Party	Votes	%
Aaron Daniel Bongtor	Vanua'aku Pati	607	18.88
Irene Leingkone Bongnaim	Union of Moderate Parties	458	14.25
Willie Malon	Independent	387	12.04
Abel Tatu	Vanuatu Republican Party	295	9.18
David Bong Masing	Melanesian Progressive Party	266	8.27
Amos Dalong	Independent	194	6.03
Edwin Wuan	National United Party	187	5.82
Amos Andeng	Independent	165	5.13
Gershom Atutur Tolmoling	Liberal Party	132	4.11
Williamson Obed Naros	Independent	118	3.67
Talsil Olsen	Nagriamel	90	2.80
Andrew Welwel	Independent	86	2.67
Gilbert Haoul	Union of Moderate Parties	79	2.46
George Bumseng	Independent	78	2.43
Alfred Maseng	Independent	73	2.27
Total		3,215	100.00
Valid votes		3,215	99.78
Invalid/blank votes		7	0.22
Total votes		3,222	100.00
Registered voters/turnout		4,493	71.71

Banks and Torres
Candidate	Party	Votes	%
Reginold Stanley	National United Party	725	24.48
Barnabas Wilson	National United Party	627	21.18
Luke Titinson Dini	Union of Moderate Parties	548	18.51
John Dickenson Hughug	Vanua'aku Pati	477	16.11
John Mark	Melanesian Progressive Party	362	12.23
Henry Nelson Nin	Vanuatu Republican Party	207	6.99
Tagar Wycliffe	Independent	15	0.51
Total		2,961	100.00
Valid votes		2,961	99.73
Invalid/blank votes		8	0.27
Total votes		2,969	100.00
Registered voters/turnout		4,019	73.87

Efate
Candidate	Party	Votes	%
Donald Kalpokas	Vanua'aku Pati	1,109	16.06
Barak Sopé	Melanesian Progressive Party	684	9.90
Foster Rakom	Vanua'aku Pati	557	8.07
Joe Romal Calo	Vanua'aku Pati	534	7.73
Lionel Kaluat	Vanuatu Republican Party	515	7.46
Roro Sambo	Union of Moderate Parties	460	6.66
Jimmy Meto Chilia	National United Party	454	6.57
Natonga Saby	Independent	387	5.60
Thomas Brothy Faratia	Vanuatu Republican Party	329	4.76
Jean Claude Kanegai	Independent	300	4.34
Louis Guy Carlot	Union of Moderate Parties	296	4.29
Russel Malakai	Vanuatu Republican Party	259	3.75
Leiasmanu Cullwick	Vanuatu Women in Politics	248	3.59
Kalegor Steele	Melanesian Progressive Party	195	2.82
Bill Kalsrap Kalpoi	Independent	187	2.71
Kalmut Wilfred Kalpukai	Liberal Party	123	1.78
Peter K. Taurakoto	National United Party	121	1.75
Joel Felix Kaltamat	Independent	60	0.87
Toto Leoped Talkanamal	Independent	48	0.70
Nunu Naperikimala Alick Soalo	Independent	40	0.58
Total		6,906	100.00
Valid votes		6,906	99.11
Invalid/blank votes		62	0.89
Total votes		6,968	100.00
Registered voters/turnout		12,058	57.79

Epi
Candidate	Party	Votes	%
Willie Olli Varasmaite	Vanua'aku Pati	656	33.10
Kila Lemaya	Union of Moderate Parties	362	18.26
Jean Galibert	Vanuatu Republican Party	276	13.93
Apia Rinjo	Melanesian Progressive Party	256	12.92
Michel Sokoliu Alick	National United Party	228	11.50
John Timothy Fred	Independent	105	5.30
Jimmy Joe	Liberal Party	99	4.99
Total		1,982	100.00
Valid votes		1,982	99.35
Invalid/blank votes		13	0.65
Total votes		1,995	100.00
Registered voters/turnout		2,686	74.27

Luganville
Candidate	Party	Votes	%
Annas Tinwaku	National United Party	626	19.36
George Wells	Vanua'aku Pati	604	18.68
Antoine Pikinoune	Union of Moderate Parties	486	15.03
Jimmy Awa	Melanesian Progressive Party	465	14.38
Denis Savoie	Independent	222	6.87
Japeth Michael	Movement Blong Yumi	208	6.43
Tabivaka Paulo Salwai	Vanuatu Republican Party	163	5.04
Jackie J. Ulas	Independent	135	4.18
Mathilda Gausi	Vanuatu Women in Politics	92	2.85
Sepa Katawa	Independent	84	2.60
Harrison Rarua	Independent	82	2.54
Isaiah Terry	Independent	66	2.04
Total		3,233	100.00
Valid votes		3,233	99.23
Invalid/blank votes		25	0.77
Total votes		3,258	100.00
Registered voters/turnout		6,792	47.97

Maewo
Candidate	Party	Votes	%
Paul Ren Tari	National United Party	486	38.36
Peter L. Sale	Vanua'aku Pati	483	38.12
Gregory Tarawban	Melanesian Progressive Party	209	16.50
Ebensezer Boeliv	Liberal Party	55	4.34
Jonah Toakanase	Vanuatu Republican Party	34	2.68
Total		1,267	100.00
Valid votes		1,267	99.37
Invalid/blank votes		8	0.63
Total votes		1,275	100.00
Registered voters/turnout		1,521	83.83

Malekula
Candidate	Party	Votes	%
Sato Kilman	Melanesian Progressive Party	1,351	13.73
Esmon Saimon	Melanesian Progressive Party	838	8.52
Paul Telukluk	Union of Moderate Parties	716	7.28
Josiah Tom Merifar	National United Party	659	6.70
Jackleen Ruben Titeks	Independent	604	6.14
John Morrison Willie	Vanua'aku Pati	567	5.76
Jacob Thyna	Melanesian Progressive Party	564	5.73
Dick Tete	Union of Moderate Parties	503	5.11
Ciriaque Metmetsan	Union of Moderate Parties	479	4.87
Johnny Kalwaisin	National United Party	472	4.80
John V. Kastow	Vanua'aku Pati	410	4.17
Lawa Melenamu	Independent	410	4.17
Sethy Regenvanu	People's Democratic Party	397	4.03
Vital Soksok	Union of Moderate Parties	386	3.92
Dona Don Brownie	Vanuatu Republican Party	365	3.71
Andre Lesines	Vanuatu Republican Party	347	3.53
Isaiah Jeneck	Independent	320	3.25
Raymond Malere	Independent	154	1.57
Edward Korty	Vanuatu Republican Party	110	1.12
Malau Naomi Janita	Vanuatu Women in Politics	106	1.08
Ludovic Mulonturala	Independent	81	0.82
Total		9,839	100.00
Valid votes		9,839	99.22
Invalid/blank votes		77	0.78
Total votes		9,916	100.00
Registered voters/turnout		13,841	71.64

Malo–Aore
Candidate	Party	Votes	%
Josias Moli	Union of Moderate Parties	502	31.36
Nikenike Vurobaravu	Vanua'aku Pati	378	23.61
Riuna Urinamoli	Melanesian Progressive Party	229	14.30
George Tavuti	National United Party	220	13.74
Ben Tom Sua	Vanuatu Republican Party	121	7.56
Makali Baniuri	Independent	99	6.18
Tamata Tahe	Movement Blong Yumi	52	3.25
Total		1,601	100.00
Valid votes		1,601	99.94
Invalid/blank votes		1	0.06
Total votes		1,602	100.00
Registered voters/turnout		2,194	73.02

Other Southern Islands
Candidate	Party	Votes	%
Allen Nafuki	Vanua'aku Pati	600	46.77
James Naling Mackenzie	Union of Moderate Parties	230	17.93
John J. Sing	Vanuatu Republican Party	230	17.93
John Mete Taki Apei	Melanesian Progressive Party	124	9.66
Mike Uyori	John Frum Movement	99	7.72
Total		1,283	100.00
Valid votes		1,283	99.53
Invalid/blank votes		6	0.47
Total votes		1,289	100.00
Registered voters/turnout		1,894	68.06

Paama
Candidate	Party	Votes	%
Sam Dan Avok	Vanua'aku Pati	431	41.24
Timothy V. Tugen	National United Party	260	24.88
Noel Takau	Union of Moderate Parties	250	23.92
Sam Abel Aisik	Vanuatu Republican Party	57	5.45
John Allan	Melanesian Progressive Party	28	2.68
Harry Collins	Independent	19	1.82
Total		1,045	100.00
Valid votes		1,045	99.33
Invalid/blank votes		7	0.67
Total votes		1,052	100.00
Registered voters/turnout		1,573	66.88

Pentecost
Candidate	Party	Votes	%
Walter Lini	National United Party	1,139	21.75
Barnabas Andy Tabi	National United Party	665	12.70
Jonas Tabi Kuran	National United Party	630	12.03
Vincent Boulekone	Union of Moderate Parties	603	11.51
Edwin Buletik	Melanesian Progressive Party	505	9.64
Edouard Muelsul	Vanuatu Republican Party	413	7.89
Marcel Tabius	National United Party	396	7.56
Pierre Chanel Vuti	Union of Moderate Parties	264	5.04
Frederick Tau	Vanua'aku Pati	146	2.79
Bulevanua Vira Leo Molvului	Independent	138	2.64
Alain Wai Molgos	Independent	91	1.74
Simon Malatou	Independent	75	1.43
John Tabisang	Nagriamel	72	1.37
Virelangse Kumuel Tabisang	Independent	67	1.28
Solomon Nari	Independent	33	0.63
Total		5,237	100.00
Valid votes		5,237	99.32
Invalid/blank votes		36	0.68
Total votes		5,273	100.00
Registered voters/turnout		7,770	67.86

Port Vila
Candidate	Party	Votes	%
Edward Natapei	Vanua'aku Pati	880	12.53
Willie Jimmy	Union of Moderate Parties	545	7.76
Wilson Rayaru	Vanua'aku Pati	535	7.62
Maxime Carlot Korman	Vanuatu Republican Party	515	7.33
Clement Leo	Vanua'aku Pati	383	5.45
Henri Taga Tari Karea	Union of Moderate Parties	352	5.01
Claes J. O. Bjornum	Independent	351	5.00
William Edgel	Melanesian Progressive Party	333	4.74
Daniel Lamoureux	Christian Independent Candidates	288	4.10
Shem Rarua	Independent	270	3.85
Jonathan Robert Nasse	Melanesian Progressive Party	265	3.77
Clifford Bice	National United Party	263	3.75
Jeff Joel Patunavnu	Independent	234	3.33
Timothy Maki Masing	Independent	206	2.93
Frank Abel Kasala	Independent	202	2.88
Jacques Nauka Meriago	Union of Moderate Parties	200	2.85
Sam Mahit	Independent	175	2.49
John Maraki Naviti	National United Party	173	2.46
Hilda Lini	Independent	153	2.18
Godwin B. Ligo	Independent	149	2.12
Stephen Salong	Independent	135	1.92
Willie Jack Tiamua	Independent	87	1.24
Maria Kalsakau	Liberal Party	60	0.85
William Ken	Independent	52	0.74
Jim James Moli	Independent	51	0.73
Aiden Lawrence Wilson	Independent	49	0.70
Lucy Sandy	Vanuatu Women in Politics	42	0.60
Charlot Bule Temakon	Independent	39	0.56
Abbie Naviti	Independent	35	0.50
Total		7,022	100.00
Valid votes		7,022	99.01
Invalid/blank votes		70	0.99
Total votes		7,092	100.00
Registered voters/turnout		18,663	38.00

Santo
Candidate	Party	Votes	%
Serge Vohor	Union of Moderate Parties	870	11.11
Sela Molisa	Vanua'aku Pati	821	10.49
Jean Alain Mahe	Union of Moderate Parties	617	7.88
Albert Pisuvoke Ravutia	Melanesian Progressive Party	600	7.66
Philip Pasvu Iercet	Vanua'aku Pati	583	7.45
Jimmy Imbert	Union of Moderate Parties	578	7.38
John Tari Molibaraf	National United Party	472	6.03
Asena Karai	Union of Moderate Parties	339	4.33
Karai Koro	National United Party	312	3.99
Steven Franky	Vemarana	299	3.82
Louis Tiribe	Vanuatu Republican Party	296	3.78
Robert Supe	Melanesian Progressive Party	290	3.70
Thomas Ruben Seru	Melanesian Progressive Party	288	3.68
Mita Kame	Independent	265	3.38
Michael Varisipiti	Independent	224	2.86
Thimoty Welles	Movement Blong Yumi	177	2.26
Vusania Karainiu	Vanuatu Republican Party	146	1.86
Steven Nakato Jimmy	Movement Blong Yumi	146	1.86
Edward Bororoa	Independent	130	1.66
Marmar Vanua	Melanesian Progressive Party	129	1.65
Harry Karaeru	Independent	80	1.02
Tavuire Tamata	Movement Blong Yumi	73	0.93
Beku Behov Tomker	Independent	48	0.61
Gaspard Molipalaud	Independent	46	0.59
Total		7,829	100.00
Valid votes		7,829	98.63
Invalid/blank votes		109	1.37
Total votes		7,938	100.00
Registered voters/turnout		10,957	72.45

Shepherds
Candidate	Party	Votes	%
Amos Titongoa	Vanua'aku Pati	231	25.38
Makali Kalo	Independent	214	23.52
Jack Ronneth Atarualim	Independent	198	21.76
John Morris Lee Solomon	Union of Moderate Parties	98	10.77
Etchin Shem Mosoeripu	National United Party	92	10.11
David Roy Maripu	Melanesian Progressive Party	77	8.46
Total		910	100.00
Valid votes		910	99.78
Invalid/blank votes		2	0.22
Total votes		912	100.00
Registered voters/turnout		1,082	84.29

Tanna
Candidate	Party	Votes	%
Joe Natuman	Vanua'aku Pati	846	8.84
Keasipai Song	John Frum Movement	800	8.36
Willy Posen	Union of Moderate Parties	720	7.53
Jimmy Niclam	Vanua'aku Pati	709	7.41
Henri Iauko	Melanesian Progressive Party	706	7.38
Harris I. Naunun	John Frum Movement	640	6.69
Morking Steven Iatika	Independent	636	6.65
Shem Naukaut	Vanua'aku Pati	591	6.18
Tom Nepip	Melanesian Progressive Party	583	6.09
Mark Iautu	Union of Moderate Parties	505	5.28
Jacques Nirua	Union of Moderate Parties	460	4.81
Peter Etap	Independent	402	4.20
Kilip Semu	National United Party	400	4.18
Charlie Nako	Union of Moderate Parties	369	3.86
Bob Loughman	Independent	350	3.66
John Sanga	National United Party	231	2.41
Kauras George Iamakia	Independent	208	2.17
Nipiknam Lavha	Vanuatu Republican Party	178	1.86
Bob Kuao	Vanuatu Republican Party	154	1.61
Tom Kawia	Liberal Party	78	0.82
Total		9,566	100.00
Valid votes		9,566	99.74
Invalid/blank votes		25	0.26
Total votes		9,591	100.00
Registered voters/turnout		10,974	87.40

Tongoa
Candidate	Party	Votes	%
John Robert Alick	National United Party	348	30.96
Abert Moses Mariasi	Vanua'aku Pati	311	27.67
Pakoa Willie Calo Timatua	Union of Moderate Parties	214	19.04
Richard David Fandanumata	Independent	87	7.74
David Robert Karie	Independent	63	5.60
George Willie Siri	Vanuatu Republican Party	52	4.63
Amos Pakoa	Melanesian Progressive Party	24	2.14
Kenneth Daniel S. T. Pila	Liberal Party	20	1.78
Amos Kalsaruru	Independent	5	0.44
Total		1,124	100.00
Valid votes		1,124	99.56
Invalid/blank votes		5	0.44
Total votes		1,129	100.00
Registered voters/turnout		1,811	62.34

== See also ==
- List of members of the Parliament of Vanuatu (1998–2002)
