= Dinh Van Than =

Ni-Vanuata businessman

Gilbert Đinh Văn Thân, more commonly known as Đinh Văn Thân, is a ni-Vanuatu businessperson and former politician. Ron Crocombe described him in 2007 as "perhaps the wealthiest entrepreneur and largest private employer in Vanuatu, and many say the most politically influential [...] citizen".

Thân is a naturalised citizen of Vanuatu. The Vanuatu Daily Post describes him as "a ni-Vanuatu of Vietnamese parentage". His father began his work in Vanuatu as an "indentured labourer".

The Đinh family have been described as long-standing supporters of the Vanua'aku Pati. In 1991, when the party was about to split, Thân supported its founder and then-leader, the first Prime Minister of Vanuatu, Walter Lini. Thân hosted meetings of Lini and his supporters, and enabled Lini to set up "headquarters" on the premises of one of the companies he owned. Later that year, when Lini was ousted from the leadership of the Vanua'aku Pati, and founded the National United Party, Thân was a prominent member. The relationship between the two men was close; Thân was adopted into Lini's family the same year. Vanua'aku Pati "campaign materials" responded to the split by accusing the NUP of serving Thân's interests, and described Thân as "the owner, financier, host, organiser, director" of the new party. Academic Howard Van Trease suggests it was Thân who advised Lini to create the National United Party, and subsequently to enter into a coalition government with the Union of Moderate Parties. Thân was also a major provider of funds to the party.

Thân obtained the leadership of the NUP in 1999, and led it into the May 2002 general election. In 2003, he was "ousted" and replaced as party leader by Ham Lini, Walter Lini's brother, who later became prime minister. He responded by leaving the NUP and founding the Vanuatu National Party in 2004. The latter's stated aim was to "revive" the "principles" espoused by Walter Lini. Specifically, the party emphasized "the need to develop rural employment opportunities, provide confidence to business and invest in primary industries". It suggested that important positions like the Chief Justice or Ombudsman be given to foreign nationals, while also promising to review the granting of citizenship to foreigners and, despite Thân himself being a businessman of Vietnamese origin, to "restrict Asian business" in the country. It also called for the development of "effective national telecommunications" throughout the nation.

Thân stood unsuccessfully for Parliament as leader of the VNP in the July 2004 general election. His brother, Dominique Đinh, a customary chief on the island of Tanna, left the NUP at the same time as he did, and went on to found the Chiefs' Movement of Vanuatu four years later. His sister, Thitam Goiset, is also involved in customary politics, being reportedly the "president" of the Nagriamel movement before her appointment as Vanuatu's ambassador to Russia in December 2011.

On 16 December 2000, the headline story of the Vanuatu Weekly Hebdomadaire highlighted Thân's "growing generosity", as he planned to "invest about 500 million vatu" in creating a residential area in Tagabe.

In the 2000s, Thân was a member of Vanuatu's Citizenship Commission, tasked with granting or denying citizenship applications from immigrants. Thân accused the commission's Secretary, Képoué Manwo, of falsely informing the commission's president that certain applications, notably from Chinese businessmen, had been approved by the commission, when they had in fact been rejected.

In 2007, Vanuatu's department of forests accused Thân of "logging without a licence, not paying logging fees or forest management charges, breaking the code of logging practice, and causing high safety risks to workers, the public and the environment".

As of January 2011, Thân "owns over ten companies". He once owned Doveair, a domestic airline company which was "closed following the disastrous Port Vila Land riots in 1988". The following year, riots also forced the closure of a meat factory he owned in Port Vila. In January 2011, it was reported Thân planned to launch a domestic airline, Vanuatu Airways. It would provide cheaper fares on domestic flights than Air Vanuatu.
