= Ephraim Kalsakau =

Vanuatuan politician

Ephraim Kalsakau (or Éphraïm Kalsakau) was a ni-Vanuatu trade unionist and politician.

In 1987, he spearheaded the founding of the Vanuatu Labour Party (VLP), to be the political arm of united trade unions. He has rejected the idea that "there is a major difference between the Vanuaaku Pati and the UMP", the country's two major parties.

In 2004, he stood unsuccessfully for Parliament as a VLP candidate in Port Vila. In the 2008 general election, he was elected to Parliament, representing the VLP.

He is currently the secretary general of the Vanuatu National Workers Union. He passed on 13 December 2024.
