= Friend Melanesian Party =

- Founded: 1975
- Ideology: Decentralisation
- Political position: Centre
- Parliament: 0 / 52

The Friend Melanesian Party (FMP) is a political party in Vanuatu. The party is usually seen as close to the Union of Moderate Parties.

== History ==
The FMP was formed in 1975 by French-speaking Protestant Pisovuke Albert Ravutia as a reaction to the success of the New Hebrides National Party. In 1981 it joined the francophone Union of Moderate Parties alliance, but due to the Catholic dominance of the alliance in contrast to the Protestant majority in the FMP, it opted to remain an individual party and fielded candidates against the UMP.

In the 1983 general elections the party received 2.3% of the vote, winning a single seat in Parliament, aligning itself with the UMP. It retained its seat in the 1987, 1991 and 1995 elections, but did not contest the 1998 elections. The party returned to Parliament after winning one seat in the 2002 elections, but lost it in the 2004 elections. It also remained seatless after the 2008 elections.

In the 2012 elections the party nominated three candidates. It received 0.9% of the vote, failing to win a seat. In the 2016 elections the party fielded two candidates, winning one seat; Edwin Amblus in Santo. However the party lost its parliamentary representation following the 2020 election and failed to get it back in the 2022 one.

== Election results ==
=== Parliament ===
Election	Leader	Votes	%	Seats	+/–	Status
1975	Pisovuke Albert Ravutia	457	0.89 (#6)	0 / 29	New	Extra-parliamentary
1977		Boycotted		0 / 38	0	Extra-parliamentary
1979		Did not contest		0 / 39	0	Extra-parliamentary
1983		1,014	2.30 (#6)	1 / 39	▲1	Opposition
1987		1,119	1.99 (#4)	1 / 46	0	Opposition
1991		1,157	1.86 (#7)	1 / 46	0	Opposition
1995		2,019	2.66 (#4)	1 / 50	0	Opposition
1998		Did not contest		0 / 52	▼1	Extra-parliamentary
2002		1,566	1.98 (#9)	1 / 52	▲1	Opposition
2004		1,101	1.19 (#13)	0 / 52	▼1	Extra-parliamentary
2008		270	0.26 (#24)	0 / 52	0	Extra-parliamentary
2012		1,069	0.89 (#19)	0 / 52	0	Extra-parliamentary
2016		1,465	1.30 (#17)	1 / 52	▲1	Opposition
2020		996	0.69 (#24)	0 / 52	▼1	Extra-parliamentary
2022		229	0.17 (#36)	0 / 52	0	Extra-parliamentary
