= Joshua Kalsakau =

Vanuatuan politician

Joshua Tafura Kalsakau is a Vanuatuan politician. In 2005 Kalsakau, then the Minister for Ni-Vanuatu Business and an MP from Efate representing the National Community Association Party, joined the Vanuatu Labour Party. Kalsakau became the president of the VLP.

Joshua Kalsakau was reelected to his seat in Parliament, as MP for Efate, in the 2008 parliamentary election. After the elections, Kalsakau was named as the new Minister of Justice in the cabinet of Edward Natapei, though he was subsequently dismissed during a Cabinet reshuffle. He returned to government in April 2011, when Prime Minister Sato Kilman (who had ousted Natapei in a vote of no confidence in December 2010) was in turn ousted in a vote of no confidence, and succeeded by Serge Vohor. Vohor gave the Labour Party two portfolios in his Cabinet, and Kalsakau was appointed Deputy Prime Minister. Three weeks later, however, Vohor's election and premiership were voided by the Court of Appeal, and Kalsakau lost his position in government. On 16 June, Kilman's election and premiership were themselves voided by the Supreme Court, on constitutional grounds, and previous Prime Minister Edward Natapei became caretaker Prime Minister until a new leader could be elected. Kalsakau was appointed caretaker Minister of Infrastructure and Public Utilities.

In the 2012 general election, Kalsakau narrowly lost his seat, by a margin of just twelve votes (out of more than 15,000), leaving Labour without representation in Parliament.

Political offices
Preceded by Ham Lini	Deputy Prime Minister of Vanuatu; 2011	Succeeded by Ham Lini
