= Vanuatu Labour Party =

Vanautan political party

Vanuatu Labour Party Vanuatu Leba Pati
- Abbreviation: VLP
- Leader: Joshua Kalsakau
- Founder: Ephraim Kalsakau
- Founded: 3 June 1987
- Ideology: Democratic socialism Labourism
- Political position: Left-wing
- National affiliation: Vanuatu National Workers Union
- Parliament: 0 / 52

Website
- Facebook page

The Vanuatu Labour Party (Bislama: Vanuatu Leba Pati; French: Parti Travailliste du Vanuatu) is a political party in Vanuatu. The party was established on 3 June 1987. It was founded on the initiative of various trade union organizations in order to contest the 1987 parliamentary election. The proposal to found the party was first presented by Ephraim Kalsakau, a leader of the Vanuatu Municipal Workers Union.

In the 1987 polls, it presented four candidates; George Kalsakau in Port Vila, Willy Romain in Tanna, Thomas Reynold in Luganville and Kenneth Satungia of Efate. All four candidates were trade union leaders. Ephraim Kalsakau later claimed that the electoral participation was mainly intended as an awareness-raising effort, and that the party hadn't expected to win any of the seats.

The party did not present candidates in the 1991 parliamentary election.

The party gained parliamentary representation in 2005 as Joshua Kalsakau, then the Minister for Ni-Vanuatu Business and an MP from Efate representing the National Community Association Party, joined the party.

Joshua Kalsakau is the president of the party whilst Lui Kaltonga is its general secretary.

The party is connected to the Vanuatu Council of Trade Unions and the Vanuatu National Workers Union. The main stronghold of the party in the capital Port Vila.

Joshua Kalsakau was reelected from his seat in the 2008 parliamentary election. In Luganville, the party had launched Pierre Malamlaen as its candidate. Malamlaen was however not elected. After the elections, Joshua Kalsakau was named as the new Minister of Justice in the cabinet of Edward Natapei. In the 2012 general election, Kalsakau narrowly lost his seat, by a margin of just twelve votes (out of more than 15,000), leaving Labour without representation in Parliament.
