= People's Action Party (Vanuatu) =

Political party in Vanuatu

The People's Action Party (French: Parti de l'Action Populaire) is a political party in Vanuatu founded in 2003, following a split with Vanua'aku Pati over the process of endorsing candidates for the Ambae constituency in 2002.

At the elections held on 6 July 2004, the party won 1 out of 52 seats. It held its only seat at the election in 2008, and joined the coalition government. It lost this seat at the 2012 election, due to it gaining only 653 voters.
