= Leinavao Tasso =

Vanuatuan politician

Leinavao Tasso (also known as Taso Leinavao) is a politician from Vanuatu who was a member of parliament from 2004 to 2008 and the Minister of Education from 2007 to 2008. She was one of just two women elected to the Parliament of Vanuatu in 2004.

== Early life ==
Tasso was born on Epi island, which is situated to the north end of Vanuatu's Shepherd Islands. She went to secondary school for three years. Later she became a primary school teacher, first at Nguna, an outer island off the north coast of Efate and then in North West Efate.

== Political career ==
In 2004, Tasso was elected to Vanuatu's parliament for the Epi constituency. The only other woman to be elected that year to the parliament of 52 members, Isabelle Donald, also represented Epi, having first been elected in 2002. Their achievement was despite much opposition from men to the idea of having female candidates. Both were members of the Vanua'aku Pati (VP), founded by Walter Lini, the first prime minister of Vanuatu. They both also had a longstanding commitment to voluntary community service through local church organizations, rather than through the networks of the Vanuatu National Council of Women (VNCW), which was sometimes looked down on for being inefficient and beset by the same internal squabbling as the major political parties. In time, their role as politicians came to be respected and they were permitted to hold discussions with the village chiefs.

Tasso and Donald took turns holding ministerial portfolios with Tasso serving as Ministry of Education from 2007 to 2008. In the 2008 elections Tasso was re-elected but not Donald. Donald lodged a complaint against Tasso, accusing her of bribing voters by giving them food prior to the election. The court ruled against Tasso, resulting in a by-election, which neither woman won.
