= People's Progressive Party (Vanuatu) =

- Leader: Sato Kilman
- Founded: 2001
- Split from: Melanesian Progressive Party
- Ideology: Reformism; Social democracy
- Political position: Centre-left
- Parliament: 0 / 52

The People's Progressive Party is a reformist political party in Vanuatu.

At the 6 July 2004 legislative elections, the party won 3 out of 52 seats. The following election saw its seat count increased to 4. Its leader, Sato Kilman served as Deputy Prime Minister and foreign minister of Vanuatu from December 2004 to July 2007. He had made the party an important member of the National United Party-led coalition of Prime Minister Ham Lini but in July 2007, apparently due to corruption charges put against Kilman's secretary, Lini expelled the People's Progress Party from the cabinet. Kilman formed his first legal cabinet in June 2011 and his government was reflected in 2012, with PPP winning six seats. The party was forced into opposition in 2013 when Kilman resigned and Moana Carcasses became prime minister. After 3 MPs crossed the floor Sato Kilman led government again in 2015 until the end of the legislature. In the 2016 election the PPP lost all but one of its seats, and was not included in Charlot Salwai's cabinet. The party kept its only seat in the 2020 election and remained in opposition. Following the 2022 election the PPP won 2 seats and joined the government coalition, with Sato Kilman being granted the position of deputy prime minister.

== Election results ==
Parliament
Election	Leader	Votes	%	Seats	+/–	Government
2002	Sato Kilman	4,039	5.10 (#6)	1 / 52	New	Opposition
2004	Sato Kilman	4,362	4.73 (#7)	4 / 52	▲3	Coalition
2008	Sato Kilman	5,407	8.01 (#5)	4 / 52	0	Coalition
2012	Sato Kilman	9,642	12.19 (#3)	6 / 52	▲2	Coalition
2016	Sato Kilman	5,469	4.84 (#5)	1 / 52	▼5	Opposition
2020	Sato Kilman	2,664	1.85 (#13)	1 / 52	0	Opposition
2022	Sato Kilman	3,221	2.43 (#10)	2 / 52	▲1	Coalition
2025	Sato Kilman	1,310	0.90 (#15)	0 / 52	▼2	Extra-parliamentary

== See also ==
- Category:People's Progressive Party (Vanuatu) politicians
