= Ture Kailo =

Vanuatuan politician (died 2009)

Ture Kailo (died 23 October 2009) was a Vanuatuan politician and member of Parliament.

In October 2009, Kailo travelled to Australia to attend a gathering of MPs from the Pacific Islands region for workshop on democracy. He died in Canberra, Australia while attending the conference on 23 October 2009. The cause of his death was not disclosed. Joe Natuman, a spokesman for the Vanuatu Foreign Ministry, disclosed that Kailo had suffered from asthma. Kailo's body was returned to Vanuatu for burial.
