= Green Confederation =

Vanuatu Green Confederation Vanuatu Grin Konfederesen
- Abbreviation: Ol Grin
- Leader: Moana Carcasses Kalosil
- Founder: Père Gerard Leymang
- Founded: 28 July 2000
- Ideology: Green politics Regional autonomy Decentralisation
- Political position: Centre-left
- Colours: Green
- Slogan: Wan Fasen Blong Divelopmen
- Parliament: 1 / 52
- Port Vila Municipal Council: 2 / 18

Website
- vanuatugrin.com

The Green Confederation (Bislama: Vanuatu Grin Konfederesen, French: Confédération des Verts Vanuatu; sometimes seen as the Greens Confederation or Vanuatu Green Confederation) is a green political party in Vanuatu. At the legislative election of 2008 the party won 2 out of 52 seats, increasing to 3 seats at the election of 2012 with 3.5% of the votes. Its most prominent member is Moana Carcasses Kalosil, former deputy leader of the opposition, former cabinet minister and former Prime Minister of Vanuatu. It was soon joined by two other MPs, increasing its numbers to five. In the 2025 election, only one Green Confederation MP was elected, Kalosil's wife Marie Louise Milne. Following the election she changed her party affiliation to the Iauko Group in accordance with the results of the 2024 Vanuatuan constitutional referendum

== Election results ==
Parliament
Election	Leader	Votes	%	Seats	+/–	Government
2002	Gérard Leymang	3,071	4.68 (#7)	2 / 52	New	Opposition
2004	Amos Andeng	7,075	7.67 (#4)	3 / 52	▲1	Coalition
2008	Moana Carcasses Kalosil	3,619	3.44 (#6)	2 / 52	▼1	Coalition
2012	Moana Carcasses Kalosil	4,219	3.51 (#9)	3 / 52	▲1	Coalition
2016	Moana Carcasses Kalosil	2,851	2.52 (#12)	2 / 52	▼1	Opposition
2020	Moana Carcasses Kalosil	3,623	2.52 (#7)	1 / 52	▼1	Coalition
2022	Moana Carcasses Kalosil	2,346	1.77 (#11)	0 / 52	▼1	Extra-parliamentary
2025	Moana Carcasses Kalosil	2,606	1.78 (#11)	1 / 52	▲1	Opposition

== See also ==
- Green party
- List of environmental organizations
