= National Community Association =

Political party of Vanuatu

The National Community Association (French: Association de la communauté nationale) is a social-liberal and nationalist political party in Vanuatu established in May 1996. Sabi Natonga, a Tannese businessman, was the party's first president. The NCA's platform advocates for socioeconomic reforms, such as decreasing school fees, increasing the Ministry of Youth and Sport's budget, and strengthening women's role in society. In addition, it promotes ethnonationalist policies, including reserving the textiles industry and export of local produce to ni-Vanuatu only. At the elections held on 6 July 2004, the party won 2 out of 52 seats.
