= Vanuatu Republican Party =

- Leader: Maxime Carlot Korman
- Parliamentary Leader: Marcellino Pipite
- Founded: 1998
- Split from: Union of Moderate Parties
- Ideology: Decentralisation; Francophone
- Political position: Centre
- Parliament: 0 / 52

The Vanuatu Republican Party (French: Parti Républicain de Vanuatu, Bislama: Ripablikan Pati blong Vanuatu) is a centrist political party in Vanuatu. The party was founded by Maxime Carlot Korman.

At the last general elections, held on 22 January 2016, they won no seats and 1.75% of the vote. Its leader is Korman, who was previously a member of the Union of Moderate Parties and had served as Prime Minister of Vanuatu while a member of the UMP. Korman and the Republican Party were part of the coalition government led by Ham Lini's National United Party from 2004 to 2008, and Korman served in the cabinet as minister of lands.

Korman left the UMP in the late 1990s after his rival Serge Vohor won a leadership struggle. At the July 6, 2004 elections, the party won 4 of the 52 seats. At the 2008 elections, the Republicans gained 3 seats and became as strong as the UMP, which had been the dominant party in the French-speaking community. In the 2012 elections the Republican Party lost 2 seats, including Korman's. Nonetheless, the party participated in the government, with the party's only MP, Marcellino Pipite, serving as Tourism and Commerce Minister.

Following the 2016 election the party lost its parliamentary representation, and after not contesting the 2020 election it failed to gain it back in the 2022 election.

== Election results ==
=== Parliament ===
Election	Leader	Votes	%	Seats	+/–	Status
1998	Maxime Carlot Korman	5,232	7.59 (#5)	1 / 52	New	Opposition
2002	Maxime Carlot Korman	5,354	6.76 (#5)	3 / 52	▲2	Opposition
2004	Maxime Carlot Korman	4,695	5.09 (#6)	4 / 52	▲1	Coalition
2008	Maxime Carlot Korman	8,155	7.75 (#4)	7 / 52	▲3	Coalition
2012	Maxime Carlot Korman	3,627	3.01 (#10)	1 / 52	▼6	Opposition
2016	Maxime Carlot Korman	1,975	1.75 (#14)	0 / 52	▼1	Extra-parliamentary
2020	Maxime Carlot Korman	Did not contest		0 / 52	0	Extra-parliamentary
2022	Maxime Carlot Korman	557	0.42 (#30)	0 / 52	0	Extra-parliamentary
