= Paul Telukluk =

Vanuatuan politician

Paul Barthelemy Telukluk is a Vanuatuan politician.

In 2000, he was the co-founder, along with Father Gérard Leymang and Vincent Boulekone, of the Green Confederation, to "promote sustainable development balancing custom, the environment, social welfare, free enterprise and regional autonomy for each of the six provinces". In the 2002 general election, he was elected to Parliament as Green MP for Malekula. Within the Green Federation, he was the leader of Namangi Aute, a francophone movement founded in 1975, and committed to decentralisation. Prior to merging with the Greens, Namangi Aute had been merged into the Union of Moderate Parties, and Telukluk had begun his political career as an MP for the UPM. Shortly after being elected to Parliament as a Green, however, he left the Confederation and re-established Namangi Aute as an independent party. He was re-elected as MP for Malekula in the 2004 and 2008 general elections, being Namangi Aute's sole Member of Parliament on both occasions.

In the mid-1990s, Telukluk served as Minister for Lands in Prime Minister Maxime Carlot Korman's government. Later, he was investigated by the Ombudsman's office, which in 1999 published a report accusing him of having mismanaged the sale of deportees' properties. The report recommended that Telukluk "should not be considered for a ministerial portfolio in any future Government".

Telukluk served as Minister for Energy, Lands and Natural Resources under Prime Minister Ham Lini in the mid-2000s. As such he considered the use of solar energy and coconut oil to help provide electricity to a greater number of people in the country. He also looked into the possibility of mining offshore natural mineral resources.

In December 2010, when Sato Kilman replaced Edward Natapei as prime minister following a motion of no confidence, Telukluk joined Kilman's coalition government, and was appointed Minister for Lands and Natural Resources. Less than a week later, he was removed from Cabinet in a reshuffle aimed at consolidating the new government's majority by offering Cabinet posts to new coalition allies.

On 24 April 2011, Kilman was himself ousted in a motion of no confidence, and succeeded by Serge Vohor. Vohor appointed Telukluk as Minister for Ni-Vanuatu (i.e., indigenous) Business. Three weeks later, however, Vohor's election and premiership were voided by the Court of Appeal, and Telukluk lost his position in government. On 16 June, Kilman's election and premiership were themselves voided by the Supreme Court, on constitutional grounds, and previous Prime Minister Edward Natapei became caretaker prime minister until a new leader could be elected. Telukluk was restored as caretaker Minister for Ni-Vanuatu Business. On 26 June, Sato Kilman was elected prime minister by Parliament, with twenty-nine votes to Serge Vohor's twenty-three, thus beginning his first lawfully recognised term as prime minister. He reinstated his previous Cabinet, and Telukluk once more lost his position in government.

On 23 March 2013, there was a new change of government, with Moana Carcasses Kalosil (of the Green Confederation) becoming prime minister. On 26 February 2014, facing defections to the Opposition, Carcasses offered Cabinet positions to Opposition MPs, so as to shore up his parliamentary majority. Telukluk (now a member of the Reunification of Moderate Parties) was one of those who defected to Carcasses' government for a Cabinet job; he was appointed Minister for Internal Affairs, replacing Christophe Emmelee, who was reshuffled to the position of Minister for Justice. Telukluk lost office when the Carcasses government was brought down by a motion of no confidence on 15 May 2014.

In June 2015, following a further change of government, Telukluk became Minister for Lands in the government of Sato Kilman. In October 2015, Telukluk, together with several other MPs, was convicted of bribery by the Vanuatu Supreme Court. Telukluk was found to have accepted 1,000,000 vatu from Moana Carcasses MP, in return for support in the motion of no-confidence that brought the Kilman government to power.
