= National United Party (Vanuatu) =

- Abbreviation: NUP
- Leader: Ham Lini
- Founders: Walter Lini; Đinh Văn Thân
- Founded: 6 September 1991
- Split from: Vanua'aku Party
- Ideology: Social democracy Christian democracy Anglophone interests Vanuatuan nationalism Decentralisation
- Political position: Centre-left
- Colours: Black; Green; Yellow; Red
- Parliament: 1 / 52
- Port Vila Municipal Council: 0 / 18

Party flag

Website
- Facebook page

The National United Party (NUP, generally pronounced noop) is a political party in Vanuatu. It was founded by Vanuatu's independence leader Walter Lini when he broke away from the Vanua'aku Pati, alongside businessman Đinh Văn Thân. It is a social democratic party which traditionally received most of its support from English speakers.

In 1991, Walter Lini, who had served as prime minister of Vanuatu for 12 years as a member of the Vanua'aku Pati and lost his position after a split in the party, founded the National United Party, soon becoming its leader. Following Walter's death in 1999, his brother Ham Lini became party leader. The party became one of the largest political parties in Vanuatu along with the Vanua'aku Party and the Union of Moderate Parties, and participated in coalitions with both at various times. In the July 2004 elections, the party won 10 of the 52 seats, and because of losses by the other major parties, it became the largest single party in Parliament. In December 2004, Ham Lini became prime minister, the first member of NUP to take this position while a member of the party. At the 2008 elections, the NUP lost 2 seats, and received a total of 8 seats in Parliament, becoming the second largest party. Ham Lini was not able to form another government, but the National United Party became an important coalition partner in the new government formed by the Vanua'aku Party.

After the 2012 elections NUP remained in coalition with the People's Progress Party in the Kilman government. The party went into opposition upon the election of Moana Carcasses as prime minister in 2013. It returned to government in 2014 when a motion of no confidence brought the government of Joe Natuman to power, with Ham Lini as deputy prime minister, then returned to opposition in 2015 during the Sato Kilman government.

Although untarnished by the bribery scandal that brought down Kilman's government, NUP won only 4 seats in the subsequent general election, 3 of them on Pentecost Island. As a result the party joined a broad coalition in support of Charlot Salwai as prime minister, with Ham Lini as minister for climate change. The party retained its 4 seats in both the 2020 and 2022 elections, joining the government coalitions that emerged in both cases. The NUP fell to one seat in the 2025 election and its sole MP Maty Lange was forced to switch his affiliation to a larger party in accordance with the results of the 2024 Vanuatuan constitutional referendum, choosing to move to the Leaders Party of Vanuatu.

== Election results ==
=== Parliament ===
Election	Leader	Votes	%	Seats	+/–	Government
1991	Walter Lini	12,672	20.38 (#3)	10 / 46	New	Coalition
1995	Walter Lini	17,795	23.41 (#3)	9 / 50	▼1	Coalition
1998	Walter Lini	10,947	15.87 (#3)	11 / 52	▲2	Coalition
2002	Ham Lini	10,667	13.48 (#3)	8 / 52	▼3	Coalition
2004	Ham Lini	9,418	10.21 (#3)	10 / 52	▲2	Coalition
2008	Ham Lini	12,249	11.64 (#2)	8 / 52	▼2	Coalition
2012	Ham Lini	7,456	6.20 (#4)	4 / 52	▼4	Coalition
2016	Ham Lini	6,196	5.48 (#4)	4 / 52	0	Coalition
2020	Ham Lini	5,377	3.73 (#6)	4 / 52	0	Coalition
2022	Ham Lini	5,040	3.81 (#8)	4 / 52	0	Coalition
2025	Ham Lini	3,578	2.45 (#8)	1 / 52	▼3	Opposition

== See also ==
- Dinh Van Than, businessman and close friend of Walter Lini's, who was instrumental in the launching of the party
