= Isabelle Donald =

Vanuatu politician (born 1966)

Isabelle Donald (born 23 November 1966) is a politician from Epi Island in Vanuatu. She has served two elected terms, from 2002-2005 and 2005-2008.

Donald attended Onesua High School from 1980 to 1983, followed by a year at Malapoa College, where she studied typing and administration. From 1984 to 1992 Donald worked for the Epi local government. In 1993 she moved to work at the Ministry of Agriculture and became involved with the Rural Skills Training Program, where she stayed until standing in the parliamentary election in 2002.

When Donald was elected to the Parliament of Vanuatu in May 2002 she became the third woman to serve there. She was also appointed deputy speaker of the house in the same year, a position she held until 2004.

From 2004-06, her party was in government, and Donald was appointed the Minister of the Comprehensive Reform Programme, Women's and Children's Affairs. From 2006-07, she was Minister of Justice and Social Welfare.

== Recognition ==
In 2005 chiefs in the eastern part of Epi Island bestowed her with the high ranking customary title “Sikawonuta” (the greatest woman).
