= Barak Sopé =

Prime Minister of Vanuatu from 1999 to 2001

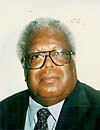
- Sope in 2000

5th Prime Minister of Vanuatu
- In office 25 November 1999 – 13 April 2001
- President: John Bani
- Preceded by: Donald Kalpokas
- Succeeded by: Edward Natapei

Personal details
- Born: 1950 (age 74–75)
- Political party: Melanesian Progressive Party
- Spouse: Mildred Sopé

Barak Tame Sopé Mautamata (born 13 August 1950) is a ni-Vanuatu politician. He was the leader of the Melanesian Progressive Party and was, until 2008, a member of the Vanuatu parliament from the island of Efate. He was the Prime Minister of Vanuatu from 1999 until 2001, when he was deposed by Parliament in a no confidence vote.

Sopé was Minister of Finance in 1996. He was elected Prime Minister in a parliamentary vote on 25 November 1999, receiving 28 votes against 24 for Edward Natapei. Shortly after he was deposed on 13 April 2001, he was convicted on 2 charges of forging several million US dollars' worth of Vanuatu Government Guarantees and was sentenced in July 2002 to 3 years on each charge (to be served concurrently), but was pardoned in 2003 despite heavy opposition from Australia and New Zealand. When the coalition government of Serge Vohor was sworn in on 29 July 2004, Sopé became Minister of Foreign Affairs. He lost that position in November 2004 after he spoke out against Vanuatu's attempts to establish diplomatic relations with Taiwan, reputedly due to his own dealings with the Chinese. He returned to the cabinet in December 2004 when the government of Ham Lini took office, taking up the post of Minister of Agriculture, Forestry and Fisheries.

In the September 2008 general election, Sopé lost his seat in Parliament.

In September 2014, Sopé was a candidate in the indirect presidential elections. He was eventually defeated in the eighth round of voting by Baldwin Lonsdale.
