= Ham Lin̄i =

Prime Minister of Vanuatu from 2004 to 2008

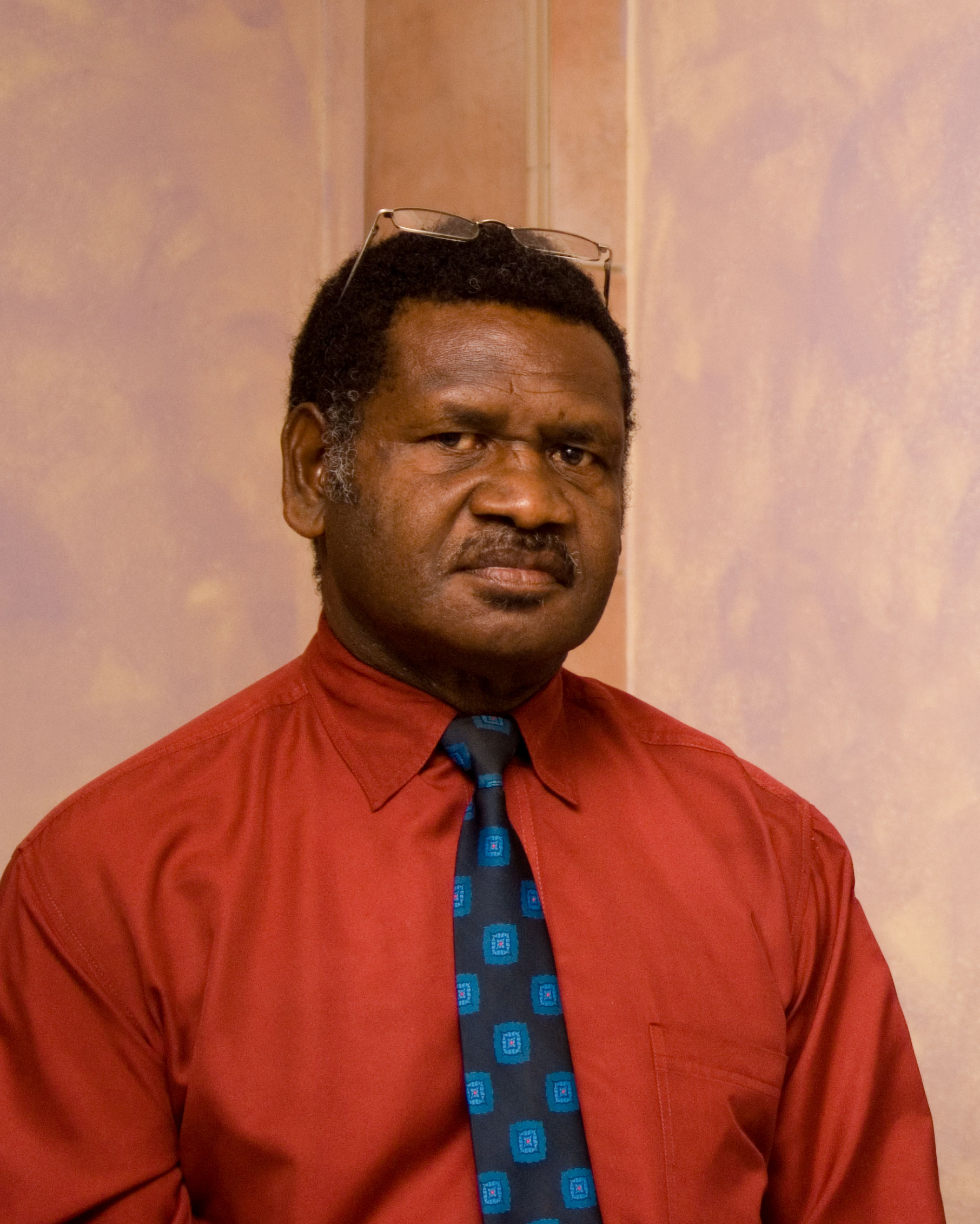
- Lin̄i in 2008

Prime Minister of Vanuatu
- In office 11 December 2004 – 22 September 2008
- President: Kalkot Mataskelekele
- Deputy: Edward Natapei
- Preceded by: Serge Vohor
- Succeeded by: Edward Natapei
- Constituency: Pentecost, Penama

Personal details
- Born: 8 December 1951 Pentecost, New Hebrides
- Died: 10 November 2025 (aged 73) Port Vila, Vanuatu
- Political party: VNUP
- Spouse: Ruth Lin̄i
- Relations: Walter Lini (brother)

Ham Lin̄i Vanuaroroa (8 December 1951 – 10 November 2025) was a ni-Vanuatu politician. He was a MP from Pentecost Island in Penama Province. He was Prime Minister of Vanuatu from 11 December 2004 until 22 September 2008. He was the Deputy Prime Minister, having assumed the post on 16 May 2014.

Lin̄i was the brother of Walter Lin̄i, one of the founders of the modern Republic of Vanuatu. Ham Lin̄i was the leader of the National United Party (VNUP).

== Prime Minister of Vanuatu ==
The VNUP became the largest party in parliament in the July 2004 parliamentary elections, with 10 of 52 seats. Ham Lin̄i became a candidate for prime minister, but was defeated by Serge Vohor, though Lin̄i also had the support of the largest faction of the Vanua'aku Pati, led by outgoing Prime Minister Edward Natapei. He continued to dispute the results and lead the opposition to the Vohor government until 20 August 2004, when Vohor and Lin̄i formed a National Unity Government, in which Vohor remained prime minister and Lin̄i became deputy prime minister and minister of internal affairs.

In December 2004, Vohor was ousted after only a few months in office in a no confidence vote for unilaterally establishing relations with Taiwan (Republic of China), and Lin̄i was elected Prime Minister by the Parliament. One of Lin̄i's first actions after taking office was the re-establishment of full diplomatic relations with the People's Republic of China.

On 21 March 2006, Lin̄i survived a no confidence vote in Parliament by a vote of 30 to 20. The opposition, led by former prime minister Serge Vohor, had accused the Lin̄i government of weaknesses from a controversial proposal to monopolize kava exports. The Opposition had believed that some parliament members who had supported the government would defect, but few did.

Lin̄i and Vanuatu's council of ministers declared a state of emergency for the capital city of Port Vila in March 2007 following tribal clashes between people from the islands of Tanna and Ambrym. The clashes, which took place in Blacksands squatter settlement area on the outskirts of Port Vila, killed two people. The fighting broke out when people from Tanna alleged that an Ambrym man used black magic to harm a Tannese person.

== Subsequent political career ==
Lin̄i failed to gain a second term as prime minister after his National United Party suffered losses in Parliament during the general election held on 2 September 2008, although he was re-elected to his own parliamentary seat. Edward Natapei of the Vanuaku Pati narrowly defeated his nearest opponent, Maxime Carlot Korman, leader of the Vanuatu Republican Party, with 27 to 25 votes in Parliament in a vote three weeks later on 22 September, succeeding Lin̄i as prime minister.

Natapei pledged to continue many of Lin̄i's policies and incorporate them in his new government. These included anti-corruption measures, transparency, political stability and good governance. Natapei named Lin̄i to his cabinet as Minister of Infrastructure and Public Utilities on 22 September 2008.

In Natapei's first reshuffle Lin̄i was given the post of Minister of Justice & Social Welfare whilst remaining as Deputy Prime Minister. However, in Natapei's second major cabinet reshuffle, which took place in November 2009, Lin̄i was removed as Deputy Prime Minister and replaced by Sato Kilman. Natapei had learned that Lin̄i's Vanuatu National United Party and the Vanuatu Republican Party were planning a vote of no confidence measure against him. In response to the no confidence plan, Natapei sacked half his cabinet members, including Lin̄i, and removed the Vanuatu National United Party and the Vanuatu Republican Party from his cabinet, replacing them with sixteen members of the opposition.

Ham Lin̄i returned to government when Sato Kilman became Prime Minister on 2 December 2010, having ousted Natapei in a parliamentary vote of no confidence. Kilman appointed Lin̄i Deputy Prime Minister, as well as Minister for Trade, Commerce, Industries and Tourism. Lin̄i held the position until 24 April 2011, when Kilman was in turn ousted in turn in a vote of no confidence, and replaced by Serge Vohor. Vohor did not appoint Lin̄i to his cabinet.

Three weeks later, however, on 13 May, Vohor's election and premiership were voided by the Court of Appeal, and the Kilman government was restored, complete with Ham Lin̄i as Deputy Prime Minister. This lasted for only a month; on 16 June, the Kilman premiership was voided on constitutional grounds by the Supreme Court's Chief Justice Vincent Lunabek, and Lin̄i lost office once more. He regained it on 26 June when Kilman was restored as prime minister by Parliament, and reinstated his Cabinet. Kilman's government fell on 21 March 2013 when it lost the confidence of Parliament, and Lin̄i found himself in Opposition to Prime Minister Moana Carcasses Kalosil's new government.

On 15 May 2014, Carcasses was ousted in a motion of no confidence. New prime minister Joe Natuman appointed Lin̄i his deputy prime minister and minister for trade and commerce. Lin̄i lost office on 11 June 2015 when the Natuman government was ousted in a motion of no confidence.

== Death ==
Lin̄i died at a hospital in Port Vila, Vanuatu, on 10 November 2025, at the age of 73.

Political offices
Preceded by Serge Vohor	Prime Minister of Vanuatu; 2004–2008	Succeeded by Edward Natapei
Preceded by ?	Deputy Prime Minister of Vanuatu; 2008–2009	Succeeded by Sato Kilman
Preceded by Sato Kilman	Deputy Prime Minister of Vanuatu; 2009–2011	Succeeded by Joshua Kalsakau
Preceded by Joshua Kalsakau	Deputy Prime Minister of Vanuatu; 2011	Succeeded by Sato Kilman (interim)
Preceded by none (for a few days)	Deputy Prime Minister of Vanuatu; 2011	Succeeded by incumbent
