= Melanesian Progressive Party =

- Leader: Esmon Saimon
- Founder: Barak Sopé
- Founded: 1988
- Ideology: Social democracy Autonomism; Environmentalism
- Political position: Centre-left
- Parliament: 0 / 52

The Melanesian Progressive Party is a political party in Vanuatu formed in 1988 after an internal leadership struggle within the Vanua'aku Pati in the late 1980s. MPP founder, former Prime Minister Barak Sopé, was at that point the secretary general of the VP, and the struggle, as well as his expulsion from the VP and the Parliament for taking part in a protest against the government’s decision to close the Urban Land Corporation (ULC) in April 1988, resulted in him forming the MPP. The party's program is relatively similar to the VP. Despite its small number of seats it has been important in setting up coalition governments since the 1990s.

At the 2012 Vanuatuan general election, the party won 2 out of 52 seats; it lost one of these in the 2016 election.
