= List of members of the Parliament of Vanuatu (2022–2025) =

The 52 members for the 14th Legislature of the Parliament of Vanuatu were elected in a snap election on 13 October 2022. There were two subsequent by-elections, bringing the total number of members elected for this Legislature to 54.

== List of Members ==
Constituency	Member	Party
Ambae	Jay Ngwele	Rural Development Party
Ambae	James Bule	People's Unity Development Party
Ambae	John Still Tari Qetu	National United Party
Ambrym	John Salong	Land and Justice Party
Ambrym	Bruno Leingkone (2022–2024)^{a}	National United Party
Ambrym	Buleban Basile (2024–2025)	National United Party
Banks	Jack Wona	Vanuatu National Development Party
Efate	Norris Jack Kalmet	Reunification Movement for Change
Efate	Jean Baptiste Tama	Independent
Efate	Andrew Samuel Kalpoliep	Union of Moderate Parties
Efate	Gloria Julia King	Union of Moderate Parties
Efate	Luo Jesse	Union of Moderate Parties
Epi	Suele Simeon	Laverwo Movement
Epi	John Nil	Vanuatu Progressive Development Party
Luganville	Ati Marc	Iauko Group
Luganville	Matai Seremaiah	Leaders Party of Vanuatu
Maewo	Ian Wilson	Ngwasoanda Custom Movement
Malekula	Sato Killman	People's Progressive Party
Malekula	Marcellino Barthelemy	Reunification Movement for Change
Malekula	Terry Alick	Land and Justice Party
Malekula	Esmon Saimon	Vanua'aku Pati
Malekula	Sanick Asang (2022–2023)^{b}	National United Party
Malekula	Don Ken Stephen (2023–2025)	People's Progressive Party
Malekula	Gracia Shadrack	Leaders Party of Vanuatu
Malekula	Hymak Anatole	Union of Moderate Parties
Malo–Aore	Wesly Rasu	Vanua'aku Pati
Paama	Andy Job Sam	Leaders Party of Vanuatu
Pentecost	Charlot Salwai	Reunification Movement for Change
Pentecost	Blaise Sumptoh	Rural Development Party
Pentecost	Marc Muelsul	Rural Development Party
Pentecost	Silas Bule	National United Party
Port Vila	Justin Ngwele	Rural Development Party
Port Vila	Ralph Regenvanu	Land and Justice Party
Port Vila	Anthony Iauko	Union of Moderate Parties
Port Vila	Ishmael Kalsakau	Union of Moderate Parties
Port Vila	Ulrich Sumptoh	Reunification Movement for Change
Santo	Mabhe Rick Tchamako	Reunification Movement for Change
Santo	Ati Camillo	Iauko Group
Santo	Samson Samsen	Vanua'aku Pati
Santo	Sakaes Lulu	People's Progressive Party
Santo	Leonard Joshua Pikioune	Nagriamel Movement
Santo	Vari Peter James	Unity for Change Movement
Santo	Gaetan Pikinoune	Vanuatu Liberal Movement
Shepherds	John Timakata	Vanua'aku Pati
Southern Islands	Netvunei Tomker	Leaders Party of Vanuatu
Tanna	Emanuel Xavier Harry	Iauko Group
Tanna	Jothan Napat	Leaders Party of Vanuatu
Tanna	Andrew Solomon Napuat	Land and Justice Party
Tanna	Johnny Koanapo	Vanua'aku Pati
Tanna	Nato Iaanatom Natuman	Union of Moderate Parties
Tanna	Simil Kalptu Johnson Youse	Vanua'aku Pati
Tanna	Bob Loughman	Vanua'aku Pati
Tongoa	John Amos	Namarakieana Movement
Torres	Christophe Emelee	Vanuatu National Development Party
^a Vacated seat due to non-attendance as a result of medical treatment.^b Removed from Parliament due to ineligibility as a result of criminal conviction. Source: Vanuatu Electoral Office
