= List of political parties in Vanuatu =

This article lists political parties in Vanuatu. Vanuatu has a multi-party system with numerous political parties, in which no one party often has a chance of gaining power alone, and parties must work with each other to form coalition governments. Not all parties have a consistent ideology, and of those that do not, most members tend to support the political positions/attitudes of the party leader. Prior to 2024, politicians switching parties several times over the span of a few years was not uncommon. Governments typically comprise coalitions of numerous small parties which change regularly, with parties and MPs "crossing the floor" (although the latter of which was prohibited in 2024), and Prime Ministers being ousted in motions of no confidence has previously occurred several times in one legislative term.

== The parties ==
=== Parties represented in parliament ===
Party	Abbr.	Leader	Political position	Ideology	MPs
Leaders Party of Vanuatu	LPV	Jotham Napat			9 / 52
Eagle Group; Iauko Grup	IG	Marc Ati			8 / 52
My Land Party; Vanua'aku Pati	VP	Johnny Koanapo	Centre-left to left-wing	Melanesian socialism; Vanuatuan nationalism; Anglophone interests	8 / 52
Land and Justice Party; Graon mo Jastis Pati	GJP	Ralph Regenvanu		Land reform; Indigenous rights; Ni-Vanuatu traditionalism	6 / 52
Reunification Movement for Change; Mouvement de réunification pour le changement	RMC	Charlot Salwai	Centre-right	Cultural conservatism; Francophone interests	6 / 52
Union of Moderate Parties; Union des partis moderés	UMP	Ishmael Kalsakau	Centre-right	Liberal conservatism; Decentralisation; Francophone interests	6 / 52
Rural Development Party	RDP	Jay Ngwele		Agrarianism	6 / 52

=== Other parties ===
- Friend Melanesian Party (FMP)
- Green Confederation (Vanuatu Grin Konfederesen, Ol Grin)
- Melanesian Progressive Party (MPP)
- Nagriamel Movement (Nagriamel)
- National Community Association (Association de la communauté nationale, ACN)
- National United Party (NUP)
- People's Action Party (Parti de l'Action Populaire, PAP)
- People's Progressive Party (PPP)
- People's Unity Development Party (PUDP)
- Vanuatu Labour Party (Vanuatu Leba Pati, VLP)
- Vanuatu Liberal Movement (VLM)
- Vanuatu National Development Party (VNDP)
- Vanuatu Presidential Party (VPP)
- Vanuatu Republican Party (Parti républicain de Vanuatu, PRV)

== See also ==
- Politics of Vanuatu
- Elections in Vanuatu
