= 2022 Vanuatuan general election =

Snap national election

- 13 October 2022
- All 52 seats in Parliament; 27 seats needed for a majority
Party	Leader	Vote %	Seats	+/–
Vanua'aku Pati	Bob Loughman	15.50	7	0
UMP	Ishmael Kalsakau	11.51	7	+2
Rural Development	Jay Ngwele	8.65	4	+2
Land & Justice	Ralph Regenvanu	7.70	4	−5
RMC	Charlot Salwai	7.43	5	−2
Leaders Party	Jothan Napat	7.36	5	0
Iauko	Marc Ati	6.12	3	+1
National United	Ham Lini	3.81	4	+2
Nagriamel	Keasipai Song	2.45	1	0
People's Progressive	Sato Kilman	2.43	2	+1
PUDP		1.41	1	0
National Development	Christophe Emelee	1.23	2	+1
Laverwo Movement		1.00	1	New
Progressive Development		1.00	1	0
UCM		0.77	1	New
Liberal Movement	Gaetan Pikinoune	0.76	1	0
NCM		0.66	1	+1
Namarakieana Movement		0.64	1	New
Independents		9.04	1	+1
This lists parties that won seats. See the complete results below.
Prime Minister before	Prime Minister after
Bob Loughman; Vanua'aku Pati	Ishmael Kalsakau; UMP

Snap general elections were held in Vanuatu on 13 October 2022 to elect all 52 seats in Parliament. President Nikenike Vurobaravu dissolved Parliament in August 2022 on advice of the Council of Ministers ahead of a no-confidence vote against Prime Minister Bob Loughman.

== Background ==
On 18 August 2022 the new president dissolved Parliament midway through the parliamentary term at the request of Prime Minister Bob Loughman, who requested the dissolution to avoid a no confidence vote. The motion sparked criticism from the opposition, with opposition leader Ralph Regenvanu announcing that the opposing parties would contest the dissolution in court.

== Electoral system ==
The 52 members of Parliament were elected for four years terms by single non-transferable vote in eighteen constituencies, ten of which were multi-member constituencies of between two and seven seats, while the remaining eight were single-member constituencies in which the vote takes the form of a first-past-the-post system.

== Results ==
Party	Votes	%	Seats	+/–
Vanua'aku Pati	20,511	15.50	7	0
Union of Moderate Parties	15,223	11.51	7	+2
Rural Development Party	11,451	8.65	4	+2
Land and Justice Party	10,183	7.70	4	–5
Reunification Movement for Change	9,830	7.43	5	–2
Leaders Party of Vanuatu	9,736	7.36	5	0
Iauko Group	8,093	6.12	3	+1
National United Party	5,040	3.81	4	0
Nagriamel Movement	3,240	2.45	1	0
People's Progressive Party	3,221	2.43	2	+1
Green Confederation	2,346	1.77	0	–1
People's Unity Development Party	1,864	1.41	1	0
Vanuatu National Development Party	1,624	1.23	2	+1
Pikinini Blong Kraon	1,334	1.01	0	New
Laverwo Movement	1,320	1.00	1	New
Vanuatu Progressive Development Party	1,318	1.00	1	0
Vanuatu Presidential Party	1,119	0.85	0	0
Vemarana	1,038	0.78	0	–1
Unity for Change Movement	1,020	0.77	1	New
Vanuatu Liberal Movement	1,002	0.76	1	0
Vanuatu New Nation Party	886	0.67	0	0
Ngwasoanda Custom Movement	868	0.66	1	0
Namarakieana Movement	842	0.64	1	New
Liswin	763	0.58	0	New
The People's Party	732	0.55	0	0
Vanuatu Community Movement	714	0.54	0	0
People's Services Party	672	0.51	0	New
Pentecost Aelan Kastom Movement	586	0.44	0	New
Oceania Transformation Movement	583	0.44	0	0
Vanuatu Republican Party	557	0.42	0	0
Upi Nafzan Iskei	445	0.34	0	0
Vanuatu Cultural Self Reliant Movement	398	0.30	0	–1
United Movements for Vanuatu People	315	0.24	0	0
Divine Freedom Alliance Party	302	0.23	0	New
Wan Nakamal	240	0.18	0	New
Friend Melanesian Party	229	0.17	0	0
Vanuatu Progressive Republican Farmer Party	197	0.15	0	0
North to South United Party	190	0.14	0	New
Shepherds Alliance Party	138	0.10	0	0
Liberal Democratic Party	81	0.06	0	New
Shepherd Sea Eagles Alliance	49	0.04	0	New
Household Prosperity Party	34	0.03	0	New
Movement for Righteousness, Peace and Justice	16	0.01	0	New
Imaim	4	0.00	0	New
Independents	11,958	9.04	1	+1
Total	132,312	100.00	52	0
Valid votes	132,312	99.13		
Invalid/blank votes	1,155	0.87		
Total votes	133,467	100.00		
Registered voters/turnout	302,258	44.16		
Source: Vanuatu Electoral Office

=== By constituency ===
Ambae
Candidate	Party	Votes	%
Jay Ngwele	Rural Development Party	996	24.57
James Bule	People's Unity Development Party	588	14.51
John Still Tari Qetu	National United Party	521	12.85
Howard Aru	Vanua'aku Pati	501	12.36
Samuel Garae Virakwahe	Nagriamel	501	12.36
Alban Garae	Rural Development Party	482	11.89
Paulson Garae Ala	Land and Justice Party	381	9.40
Tari Richard Mera Liliu	Pikinini Blong Kraon Movement	83	2.05
Total		4,053	100.00
Valid votes		4,053	99.29
Invalid/blank votes		29	0.71
Total votes		4,082	100.00
Registered voters/turnout		11,167	36.55

Ambrym
Candidate	Party	Votes	%
John Salong	Land and Justice Party	964	24.83
Bruno Leingkone	National United Party	915	23.57
Willie Tirian Abuit	Vanua'aku Pati	766	19.73
Bong Jean-Alain	Reunification Movement for Change	636	16.38
Yeovye Elie Sagan	Union of Moderate Parties	446	11.49
Joshua Bong	Leaders Party of Vanuatu	155	3.99
Total		3,882	100.00
Valid votes		3,882	99.36
Invalid/blank votes		25	0.64
Total votes		3,907	100.00
Registered voters/turnout		8,435	46.32

Banks
Candidate	Party	Votes	%
Jack Wona	Vanuatu National Development Party	904	27.41
Danny Silas	Leaders Party of Vanuatu	876	26.56
Shadrack Welegtabit	Land and Justice Party	753	22.83
Victor Gesul Wetias	Rural Development Party	558	16.92
Din Frankie Field	Vanua'aku Pati	110	3.34
Nixon Fanai	Independent	97	2.94
Total		3,298	100.00
Valid votes		3,298	98.77
Invalid/blank votes		41	1.23
Total votes		3,339	100.00
Registered voters/turnout		5,981	55.83

Efate
Candidate	Party	Votes	%
Norris Jack Kalmet	Reunification Movement for Change	1,837	9.56
Jean Baptist Tama	Independent	1,782	9.27
Andrew Samuel Kalpoilep	Union of Moderate Parties	1,767	9.19
Gloria Julia King	Union of Moderate Parties	1,618	8.42
Luo Jesse	Union of Moderate Parties	1,533	7.98
Fred Lui Samuel	Vanua'aku Pati	1,340	6.97
Eric Iani	Iauko Group	1,179	6.13
Benson Clerance Kanas	Leaders Party of Vanuatu	1,077	5.60
Gillon William Kalotiti	Land and Justice Party	966	5.03
Bakoa Kaltonga	Vanua'aku Pati	913	4.75
Joshua Tafura Kalsakau	Rural Development Party	897	4.67
Lionel Kalwat	The People's Party	732	3.81
Malas Junior Metovao	Vanuatu New Nation Party	704	3.66
Kalmer Kalwatman	Vanua'aku Pati	529	2.75
John Mark Ruben Tarisong	Vanua'aku Pati	485	2.52
Kaltak Ghislain	Upi Nafzan Iskei	445	2.32
Morrison Frank Robert	Green Confederation	369	1.92
Graham Jack Takalo	Independent	324	1.69
Alick Kalmelu Motoutorua	Independent	229	1.19
David Woka Daniel	Independent	226	1.18
Jean Pierre Serel	National United Party	113	0.59
Paul Tabinok Ruvurup	Independent	85	0.44
Iven Marafi	Divine Freedom Alliance Party	71	0.37
Total		19,221	100.00
Valid votes		19,221	98.98
Invalid/blank votes		198	1.02
Total votes		19,419	100.00
Registered voters/turnout		46,888	41.42

Epi
Candidate	Party	Votes	%
Seule Simeon	Laverwo Movement	778	20.89
John Nil	Vanuatu Progressive Development Party	688	18.47
Robert Bohn Sikol	Vanuatu Progressive Development Party	630	16.92
Omawa Mael	Independent	590	15.84
Marcel Yona	Land and Justice Party	423	11.36
Eric Moses Daniel	Vanua'aku Pati	342	9.18
John Isaac	Reunification Movement for Change	271	7.28
Okis Fred Abed	Wan Nakamal	2	0.05
Total		3,724	100.00
Valid votes		3,724	98.75
Invalid/blank votes		47	1.25
Total votes		3,771	100.00
Registered voters/turnout		6,807	55.40

Luganville
Candidate	Party	Votes	%
Ati Marc	Iauko Group	2,394	39.81
Matai Seremaiah	Leaders Party of Vanuatu	1,209	20.10
Eric John Tahun	Vanua'aku Pati	782	13.00
Boe Pedro	Nagriamel	460	7.65
Gary Mahina	National United Party	375	6.24
Jimmy Solomon Viradiu	Pikinini Blong Kraon Movement	226	3.76
Donald Restuetune	Union of Moderate Parties	224	3.72
Kalmet Kasso	Reunification Movement for Change	182	3.03
Marisan Leiwia Pierre	Independent	162	2.69
Total		6,014	100.00
Valid votes		6,014	98.95
Invalid/blank votes		64	1.05
Total votes		6,078	100.00
Registered voters/turnout		18,018	33.73

Maewo
Candidate	Party	Votes	%
Ian Wilson	Ngwasoanda Custom Movement	868	41.53
Reynolds Boeson Boeleguriega	Vanua'aku Pati	516	24.69
Silli Manaseh	Independent	294	14.07
Vanessa Molisa	Laverwo Movement	268	12.82
Mickney Aruwai Natu	Rural Development Party	144	6.89
Total		2,090	100.00
Valid votes		2,090	97.89
Invalid/blank votes		45	2.11
Total votes		2,135	100.00
Registered voters/turnout		3,438	62.10

Malekula
Candidate	Party	Votes	%
Sato Kilman	People's Progressive Party	1,310	8.53
Marcellino Barthelemy	Reunification Movement for Change	1,303	8.49
Terry Alick	Land and Justice Party	873	5.69
Esmon Saimon	Vanua'aku Pati	848	5.52
Sanick Asang	National United Party	803	5.23
Gracia Shadrack	Leaders Party of Vanuatu	760	4.95
Hymak Anatole	Union of Moderate Parties	726	4.73
Fabian Gary Hanhabat Vinbel	Vanua'aku Pati	691	4.50
Gregoire Nimbtik	Vanua'aku Pati	684	4.45
Micah Oliver	Rural Development Party	674	4.39
Don Ken Stephen	People's Services Party	672	4.38
Jerety Johnety	Independent	661	4.31
Louis Kalnpel	Vanuatu Presidential Party	645	4.20
Tony Masaeu Ata	People's Progressive Party	638	4.16
Celine Bareus	Independent	625	4.07
Timothy Aimbong	Independent	593	3.86
Karlos Karlie	Independent	493	3.21
Paul Paclo	Land and Justice Party	439	2.86
Francois Batick	Reunification Movement for Change	409	2.66
Willy Melteras	Iauko Group	285	1.86
Edmond Julun	Laverwo Movement	274	1.78
Kalo Malres	Independent	257	1.67
Alfred Rolland	Land and Justice Party	239	1.56
Apia Nawenorgoth	People's Unity Development Party	143	0.93
Diego Werssets	Pikinini Blong Kraon Movement	142	0.92
Jeneck Patunvanu	Nagriamel	141	0.92
Apia Willie Masing	Wan Nakamal	26	0.17
Total		15,354	100.00
Valid votes		15,354	99.33
Invalid/blank votes		104	0.67
Total votes		15,458	100.00
Registered voters/turnout		28,307	54.61

Malo–Aore
Candidate	Party	Votes	%
Wesly Rasu	Vanua'aku Pati	1,052	43.36
Frazer Moli	Union of Moderate Parties	493	20.32
Nelson Shem	Leaders Party of Vanuatu	343	14.14
Moulin Dehinavanua Tabouti	Land and Justice Party	309	12.74
Lele Petelo	Vanuatu New Nation Party	182	7.50
Michael Kalmet	Independent	47	1.94
Total		2,426	100.00
Valid votes		2,426	99.18
Invalid/blank votes		20	0.82
Total votes		2,446	100.00
Registered voters/turnout		5,134	47.64

Paama
Candidate	Party	Votes	%
Andy Job Sam	Leaders Party of Vanuatu	244	33.61
Mailalong Nos Terry	Vanua'aku Pati	228	31.40
William Fred Tasso	Iauko Group	112	15.43
Jonas James	Union of Moderate Parties	81	11.16
Billy Maki	Reunification Movement for Change	31	4.27
Assion Mahit Sali	Rural Development Party	19	2.62
Stanley Josephat Demis Lango	Wan Nakamal	6	0.83
David Joel	Independent	5	0.69
Total		726	100.00
Valid votes		726	98.91
Invalid/blank votes		8	1.09
Total votes		734	100.00
Registered voters/turnout		1,543	47.57

Pentecost
Candidate	Party	Votes	%
Charlot Salwai	Reunification Movement for Change	1,455	15.71
Blaise Sumptoh	Rural Development Party	1,084	11.70
Marc Muelsul	Rural Development Party	1,055	11.39
Silas Bule	National United Party	820	8.85
Maty Phen Lange	Rural Development Party	733	7.91
Norbert Sumsum Tawal	Oceania Transformation Movement	583	6.29
George Baddeley Bogiri	Leaders Party of Vanuatu	523	5.65
Jean Baptist Saka Saltukro	People's Unity Development Party	436	4.71
Richard Walsh Mahuri Leona	Vanuatu Cultural Self Reliant Movement	398	4.30
Ham Lini	Pentecost Aelan Kastom Movement	388	4.19
Francois Xavier Chani Tabisalsal	Independent	385	4.16
Boe Reve Ephraim	Vanua'aku Pati	369	3.98
Jean Paul Virelala	Union of Moderate Parties	244	2.63
Bob Buleuru	Divine Freedom Alliance Party	231	2.49
Tony Nari	Pentecost Aelan Kastom Movement	198	2.14
JohnJudah Garoleo	Independent	133	1.44
George Toa Anderson	National United Party	101	1.09
John Dick Tabilepo	Vemarana Federation Custom Movement	92	0.99
Thompson Liu	Household Prosperity Party	34	0.37
Total		9,262	100.00
Valid votes		9,262	99.21
Invalid/blank votes		74	0.79
Total votes		9,336	100.00
Registered voters/turnout		18,155	51.42

Port Vila
Candidate	Party	Votes	%
Justin Ngwele	Rural Development Party	2,171	12.91
Ralph Regenvanu	Land and Justice Party	2,115	12.57
Anthony Iauko	Union of Moderate Parties	1,578	9.38
Ishmael Kalsakau	Union of Moderate Parties	1,516	9.01
Ulrich Sumptoh	Reunification Movement for Change	1,342	7.98
Kenneth Natapei	Vanua'aku Pati	1,174	6.98
Moana Carcasses Kalosil	Green Confederation	963	5.72
Natonga Saby	Union of Moderate Parties	892	5.30
James Tari	Independent	804	4.78
Felix Stephen Dorrick	Leaders Party of Vanuatu	723	4.30
Sam Firi	Independent	477	2.84
Sowany Joseph Matou	National United Party	404	2.40
Lui Doresday Kenneth	Independent	375	2.23
Nadia Kanegai	Independent	331	1.97
Hocten Paul	United Movements for Vanuatu People	315	1.87
Donald Benjamin Abiut	Namarakieana Movement	274	1.63
Hezekiah Loli Bodan Vanu	Independent	266	1.58
Etul Olivier	Pikinini Blong Kraon Movement	229	1.36
Christopher Joseph Kernot	Wan Nakamal	206	1.22
Lopez Adams	Independent	143	0.85
Morris Tom Kaloran	Shepherd Alliance Party	138	0.82
Hilton Dunstan	People's Progressive Party	115	0.68
Willie Jimmy	Liberal Democratic Party	81	0.48
Evelyne Utissets	Independent	66	0.39
Joseph Bani Togagi	People's Unity Development Party	50	0.30
Joel Jeff Patunvanu	Nagriamel	45	0.27
Jacques Gedeon Taritong	Independent	28	0.17
Total		16,821	100.00
Valid votes		16,821	99.06
Invalid/blank votes		160	0.94
Total votes		16,981	100.00
Registered voters/turnout		50,151	33.86

Santo
Candidate	Party	Votes	%
Mabhe Rick Tchamako	Reunification Movement for Change	1,900	9.04
Ati Camillo	Iauko Group	1,764	8.39
Samson Samsen	Vanua'aku Pati	1,380	6.56
Sakaes Lulu	People's Progressive Party	1,158	5.51
Leonard Joshua Pikioune	Nagriamel	1,134	5.39
Vari Peter James	Unity for Change Movement	1,020	4.85
Gaetan Pikinoune	Vanuatu Liberal Movement	1,002	4.77
Alfred Maoh	Land and Justice Party	974	4.63
Ronald Kay Warsal	Vanua'aku Pati	969	4.61
John Lum	Nagriamel	959	4.56
Stevens Nano Fabiano	Vemarana Federation Custom Movement	946	4.50
Eric Letlet	Vanua'aku Pati	937	4.46
Jean Toa	National United Party	905	4.30
Livo Mele	Vanuatu Community Movement	714	3.40
Urinamoli Wara Wara	Rural Development Party	688	3.27
Serge Vohor	Pikinini Blong Kraon Movement	619	2.94
Marcellino Pipite	Vanuatu Republican Party	557	2.65
George Jacob	People's Unity Development Party	507	2.41
Ravu Breten	Union of Moderate Parties	491	2.34
Sopakum Nako	Vanuatu Presidential Party	474	2.25
Taribagoto Glen Steward	Independent	243	1.16
Edwin Amblus	Friend Melanesian Party	229	1.09
Tiroles Jean Jacques Maliu	Independent	212	1.01
Ravou Akii Kolomoule Jean	Vanuatu Progress Republican Fama	197	0.94
William John Verekon Arme	Leaders Party of Vanuatu	197	0.94
Bororoa Edouard Boulememe	North to South United Party	190	0.90
Antonio Tal	Green Confederation	181	0.86
Arsen Maliu	Union of Moderate Parties	176	0.84
Timothy Ian Pune	Independent	115	0.55
Kolumule Philip Panpan	Independent	89	0.42
Gabriel Voia Lulu	National United Party	83	0.39
Daniel R. M. Molisa	Community Movement for Righteousness, Peace and Justice	16	0.08
Total		21,026	100.00
Valid votes		21,026	99.36
Invalid/blank votes		136	0.64
Total votes		21,162	100.00
Registered voters/turnout		44,101	47.99

Shepherds
Candidate	Party	Votes	%
John Timakata	Vanua'aku Pati	552	62.73
Willie Pakoa Saatearoto	Green Confederation	279	31.70
Harrison Toar L. Vaka Matan	Shepherd Sea Eagles Alliance	49	5.57
Total		880	100.00
Valid votes		880	98.99
Invalid/blank votes		9	1.01
Total votes		889	100.00
Registered voters/turnout		1,495	59.46

Southern Islands
Candidate	Party	Votes	%
Netvunei Tomker	Leaders Party of Vanuatu	1,128	50.45
Shing Benjamin Nepcevanhas	Vanua'aku Pati	599	26.79
Martin David Naling Nilwo	Rural Development Party	509	22.76
Total		2,236	100.00
Valid votes		2,236	98.98
Invalid/blank votes		23	1.02
Total votes		2,259	100.00
Registered voters/turnout		4,613	48.97

Tanna
Candidate	Party	Votes	%
Emanuel Xavier Harry	Iauko Group	2,359	13.08
Jothan Napat	Leaders Party of Vanuatu	2,230	12.37
Andrew Solomon Napuat	Land and Justice Party	1,747	9.69
Johnny Koanapo	Vanua'aku Pati	1,708	9.47
Nako Ianatom Natuman	Union of Moderate Parties	1,380	7.65
Simil Kalptu Johnson Youse	Vanua'aku Pati	1,332	7.39
Bob Loughman	Vanua'aku Pati	1,200	6.66
Robin Kapapa Tom	Union of Moderate Parties	878	4.87
Joe Natuman	Liswin	763	4.23
James Noumeta	Independent	760	4.22
Natonga Collin Jacques	Union of Moderate Parties	725	4.02
Silas Rouard Yatan	Green Confederation	554	3.07
Willie Kapalu	Independent	509	2.82
Thomas Laken	Reunification Movement for Change	464	2.57
Tom Noam	Rural Development Party	454	2.52
Nalau Jeffry Kaut	Independent	434	2.41
John Junior Ierongen	Rural Development Party	376	2.09
Peter Kaoh	Independent	116	0.64
Song Keasipai	Pikinini Blong Kraon Movement	35	0.19
George Iapson	Imaim	4	0.02
Daniel Koman	Independent	2	0.01
Total		18,030	100.00
Valid votes		18,030	99.27
Invalid/blank votes		133	0.73
Total votes		18,163	100.00
Registered voters/turnout		41,945	43.30

Tongoa
Candidate	Party	Votes	%
John Amos	Namarakieana Movement	568	48.80
Willie Daniel Kalo	Union of Moderate Parties	455	39.09
Thomson Pakoa Matokai Kokona	People's Unity Development Party	140	12.03
Maryline. A. Abel	Vanua'aku Pati	1	0.09
Total		1,164	100.00
Valid votes		1,164	99.83
Invalid/blank votes		2	0.17
Total votes		1,166	100.00
Registered voters/turnout		2,647	44.05

Torres
Candidate	Party	Votes	%
Christophe Emelee	Vanuatu National Development Party	720	34.20
John Joseph	Rural Development Party	611	29.03
Hopkins Sawon Dick Olivier	Vanua'aku Pati	503	23.90
Timothy Womai	Leaders Party of Vanuatu	271	12.87
Total		2,105	100.00
Valid votes		2,105	98.27
Invalid/blank votes		37	1.73
Total votes		2,142	100.00
Registered voters/turnout		3,433	62.39

== Aftermath ==
On 4 November Ishmael Kalsakau of the UMP, who has been the Deputy Prime Minister in the previous government, has been approved as Prime Minister after siding with the previous Leader of Opposition, Ralph Regenvanu of the GJP. The parliamentary majority in support of Kalsaku is composed of members from 8 coalition partners: UMP, GJP, LPV, RMC, NUP, VNDP, PPP and LM, for a total of 30 MPs. Vanuatu elected its first woman parliament member in 14 years; Gloria Julia King.

== Subsequent by-elections ==
=== 2023 Malekula by-election ===
Caused by the criminal conviction of incumbent Sanick Asang. Despite this Asang was declared eligible and contested the snap election. The election was held on 7 September 2023.

Candidate	Party	Votes	%
Don Ken Stephen	People's Progressive Party	3,814	31.50
Sanick Asang	National United Party	3,082	25.45
Jerety Johnety	Reunification Movement for Change	2,662	21.99
Fabian Gary Hanhabat Vinbel	Vanua'aku Pati	2,550	21.06
Total		12,108	100.00
Valid votes		12,108	97.46
Invalid/blank votes		315	2.54
Total votes		12,423	100.00
Registered voters/turnout		29,495	42.12
Source: Vanuatu Electoral Office

=== 2024 Ambrym by-election ===
the seat was vacated after Bruno Leingkone (National United Party) missed three consecutive sittings of Parliament while receiving medical treatment in South Korea. The election was held on 14 March 2024.

Candidate	Party	Votes	%
Buleban Basile	National United Party	1,083	30.16
Morris Mawa	Land and Justice Party	921	25.65
Bong Jean Alain Tiomai	Reunification Movement for Change	908	25.29
Yeoye Elie Sagan	Union of Moderate Parties	465	12.95
Simelum Maki Stanley	Vanua'aku Pati	214	5.96
Total		3,591	100.00
Valid votes		3,591	98.82
Invalid/blank votes		43	1.18
Total votes		3,634	100.00
Registered voters/turnout		8,927	40.71
Source: Vanuatu Electoral Office, VBTC LAEF

== See also ==
- List of elections in 2022
- List of political parties in Vanuatu
