= 2024 Vanuatuan constitutional referendum =

A constitutional referendum was held in Vanuatu on 29 May 2024, the first time a referendum has been held in the country. Voters were asked whether they approve of two proposed amendments to the constitution aimed at reducing instability within Parliament. The proposed amendments are accompanied by the passing of legislation regulating the functioning of political parties.

The referendum is mandated by article 86 of the constitution, which requires that any amendments related to the electoral system or parliamentary system must be approved in a national referendum after being passed by parliament. The associated constitutional amendment bill was passed in December 2023 with 47 votes in favour and none against.

The amendments to the constitution included:

- Adding article 17A forcing MPs to vacate their seats if leaving or being excluded by the party under which they were elected.
- Adding article 17B forcing recently elected MPs who are independents or the only elected member of their party to join a larger party within three months of the first parliamentary session or vacate their seat.

Both questions were voted on independently.

== Results ==
Question	For		Against		Invalid/ blank	Total votes	Registered voters	Turnout	Outcome
Question	Votes	%	Votes	%	Invalid/ blank	Total votes	Registered voters	Turnout	Outcome
Article 17A	53,809	59.28	36,968	40.72	3,716	94,493			Approved
Article 17B	52,364	57.98	37,946	42.02	3,582	93,892			Approved
Source: Vanuatu Electoral Office

== Aftermath ==
The new law was applied to MPs following the January 2025 parliamentary election. MPs were given until May 11 to declare their new affiliation. John Amos of the Namarakieana Movement, Ian Wilson of the Ngwasoanda Custom Movement, and Maty Lange of the National United Party joined the Leaders Party of Vanuatu. Marie Louise Milne of the Green Confederation and Robert Bohn Sikol of the Vanuatu Progressive Development Party joined the Iauko Group. John Lum of Nagriamel joined the Land and Justice Party. Independent Gaetan Pikioune joined the Reunification Movement for Change. Seoule Simeon of the Laverwo Party joined the Vanua'aku Pati.

== See also ==
- Crossing the floor
- Party switching
