= Port Vila =

Capital and largest city of Vanuatu

Port Vila Vila
- City
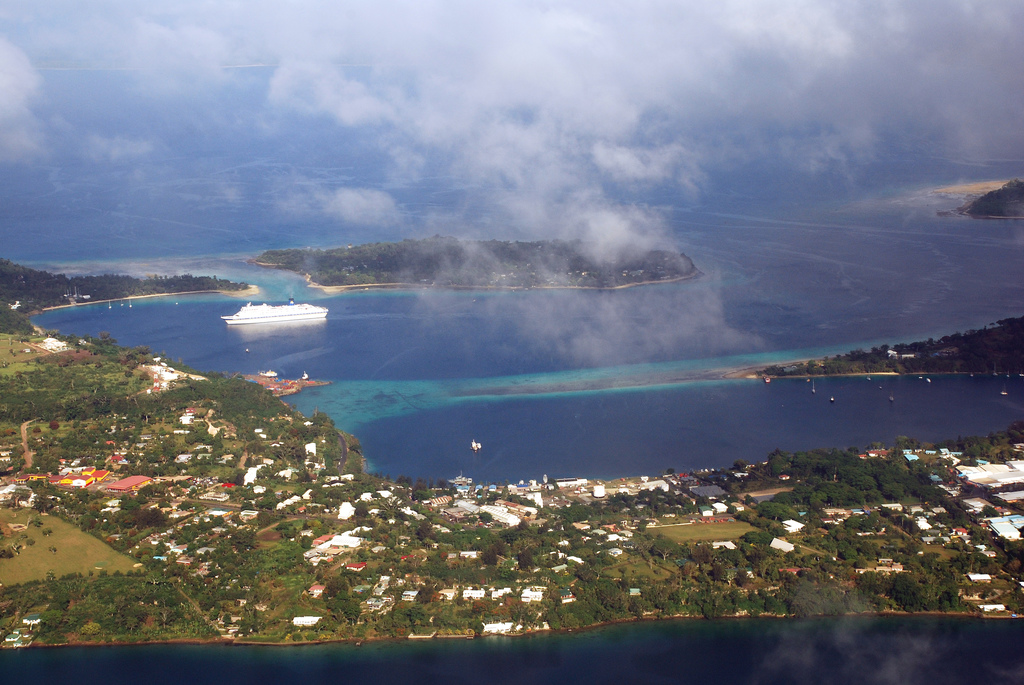
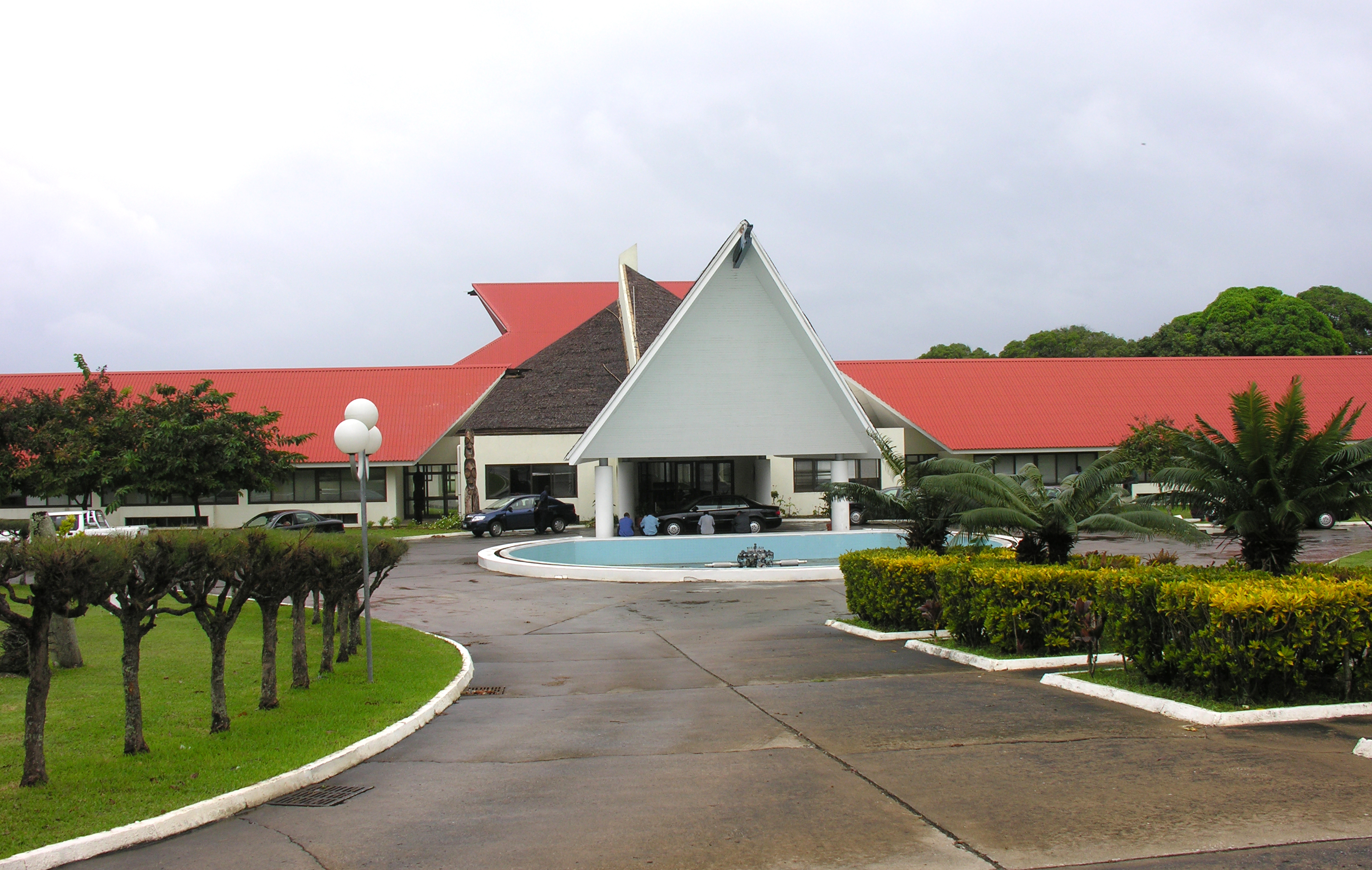
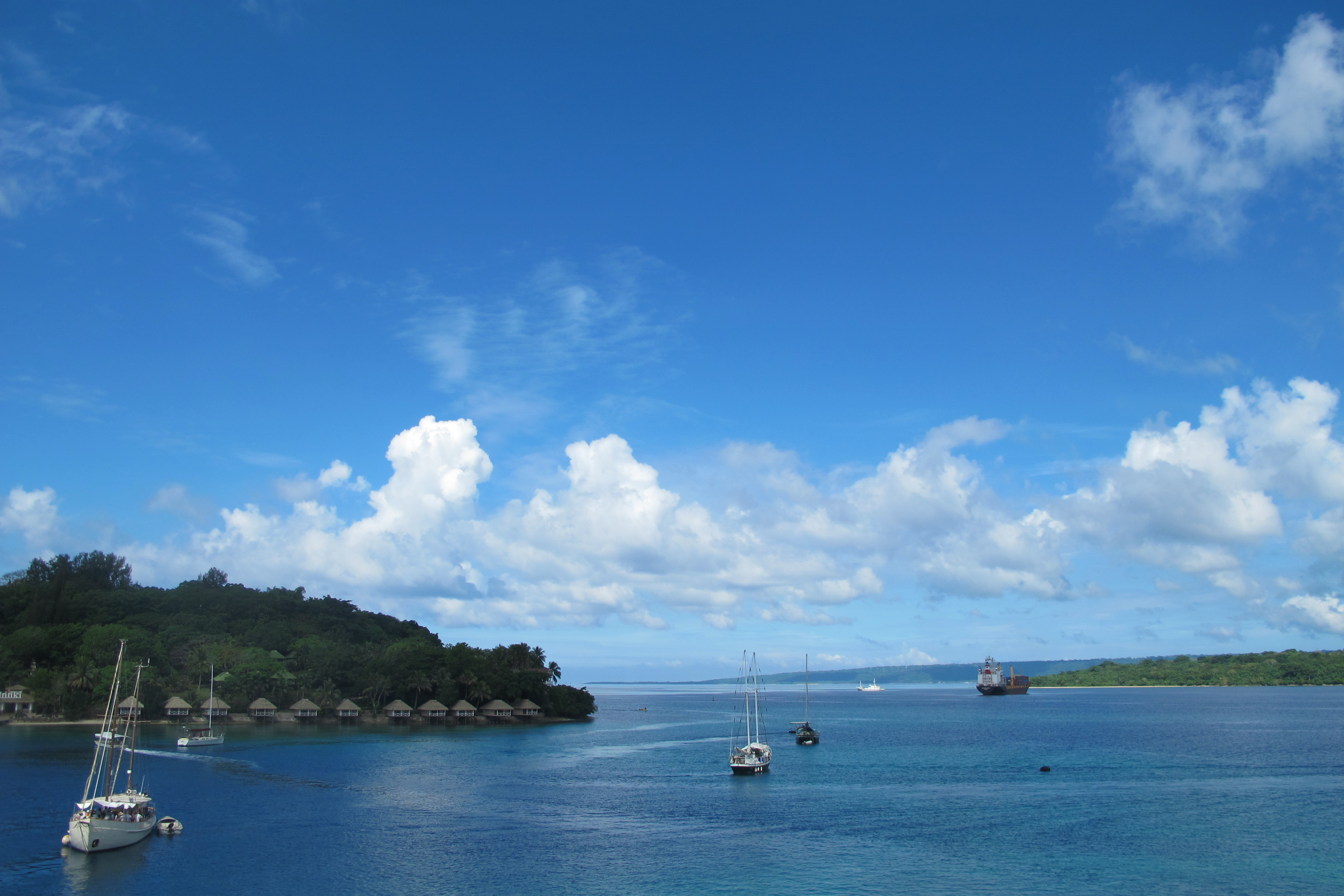
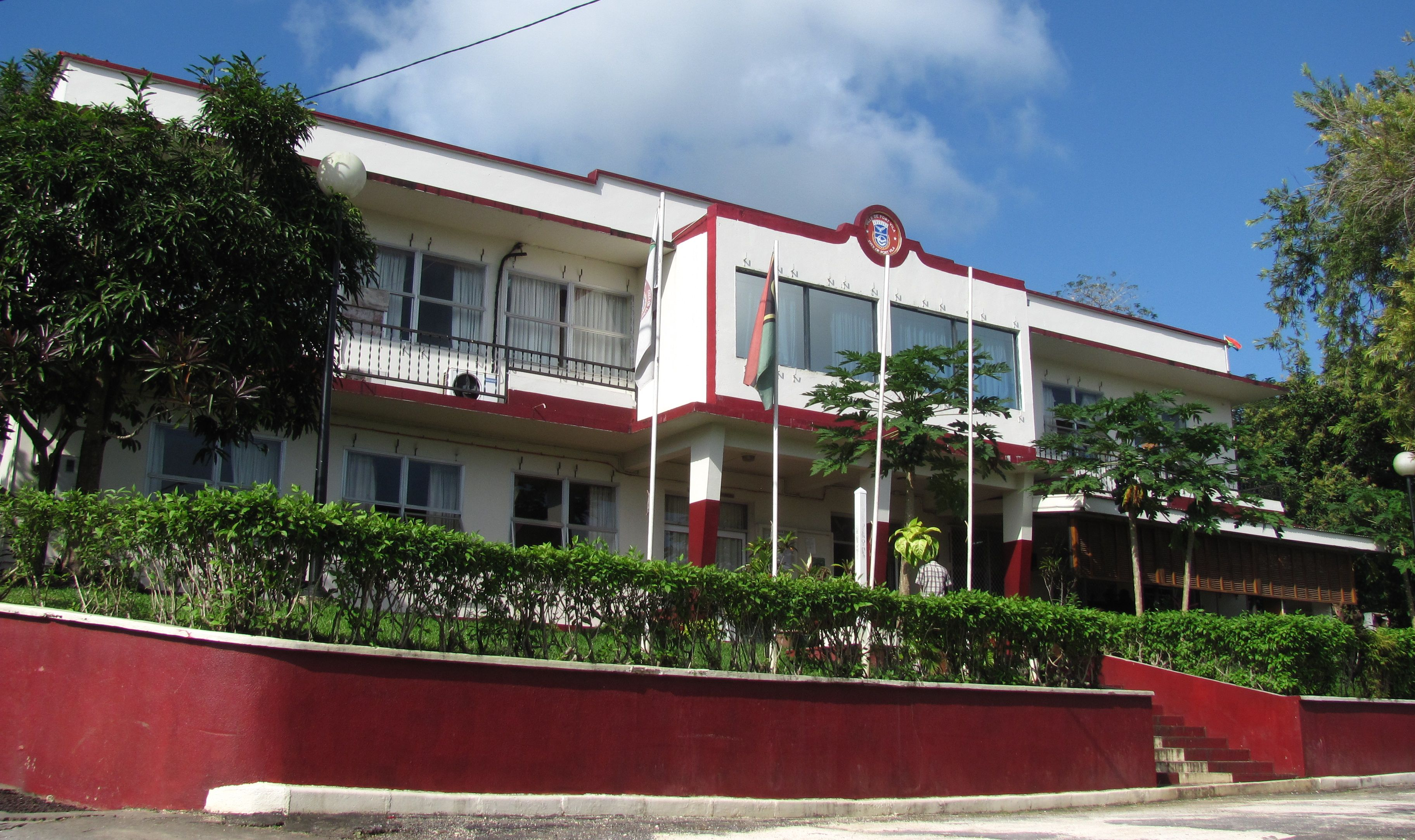
- From top: left to right – aerial view of central Port Vila, Parliament building, Port Vila Harbour and Port Vila City Hall.

- Flag

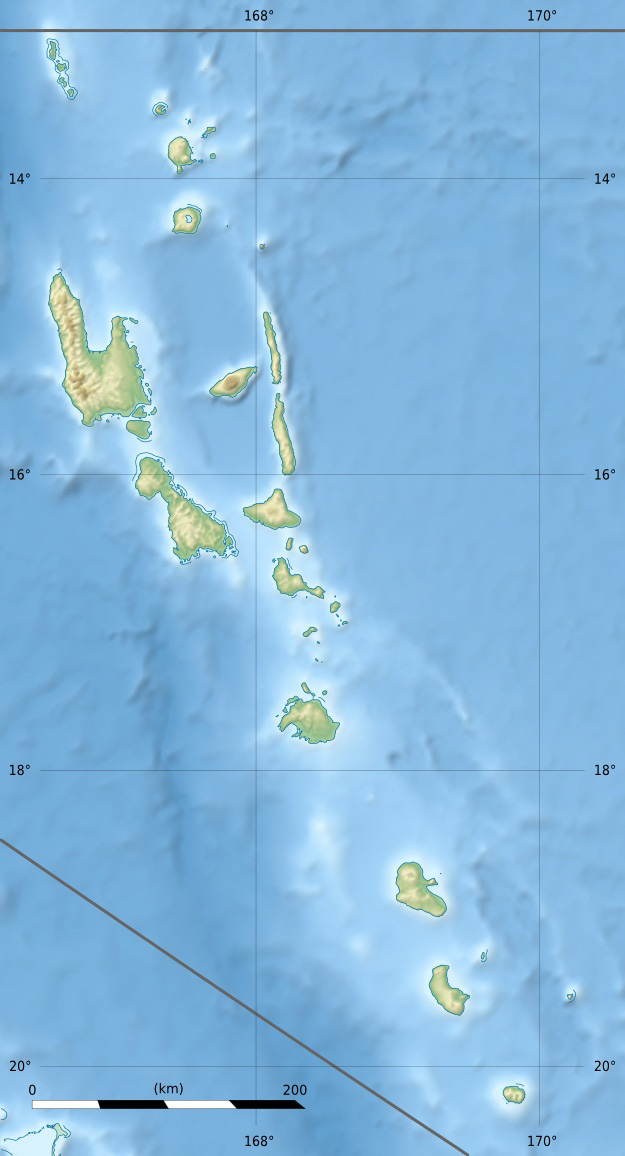
- Location in Vanuatu Location in Oceania
- Coordinates: 17°44′S 168°19′E
- Country: Vanuatu
- Province: Shefa Province
- Island: Efate

Government
  - Mayor: Jenny Regenvanu (GJP)

Area
  - Total: 23.6 km^{2} (9.1 sq mi)
- Elevation: 59 m (194 ft)

Population (2020)
  - Total: 49,034
  - Density: 2,080/km^{2} (5,380/sq mi)
- Time zone: UTC+11:00 (VUT)

Port Vila (/ˈviːlə/ VEE-lə; French: Port-Vila [pɔʁ vila]), or simply Vila (Bislama: [viˈla]), is the capital of Vanuatu and its largest city. It is on the island of Efate, in Shefa Province. The population was 49,034 as of the 2020 Vanuatu census. This represented 16.3% of Vanuatu's total population in 2020.

Located on the west coast of the island of Efate, Port Vila is the economic and commercial centre of Vanuatu. The mayor is Jenny Regenvanu of the Land and Justice Party, the first woman to hold the position, elected in August 2024. Her deputy was Marie Louise Milne, of the Green Confederation, until the seat was vacated in January 2025.

== Name ==
Locally, the town is most commonly referred to simply as "Vila", whether in French or Bislama [viˈla] or in English /ˈviːlə/ VEE-lə (not like English "villa").

The name of the area is Efil in the native South Efate language and Ifira in neighbouring Mele-Fila language. Vila is a variant of these names. Ifira is a small island in Vila Harbour where many traditional landowners reside.

== History ==
Melanesian people have occupied the Port Vila area for thousands of years. In the autumn of 2004, an archaeological expedition known as Teouma discovered a burial site of 25 tombs containing three dozen skeletons of members of the Lapita culture. Pieces of ceramics found at the site were dated to the 13th century BC.

Efate Island was charted in 1774 by James Cook, who named it Sandwich Island. Cook's expedition did not land but noted the presence of good harbours and land suitable for European settlement. In the late 19th century, when the islands were known as the New Hebrides, the British initially had the dominant European presence. However, by the 1890s, the economic balance had begun favouring the French, who established large plantations. French citizen Ferdinand Chevillard began buying and clearing land around Port Vila to be converted into the largest French plantation on the island. Instead, it was converted into the municipality of Franceville, which declared independence on 9 August 1889, though this only lasted until June of the following year.

After 1887, the territory was jointly administered by the French and the British. This was formalized in 1906 as an Anglo-French Condominium. During World War II, Port Vila was an American and Australian airbase.

In 1987, Cyclone Uma severely damaged the city. A powerful earthquake on 3 January 2002 caused minor damage in the capital and surrounding areas.

The city suffered massive damage from a category 5 cyclone named Cyclone Pam on 13 March 2015, whose eye wall passed just to the east of Port Vila. On 17 December 2024, a magnitude 7.3 earthquake reportedly damaged almost every single house in Port Vila, resulting in 16 fatalities. The United Nations Office for the Coordination of Humanitarian Affairs estimated that 116,000 people had been directly affected by the earthquake, equivalent to a third of Vanuatu's population.

== Geography ==
=== Climate ===
Port Vila has a tropical climate, more specifically a tropical rainforest climate, with noticeably wetter and drier months. As the trade winds are almost permanent and cyclones are not rare in Port Vila, the climate is not equatorial but maritime trade-wind tropical climate. Rainfall averages about 2,338.9 millimetres or 92.08 inches per year, and the wettest month is March. The driest month is September. There are 153 wet days in an average year. The area also has south-east trade winds. Temperatures do not vary much throughout the year, and the record high is 35.6 °C or 96.1 °F. The coolest month, July, has an average high of 27 °C or 80.6 °F, and an average low of 18 °C or 64.4 °F. The hottest month, February, has an average high of 31.2 °C or 88.2 °F and an average low of 23 °C or 73.4 °F. The record low for Port Vila is 8.5 °C or 47.3 °F. Humidity is often high.

Climate data for Port Vila, Vanuatu (Bauerfield International Airport)
Month	Jan	Feb	Mar	Apr	May	Jun	Jul	Aug	Sep	Oct	Nov	Dec	Year
Record high °C (°F)	35.0 (95.0)	33.9 (93.0)	33.5 (92.3)	32.5 (90.5)	31.1 (88.0)	32.0 (89.6)	34.3 (93.7)	32.0 (89.6)	31.5 (88.7)	31.2 (88.2)	33.0 (91.4)	35.6 (96.1)	35.6 (96.1)
Mean daily maximum °C (°F)	31.3 (88.3)	31.2 (88.2)	30.8 (87.4)	29.9 (85.8)	28.8 (83.8)	27.4 (81.3)	26.4 (79.5)	27.0 (80.6)	27.7 (81.9)	28.5 (83.3)	29.2 (84.6)	30.7 (87.3)	29.1 (84.4)
Daily mean °C (°F)	26.4 (79.5)	26.5 (79.7)	26.3 (79.3)	25.3 (77.5)	24.1 (75.4)	23.0 (73.4)	22.1 (71.8)	22.0 (71.6)	22.7 (72.9)	23.4 (74.1)	24.6 (76.3)	25.7 (78.3)	24.3 (75.7)
Mean daily minimum °C (°F)	22.5 (72.5)	23.0 (73.4)	22.6 (72.7)	22.0 (71.6)	20.2 (68.4)	19.8 (67.6)	18.2 (64.8)	18.0 (64.4)	18.4 (65.1)	19.6 (67.3)	20.7 (69.3)	21.7 (71.1)	20.5 (68.9)
Record low °C (°F)	15.8 (60.4)	15.0 (59.0)	16.3 (61.3)	14.5 (58.1)	13.4 (56.1)	10.0 (50.0)	8.5 (47.3)	10.0 (50.0)	9.9 (49.8)	11.0 (51.8)	12.6 (54.7)	15.2 (59.4)	8.5 (47.3)
Average rainfall mm (inches)	316.1 (12.44)	273.7 (10.78)	320.9 (12.63)	255.2 (10.05)	210.3 (8.28)	180.0 (7.09)	94.4 (3.72)	87.4 (3.44)	87.3 (3.44)	134.1 (5.28)	192.3 (7.57)	187.2 (7.37)	2,338.9 (92.09)
Average rainy days (≥ 1.0 mm)	15.4	16.6	18.5	17.1	12.9	11.3	10.3	9.8	8.1	8.4	12.1	13.2	153.7
Average relative humidity (%)	84	85	86	87	85	85	83	82	80	81	82	83	84
Average dew point °C (°F)	24 (75)	24 (75)	24 (75)	23 (73)	21 (70)	21 (70)	20 (68)	20 (68)	20 (68)	21 (70)	22 (72)	23 (73)	22 (71)
Mean monthly sunshine hours	220.1	155.4	198.4	165.0	170.5	162.0	148.8	167.4	174.0	198.4	180.0	195.3	2,135.3
Mean daily sunshine hours	7.1	5.5	6.4	5.5	5.5	5.4	4.8	5.4	5.8	6.4	6.0	6.3	5.8
Source 1: Deutscher Wetterdienst
Source 2: Time and Date (dewpoints, between 2005–2015)

=== Economy and transport ===
Port Vila is Vanuatu's most important harbour and the center of the country's trade. The international airport, Bauerfield International (VLI), is also located in the city. Air Vanuatu has its head office in Vanuatu House in Port Vila.

Major industries in the city remain agriculture and fishing. Tourism is also becoming important, especially from Australia and New Zealand. There were over 80,000 visitors in 1997.

Vanuatu is a tax haven, and offshore financing in Port Vila is an important part of the economy.

Vanuatu is still dependent on foreign aid, most of which comes from Australia and New Zealand, although in recent years, assistance has also come from China. One example was New Zealand paying to train doctors selected from the local community, then paying part of their wages during the first year after qualification. Australia has paid consultants to work in Port Vila Central Hospital.

35.7% of exports leave from Port Vila, and 86.9% of imports arrive in Port Vila.

== Population ==
=== Demographics ===
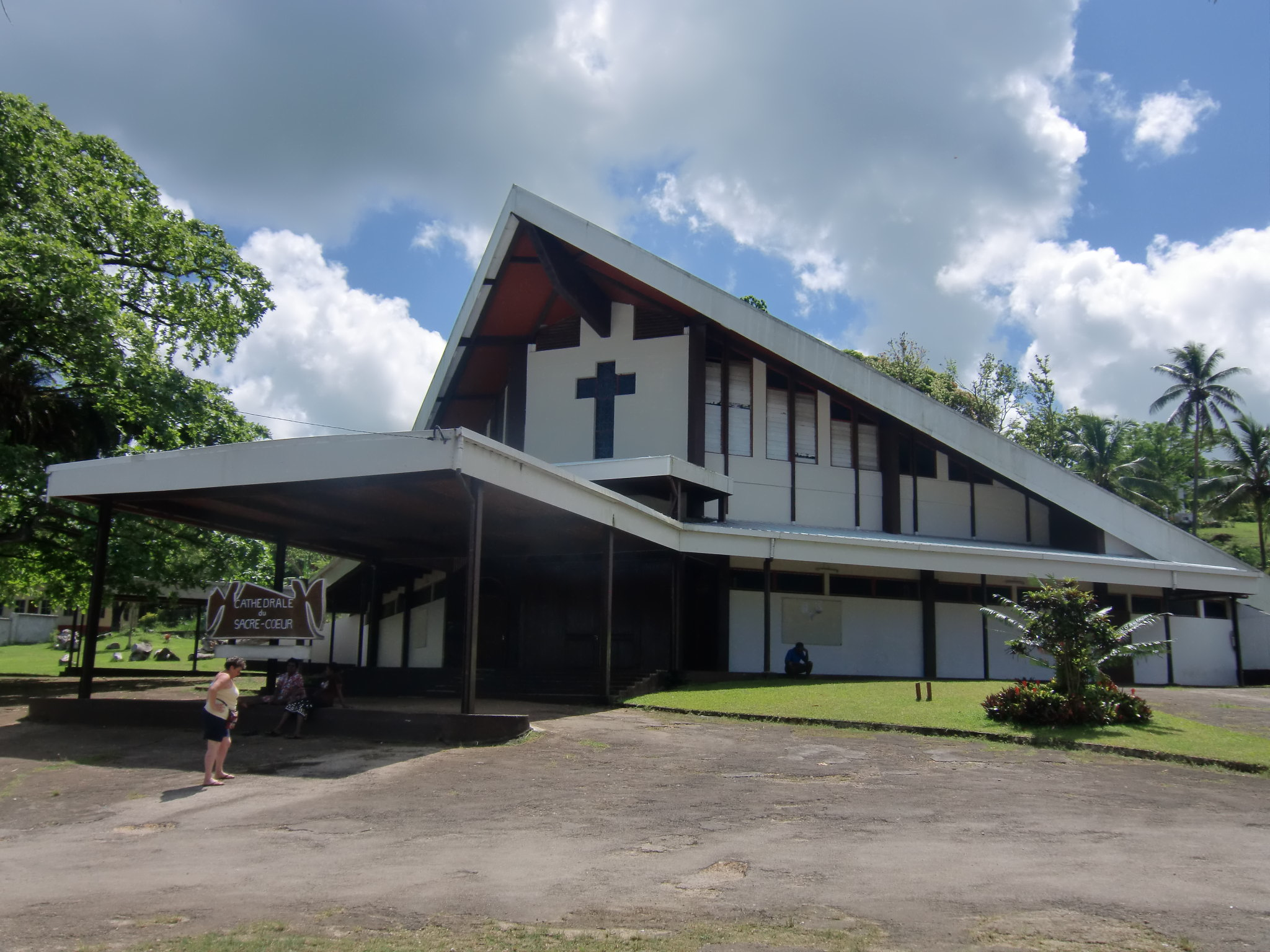
Cathédrale du Sacré-Cœur, Port Vila

The population is around 45,000; predominately Melanesian, with small Polynesian, Asian, Australian and European populations, mainly French and British.

=== Languages ===
Port Vila is home to many languages, reflecting the country's high linguistic diversity.

The capital city's daily lingua franca is Bislama, but English and French are also widely spoken. As of the 2020 census, 90.0% of the population were literate in English, and 47.0% in French.

Among Vanuatu's 138 indigenous languages, many are spoken in the capital, as people from rural areas come to live in the city, either temporarily or permanently. According to the 2020 census, 79.1% of the capital's population could read, and 76.9% could write, in an indigenous language.

=== Religion ===
Christianity is the predominant religion across Vanuatu, followed by more than 90% of the population. The largest denomination is the Presbyterian Church in Vanuatu, followed by one-third of the population. Roman Catholicism and the Church of Melanesia are also common, each about 15%. Cathédrale du Sacré-Cœur is a modern Roman Catholic cathedral in Port Vila. The seat of the Diocese of Port Vila, the church is dedicated to the Sacred Heart of Jesus. On 5 October 2020, The Church of Jesus Christ of Latter-Day Saints announced plans to construct a temple in the city, and the Baháʼí Faith community is also established in Port Vila.

== Culture and education ==
=== Highlights of the city ===
The capital of Vanuatu has various sights to offer. There are several memorials, e.g., opposite the Parliament, where two traditional totem poles and a monument representing a pig's tusk can be seen. The Presbyterian Church of Port Vila is an impressive and sightworthy building opposite the Independence Park. A colourful wall painting can be seen on the administration building opposite the market hall. Another noteworthy wall painting is on the façade of the post office. The City Hall of Port Vila is an oblong and sightworthy building on a hill in the city centre.

Cityscape
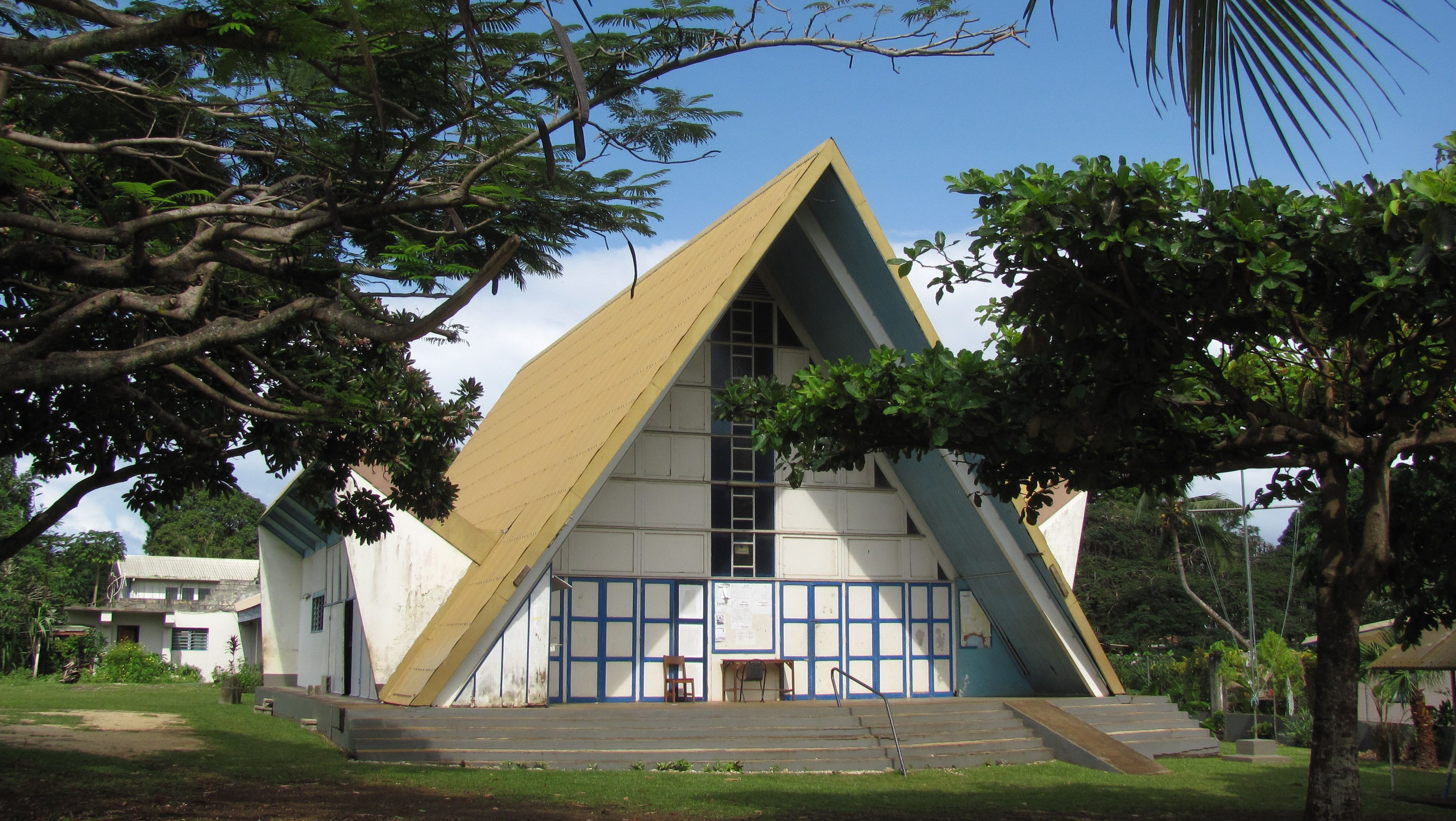
Presbyterian Church

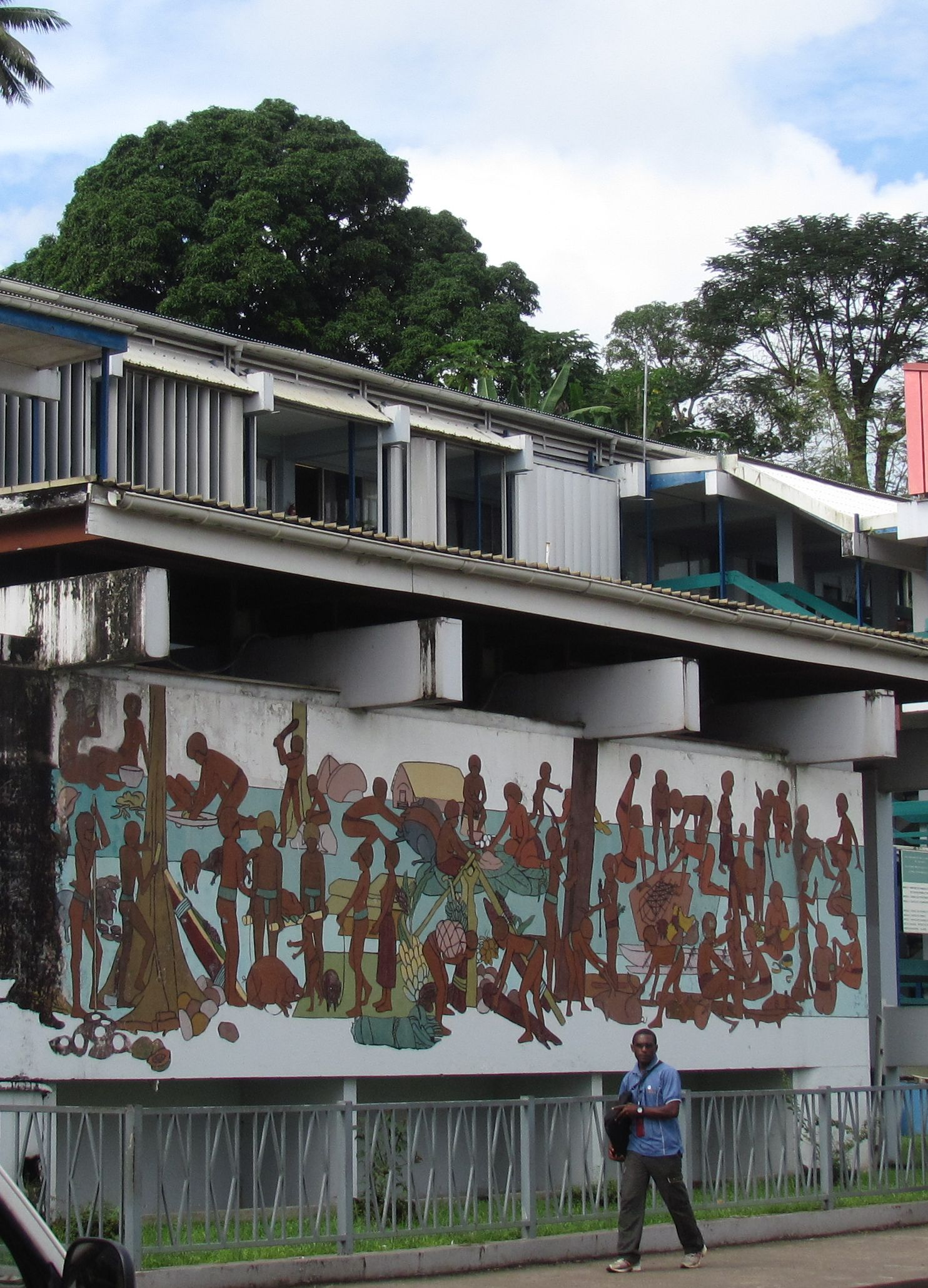
Wall painting opposite the market

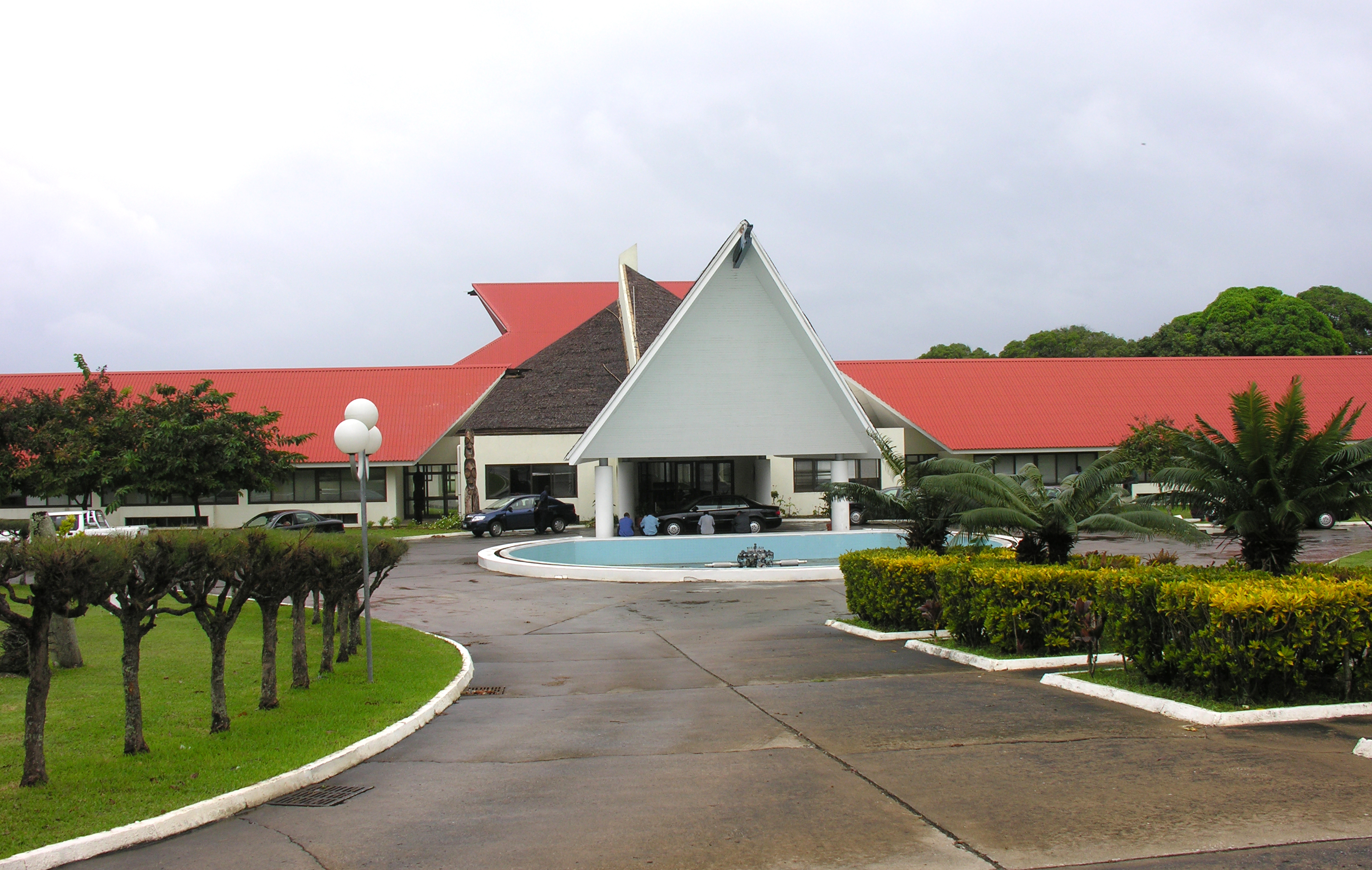
Vanuatu Parliament

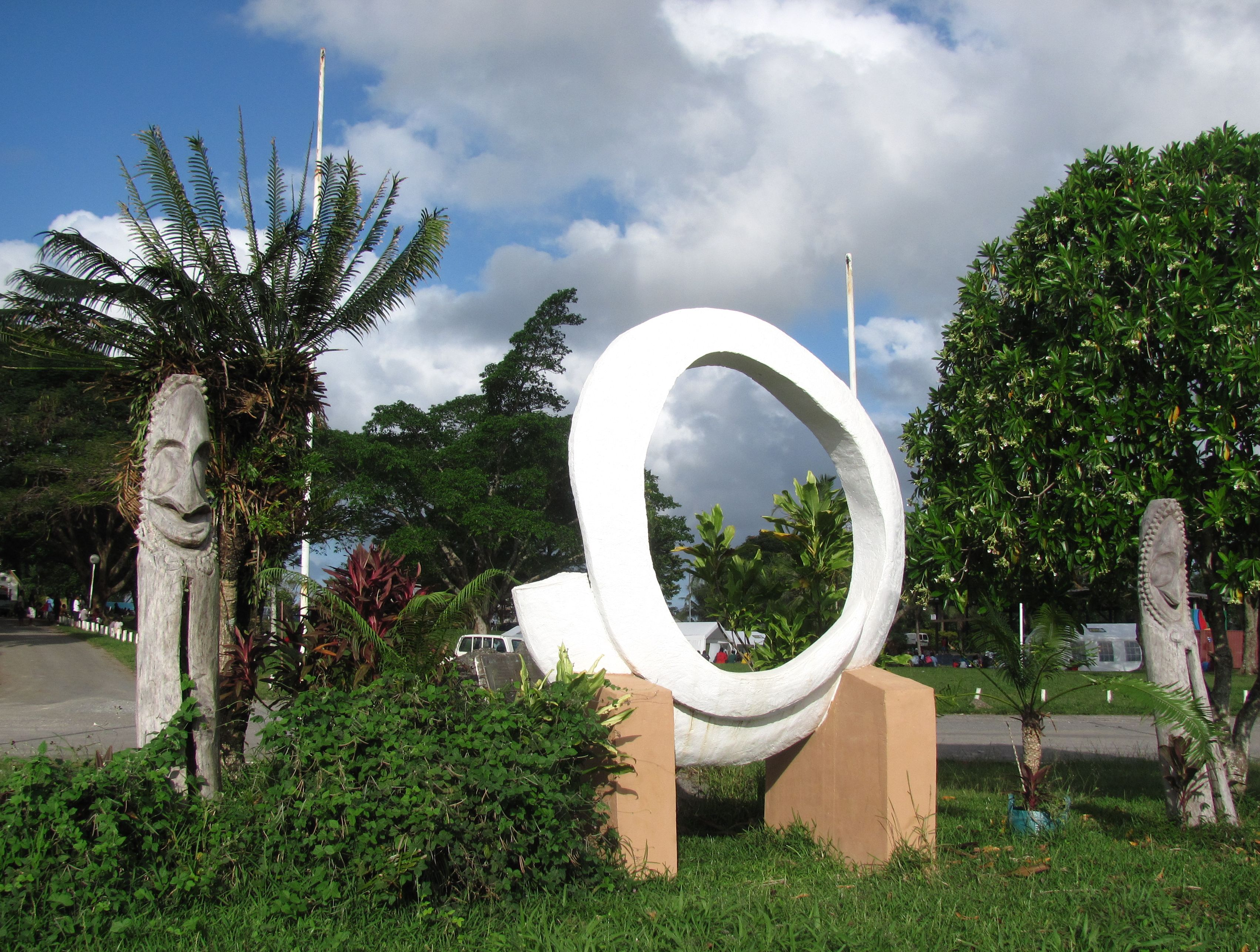
Memorial opposite the Parliament building

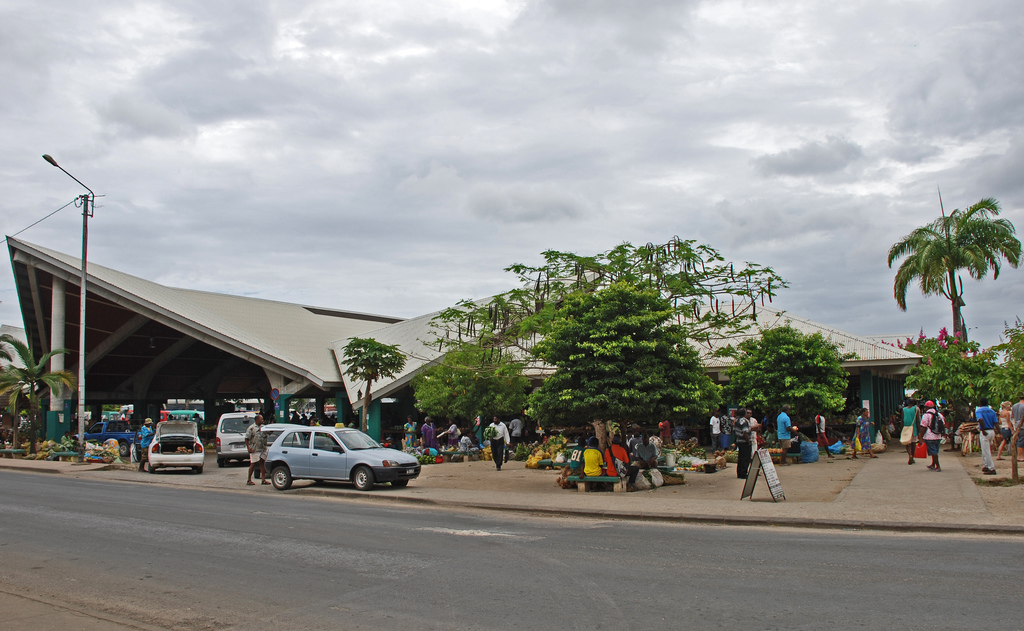
Market hall

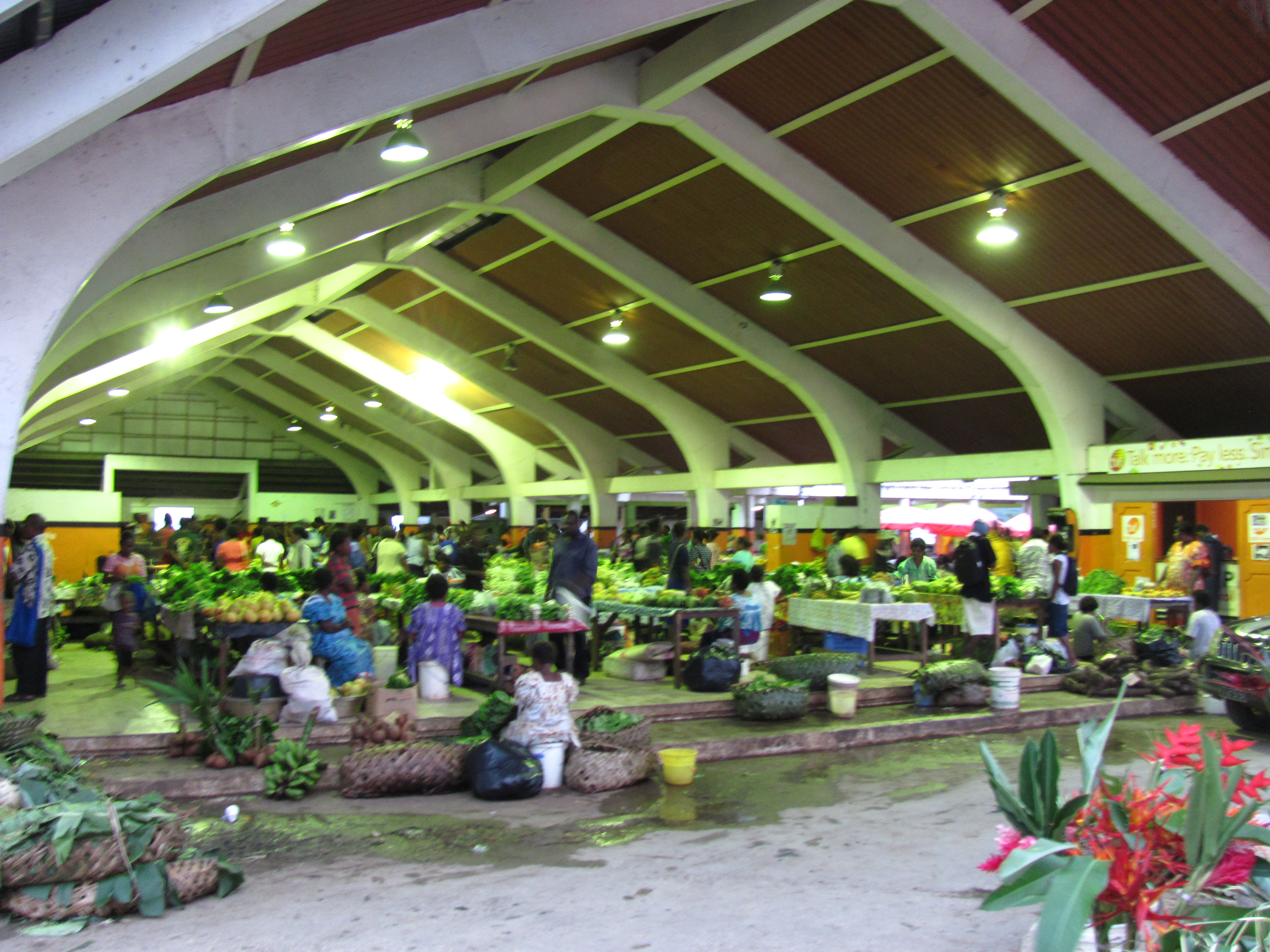
Market

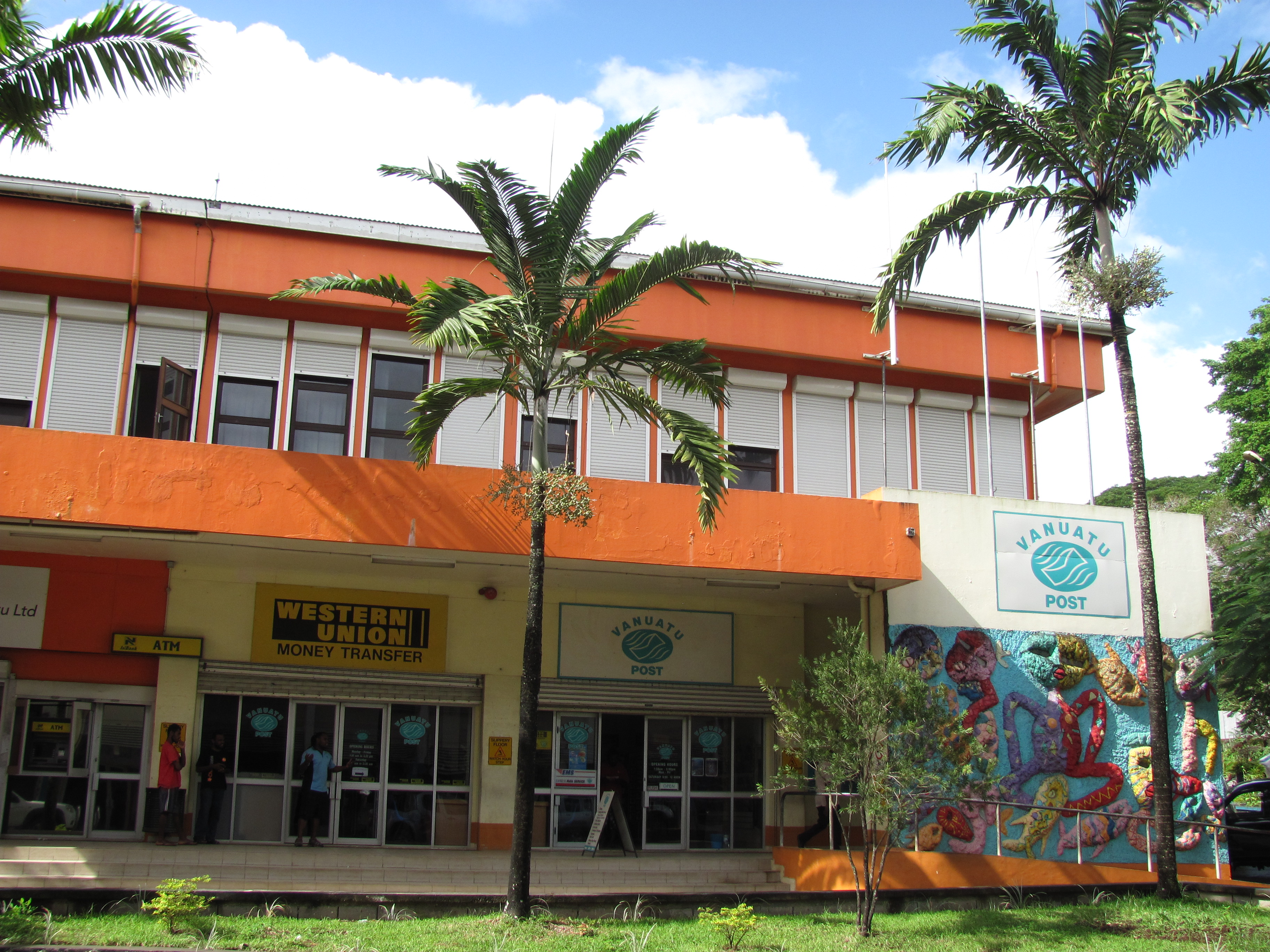
Post office. The building once marked the unofficial demarcation between the two sectors of Port Vila, the British Paddock to the south and the Quartier français to the north

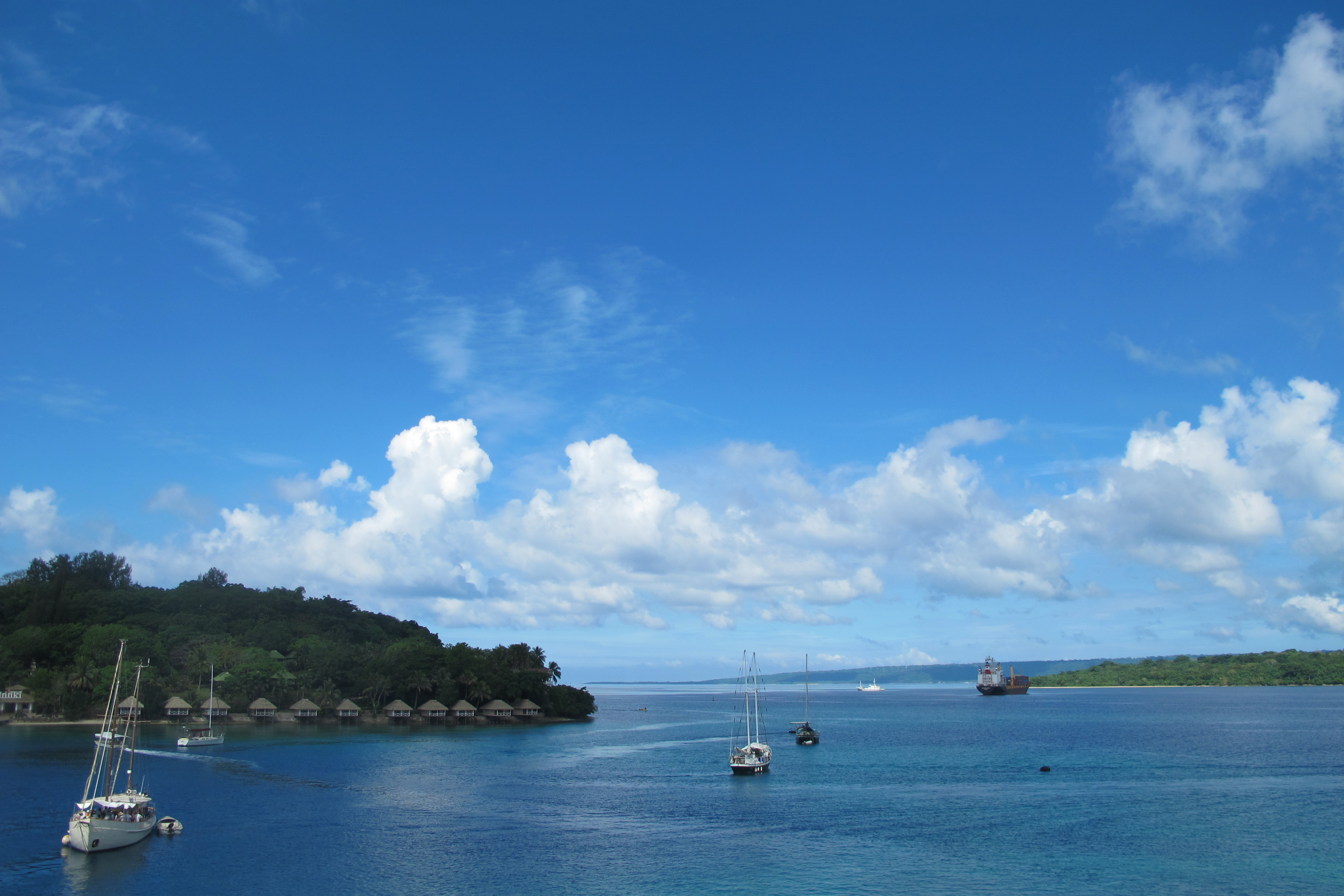
The natural harbour as viewed from town looking out at sea with Iririki Island to the left

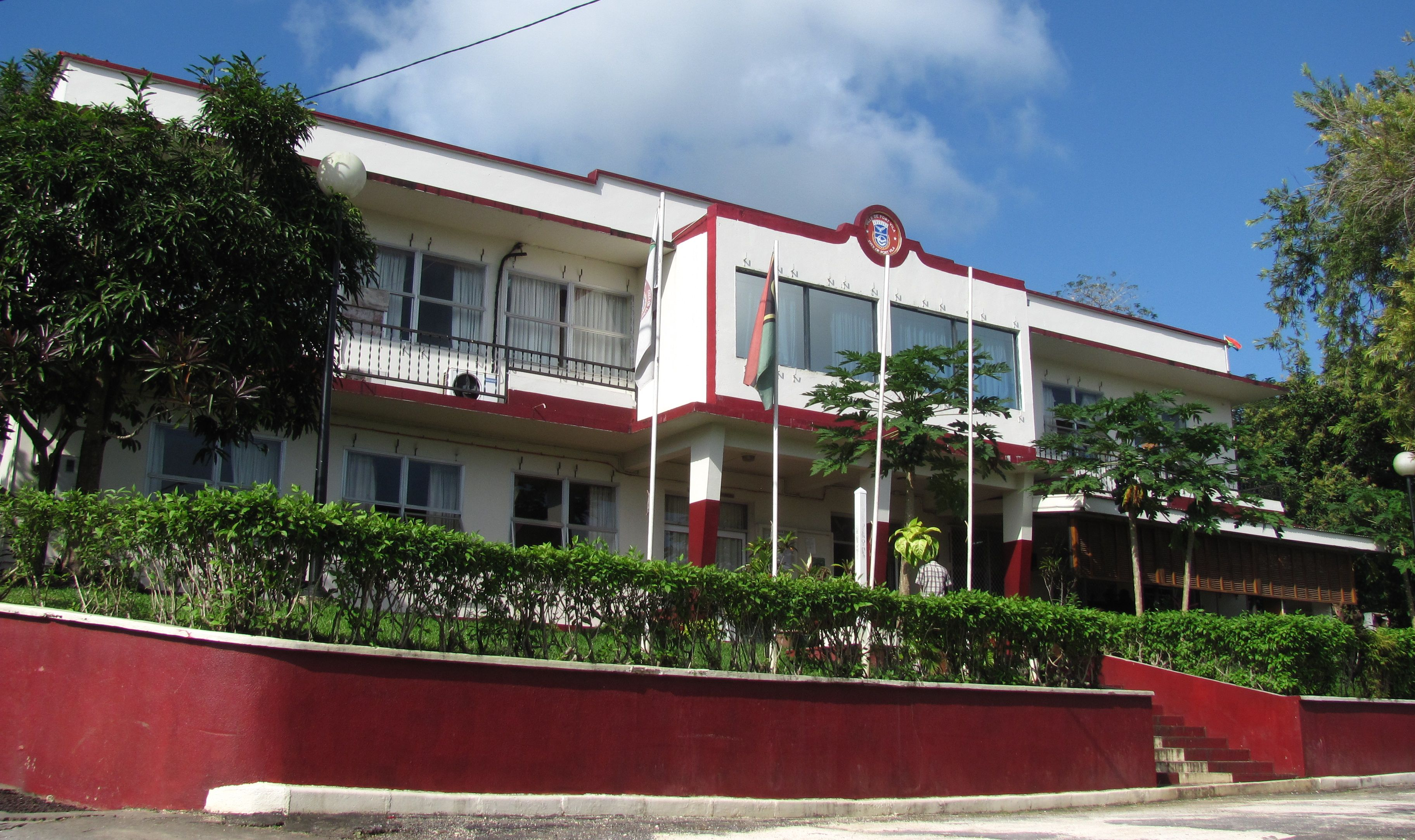
City Hall

Grand Hotel and Casino Vanuatu, the tallest building in the country

=== Vanuatu Cultural Centre ===
The Vanuatu Cultural Centre, hosting the Vanuatu National Museum, is located at the Saralana Park in front of the National Parliament, close to the National Library and the Malvatumauri (Vanuatu National Council of Chiefs). This institution is an important place to preserve and promote the different aspects of the local culture. Traditional artifacts from several islands are on display in the museum. The centre also hosts the National Audiovisual Archives, the most critical fund of documents from the late 19th century until today.

=== World Heritage ===
Port Vila was the location in August 1999 for the "2nd World Heritage Global Strategy Meeting for the Pacific Islands Region" held by UNESCO. One of the major topics related to Vanuatu and the Pacific region was the question of the suitability of underwater heritage for inscription on the World Heritage List.

=== Education ===
Port Vila is one location of the University of the South Pacific, an educational institution co-owned by twelve Pacific countries. The Vanuatu campus is the only law school in the university and teaches languages.

Upper secondary (sixth form/senior high school) institutions include:

- Port Vila International School
- Central Secondary School
- Epauto Adventist Senior Secondary School
- Lycée de Montmartre
- Lycée Français J. M. G. Le Clézio (French international school)
- Malapoa College (Formerly known as British Secondary School)
- Onesua Presbyterian College
- NTCU Port Vila Christian College

Junior secondary (seventh form to tenth form) institutions include:

- Port Vila International School
- Central Secondary School
- Malapoa College (Formerly known as British Secondary School)
- NTCU Port Vila Christian College
- Seaside Community Secondary School
- Sorovanga Self-Support Community School
- Suango Mele Junior Secondary School
- Ulei Junior Secondary School
- Vila North Secondary School

=== Sport ===
==== Football ====
Like in the rest of Vanuatu, association football (also known as "soccer") is the most popular sport in Port Vila, though like in the rest of the Oceania Football Confederation (OFC) the sport is not professional in Vanuatu.

The Port Vila Football League (PVFL) is the local men's football league in Port Vila. The league has three divisions: the Premier League (PVPL), the First Division (PVFD) and the Second Division (PVSD). Teams from the city have also competed in the VFF Champions League (VFFCL), the national men's football league of Vanuatu, though teams from the Port Vila Football Federation (PVFF, the city's football federation) no longer compete and thus nowadays the only team from Greater Vanuatu in the league is Ifira Black Bird. However, women's teams from Port Vila do compete in the VFF Women's Champions League (VFFWCL), the women's equivalent of the VFFCL that began in 2023.

The bulk of Vanuatu's footballing success has always been in Port Vila. Only two Vanuatuan teams, both from Port Vila, have reached the final of the OFC Men's Champions League (OFCMCL), with Tafea FC having done so in 2001 and Amicale FC having done so in 2011 and 2014, though neither club was successful. Indeed, Tafea FC is Vanuatu's most successful football club, with the club having won the PVPL 16 times including all of the first 15 seasons from 1994 to 2008–09, which to this day is the world record for the most domestic league titles in a row. The club would then go without a league title until 2018–19, when the club won its first league title in 10 years. The club has also won the VFFCL (then the Vanuatu National Soccer League (VNSL)) four times.

== Institutions ==
=== Municipality ===
The municipality of Port Vila is divided into four wards and administered by a council of 14 members. The four wards are:

1. Malapoa-Tagabe: Western and far northern neighborhoods
2. Anabrou-Melcofe-Tassiriki: Northern and Eastern neighborhoods
3. Centre: Nambawan and Seaside neighborhoods
4. South: Nambatu, Nambatri, and Elluk neighborhoods

Malapoa-Tagabe and South are allotted three representatives each to the council, while Anabrou-Melcofe-Tassiriki and Centre have four.

The municipality handles primary education, primary health care, regional planning, road maintenance and construction, trash collection, cemeteries, parks and open spaces, and tourism promotion.

There are also informal settlements such as Blacksands, which are effectively Vila suburbs but outside the municipality. Living conditions in some of these neighbourhoods are deplorable. Lack of service provision and insecure land tenure are major problems. Blacksands was squatted in the 1960s.

The most recent municipal council election was held in 2022.

== Politics ==
=== Mayoralty and council ===
The local council is the Port Vila City Council (PVCC). Port Vila is the only city in Vanuatu with a lord mayor (or lady mayor). The current Lady Mayor is Jenny Regenvanu of the Land and Justice Party (GJP), the first woman to hold the position after she was elected in 2024.

=== Constituency ===
Port Vila is one of the eighteen constituencies in Vanuatu and elects five Members of Parliament. Following the 2025 general election, its representatives are:

Member	Party
Harry Anthony Iarrish	Union of Moderate Parties
Alatoi Ishmael Kalsakau	Union of Moderate Parties
Jackson Lessa	Leaders Party of Vanuatu
Marie Louise Paulette Milne	Green Confederation
Ralph Regenvanu	Land and Justice Party

==== Election results ====
Traditionally, the centre-right Union of Moderate Parties (UMP) and the centre-left Vanua'aku Pati are the two major political parties in Port Vila.

Initially a competitive city, Port Vila began to lean heavily to the UMP in the late 1980s, with the UMP having won the majority of votes in the city in 1987 and a plurality in 1991. In 1991, the centre-left National United Party (NUP) emerged as a third party, but were unsuccessful in overtaking the UMP and Vanua'aku. In 1995, Vanua'aku regained the plurality of votes in Port Vila and won a majority of seats in the city.

After the late 1990s, MMP and Vanua'aku's vote shares began dropping and the vote for minor parties and independents surged, a trend that only continued further into the 2000s. However, due to Vanuatu's electoral system, Vanua'aku and the UMP continued to sometimes receive a plurality of seats in Port Vila. In 2008, for the first time since the party was founded, the UMP won no seats in Port Vila after a record low vote share of just 7.90%.

By the 2010s and 2020s, the UMP vote had begun recovering despite Vanua'aku's vote continuing to drop (reaching a record low of 6.15% in 2020), with the UMP regularly emerging as the party with the most seats in the city. In 2025, UMP candidates won a combined total of 26.24% of the vote, the party's highest vote share in Port Vila since 1995.

General election results in Port Vila
Year	GC		GJP		NUP		UMP		VP		O		Ref.
Year	%	S	%	S	%	S	%	S	%	S	%	S	Ref.
2025	6.55%	1	10.12%	1	5.15%	0	26.24%	2	11.48%	0	40.46%	1	
2022	5.72%	0	12.57%	1	2.40%	0	12.91%	2	6.98%	0	53.94%	2	
2020	5.34%	0	9.74%	1	3.10%	0	19.42%	2	6.15%	1	56.25%	1	
2016	6.77%	1	7.52%	1	1.99%	0	13.61%	1	8.33%	1	61.78%	2	
2012	5.75%	1	17.15%	1	2.57%	0	11.01%	2	13.33%	1	50.19%	1	
2008	6.88%	1	—N/a	—N/a	8.89%	1	7.90%	0	10.07%	1	66.26%	2	
2004	6.54%	1	—N/a	—N/a	6.17%	1	14.44%	1	10.89%	1	61.96%	1	
2002	8.11%	1	—N/a	—N/a	9.37%	1	12.82%	1	22.22%	2	47.48%	1	
1998	—N/a	—N/a	—N/a	—N/a	6.21%	0	18.22%	2	25.60%	3	49.97%	1	
1995	—N/a	—N/a	—N/a	—N/a	19.35%	1	27.04%	2	37.67%	3	15.94%	0	
1991	—N/a	—N/a	—N/a	—N/a	18.12%	1	33.38%	2	23.83%	2	24.67%	0	
1987	—N/a	—N/a	—N/a	—N/a	—N/a	—N/a	52.77%	3	40.13%	2	7.10%	0	

== Transportation ==
Port Vila is served by Bauerfield International Airport, with service on many passenger and cargo airlines, including several foreign ones.

In May 2024, state-owned Air Vanuatu entered liquidation, resulting in short-term cancellations and schedule disruptions. Capacity on routes to Australia was subsequently restored and expanded by other carriers, including Qantas (Brisbane–Port Vila from 1

== Twin towns – sister cities ==
Port Vila is twinned with:

- Bora-Bora, French Polynesia
- Dumbéa, New Caledonia
- Foshan, China
- Lifou, New Caledonia
- Shanghai, China
- Yinchuan, China
