= People's Unity Development Party =

Political party in Vanuatu

- Abbreviation: PUDP
- Parliament: 0 / 52

The People's Unity Development Party (PUDP) is a political party in Vanuatu.

== History ==
In 2022, the party signed an opposition plegde with Vanua’aku Pati (VP), Rural Development Party (RDP), Iauko Group (IG), National United Party (NUP) and the Reunification Movement for Change (RMC).

== Politicians ==
- James Bule

== Election results ==
Election	Votes	%	Seats	+/–
2020	1,870	1.30	1	+1
2022	1,864	1.41	1	-
2025	1,020	0.70	0	–1

== See also ==
- List of political parties in Vanuatu
