= Marie Louise Milne =

Politician in Vanuatu

Marie Louise Paulette Milne (born c. 1990) is a politician in Vanuatu. In 2025, she was elected to the Parliament of Vanuatu, becoming the only woman currently serving in the country's 52-member legislature.

== Biography ==
Marie Louise Milne was born around 1990. Her family is from Shefa Province's Eton village and descended from the Chief Roi Mata, and she also has Scottish French ancestry on her father's side. She is known by the nickname Malou.

Milne studied at the Ecole Colardeau, graduating in 2007 with a baccalauréat in accounting and enterprise management.

She is married to former Vanuatu Prime Minister Moana Carcasses Kalosil. While deputy prime minister, her husband and several other members of parliament were convicted of bribery and corruption, and he spent two years in prison.

== Career ==
In 2018, Milne became chairwoman of town planning in Port Vila, Vanuatu's capital. She was elected twice to the Port Vila City Council, eventually becoming the city's deputy mayor. She stepped down from this role in January 2025 to run for higher office.

In the 2025 Vanuatuan general election, Milne was elected to the Parliament of Vanuatu, winning a seat in the Port Vila Constituency with 1,227 votes. She ran as a member of the Green Confederation party, becoming the party's only member in the new Parliament. Her husband, the party's leader, failed to win election to represent the Efate Rural Constituency.

She was one of only seven women running in that year's election, and she became the only woman currently serving in Vanuatu's 52-member Parliament. The previous Parliament also only had one female member, Gloria Julia King, who failed to win reelection in 2025. Additionally, no woman had been elected to represent Port Vila since Motarilavoa Hilda Lin̄i, who served from the late 1980s to early '90s.

Under new rules established by the 2024 Vanuatuan constitutional referendum, as the only Green Confederation parliamentarian elected, Milne was forced to either join a larger party within the Parliament or vacate her seat. She chose to join the Iauko Group.
