= 2025 Vanuatuan general election =

- 16 January 2025
- All 52 seats in Parliament; 27 seats needed for a majority
| Party | Leader | Vote % | Seats | +/– |
|---|---|---|---|---|
| UMP | Ishmael Kalsakau | 15.51 | 6 | −1 |
| Vanua'aku Pati | Johnny Koanapo | 14.70 | 7 | 0 |
| RMC | Charlot Salwai | 11.72 | 5 | 0 |
| Leaders Party | Jotham Napat | 11.07 | 9 | +4 |
| Land & Justice | Ralph Regenvanu | 6.61 | 5 | +1 |
| Iauko | Marc Ati | 6.42 | 6 | +3 |
| Rural Development | Jay Ngwele | 5.52 | 6 | +2 |
| National United | Ham Lini | 2.45 | 1 | −3 |
| Laverwo Party | | 2.39 | 1 | 0 |
| Nagriamel | John Lum | 2.12 | 1 | 0 |
| Green Confederation | | 1.78 | 1 | +1 |
| Progressive Development | | 1.56 | 1 | 0 |
| Ngwasoanda | | 0.69 | 1 | 0 |
| Namarakieana | | 0.32 | 1 | 0 |
| Independents | | 9.20 | 1 | 0 |
This lists parties that won seats. See the complete results below.
| Prime Minister before | Prime Minister after |
|---|---|
| Charlot Salwai; Reunification Movement for Change | Jotham Napat; Leaders Party of Vanuatu |

Snap general elections were held in Vanuatu on 16 January 2025, having been moved from 14 January 2025 due to the 2024 Port Vila earthquake on 17 December. The election results showed no political party winning a majority in Parliament, prompting the creation of a coalition government on 27 January.

== Background ==
The election was called after President Nikenike Vurobaravu dissolved Parliament on the eve of a no-confidence motion against Prime Minister Charlot Salwai in November 2024. Originally scheduled on 14 January 2025, the election was moved to 16 January 2025 due to the 2024 Port Vila earthquake on 17 December. There are over 300,000 registered voters.

== Issues ==
The most pivotal issue for many Ni-Vanuatu is how to rebuild following the December 2024 earthquake. The estimated cost to rebuild Port Vila, the nation's capital, and other areas affected by the earthquake is 29 billion vatu ($374 million). Additionally, efforts to rebuild following the earthquake only adds to the list of other disasters for which the country needs to rebuild, namely three tropical cyclones in 2023, an airline collapse, and the economic impact of COVID. Fears regarding the safety of an ability to travel may also have effects on the results. In addition to the injuries caused by the earthquake and the loss of personal property, more than 110 classrooms across 45 schools have also been damaged. Moreover the Port Vila Central Business District remains closed. This could impact whether people feel safe to travel on damaged roads to new polling locations and whether they have the fares required to travel by bus.

Additionally, political stability could be a motivating issue for some. Within the 18 months prior to the snap election, Vanuatu has experienced three Prime Ministers. The Vanuatu Parliament experienced a series of "floor crossings" by members of parliament which led to levels of uncertainty. In an effort to prevent this from occurring, and thereby preserve political stability, Vanuatu held a referendum in May 2024 adopting two new constitutional provisions. The first would force a member of parliament who leaves or is expelled from the party under which they were elected to resign their seat which would then be filled by a by-election. The second would require elected independents and individuals elected as the only member of their party to join a larger party represented in parliament within three months of the first session. Both measures passed by large margins. Understanding the frustration regarding political instability, some candidates have run on a platform to end political instability with independent candidate Mike Esrom Kaun stating "[p]eople are frustrated, are tired and realize that something has to happen and this has been amplified by the disaster that recently happened."

Economic development may also be a factor for some voters. In 2024, the European Union ended Vanuatu's visa-free access, after previously suspending it in 2022, citing security concerns. Specifically, the EU alleged that Vanuatu has been operating investor citizenship schemes. These schemes enabled third-country nationals who would otherwise be required to have a visa when travelling to the EU to receive Vanuatu citizenship in exchange for an investment, thereby obtaining visa-free access to the EU. This created security concerns for the EU. Since the suspension revenue related to the Vanuatu's citizenship scheme has dropped.

== Electoral system ==
The 52 members of Parliament are elected for four years terms by single non-transferable vote in eighteen constituencies, ten of which are multi-member constituencies of between two and seven seats, while the remaining eight are single-member constituencies in which the member is elected through the first-past-the-post system.

== Candidates ==
Altogether 217 candidates ran in the election, including seven women.

== Conduct ==
Voting was held in 352 polling stations nationwide, along with one station in Nouméa to serve voters residing in New Caledonia, with bus shuttles organised to transport voters there. More than 1,700 officials were deployed to oversee the election, while 350 police officers were also deployed to ensure security during the election. The Vanuatu Election Office acknowledged that it had been hampered in its preparations by the surprise decision to hold the election as well as the 2024 Port Vila earthquake.

== Results ==
Initial results released on 18 January showed the Leaders Party of Vanuatu with a plurality of 11 seats in parliament, followed by the Vanua'aku Party with seven seats, and Union of Moderate Parties and the Reunification Movement for Change with six seats each, the Iauko Group with five seats and the Land and Justice Party winning four seats. Official results were released on 29 January.

Most incumbents were reelected, while at least two neophytes were elected in Port-Vila. The only woman MP in the outgoing parliament, Julia King, lost her seat in Efate. Only one woman was elected to the new parliament, former Port Vila deputy mayor Marie Louise Paulette Milne, who ran in Port Vila Constituency for the Green Confederation. Her husband, former prime minister Moana Carcasses Kalosil, failed to be elected in Efate Rural Constituency. Of 31 independent candidates, only Gaetan Pikioune, who ran in Santo Constituency, was elected.

On 27 January the Leaders Party of Vanuatu, the Vanua'aku Party, the Reunification Movement for Change, the Iauko Group and the Land and Justice Party agreed to form a coalition government. On 11 February, Jotham Napat of the Leaders Party was elected prime minister by parliament, receiving 50 votes and two void ones.

| Party | Votes | % | Seats | +/– |
|---|---|---|---|---|
| Union of Moderate Parties | 22,663 | 15.51 | 6 | –1 |
| Vanua'aku Pati | 21,473 | 14.70 | 7 | 0 |
| Reunification Movement for Change | 17,119 | 11.72 | 5 | 0 |
| Leaders Party of Vanuatu | 16,183 | 11.07 | 9 | +4 |
| Land and Justice Party | 9,666 | 6.61 | 5 | +1 |
| Iauko Group | 9,383 | 6.42 | 6 | +3 |
| Rural Development Party | 8,069 | 5.52 | 6 | +2 |
| National United Party | 3,578 | 2.45 | 1 | –3 |
| Laverwo Party | 3,499 | 2.39 | 1 | 0 |
| Nagriamel | 3,102 | 2.12 | 1 | 0 |
| Green Confederation | 2,606 | 1.78 | 1 | +1 |
| Traditional Governance Party | 2,373 | 1.62 | 0 | New |
| Vanuatu Progressive Development Party | 2,281 | 1.56 | 1 | 0 |
| Vanuatu National Development Party | 1,849 | 1.27 | 0 | –2 |
| People's Progressive Party | 1,310 | 0.90 | 0 | –2 |
| Vanuatu Economic and Industrial Party | 1,082 | 0.74 | 0 | New |
| People's Unity Development Party | 1,020 | 0.70 | 0 | –1 |
| Ngwasoanda Custom Movement | 1,012 | 0.69 | 1 | 0 |
| Wan Nakamal | 853 | 0.58 | 0 | 0 |
| Democratic Aliance for Change | 735 | 0.50 | 0 | New |
| Oceania Transformation Movement | 710 | 0.49 | 0 | 0 |
| Movement for Righteousness, Peace and Justice | 689 | 0.47 | 0 | 0 |
| Namarakieana Movement | 462 | 0.32 | 1 | 0 |
| Vanuatu Self Reliance Party | 344 | 0.24 | 0 | 0 |
| Oyoramada Muvmen | 238 | 0.16 | 0 | New |
| Tohurihuri Movement | 160 | 0.11 | 0 | New |
| Vanuatu National Custom Governance Party | 152 | 0.10 | 0 | New |
| Chief Indigenous People's Party | 67 | 0.05 | 0 | New |
| Independents | 13,445 | 9.20 | 1 | 0 |
| Total | 146,123 | 100.00 | 52 | 0 |
| Valid votes | 146,123 | 99.65 | | |
| Invalid/blank votes | 508 | 0.35 | | |
| Total votes | 146,631 | 100.00 | | |
| Registered voters/turnout | 212,245 | 69.09 | | |
Source: Official Gazette

=== By constituency ===
Ambae
| Candidate | Party | Votes | % |
|---|---|---|---|
| Jay Ngwelelivulivu Ngwele | Rural Development Party | 808 | 18.17 |
| Still John Tari Qetu | Iauko Group | 719 | 16.17 |
| Jean Jacques Ngwele | Iauko Group | 607 | 13.65 |
| Howard Aru | Vanua'aku Pati | 527 | 11.85 |
| Manson Vina | Leaders Party of Vanuatu | 448 | 10.08 |
| James Bule | People's Unity Development Party | 362 | 8.14 |
| Dickson Kui Mala | Rural Development Party | 279 | 6.28 |
| Steven Aru | Independent | 248 | 5.58 |
| Nadia Kwevirakesa Kanegai | Independent | 239 | 5.38 |
| Still Joe Tari | National United Party | 209 | 4.70 |
| Total | | 4,446 | 100.00 |
| Valid votes | | 4,446 | 99.62 |
| Invalid/blank votes | | 17 | 0.38 |
| Total votes | | 4,463 | 100.00 |
| Registered voters/turnout | | 6,707 | 66.54 |

Ambrym
| Candidate | Party | Votes | % |
|---|---|---|---|
| Basil Buleban | Rural Development Party | 919 | 23.92 |
| John Dahmasing Salong | Land and Justice Party | 875 | 22.77 |
| Bong Jean-Alain | Reunification Movement for Change | 673 | 17.52 |
| Hota Michel | Independent | 435 | 11.32 |
| Olsen Tama | Vanua'aku Pati | 390 | 10.15 |
| Norbert Masseing Napong | Traditional Governance Party | 374 | 9.73 |
| Yeoye Elie Sagan | People's Unity Development Party | 105 | 2.73 |
| Thompson Damassing | National United Party | 71 | 1.85 |
| Total | | 3,842 | 100.00 |
| Valid votes | | 3,842 | 99.33 |
| Invalid/blank votes | | 26 | 0.67 |
| Total votes | | 3,868 | 100.00 |
| Registered voters/turnout | | 6,058 | 63.85 |

Banks
| Candidate | Party | Votes | % |
|---|---|---|---|
| Silas Danny Moffet | Leaders Party of Vanuatu | 827 | 25.49 |
| Shadrack Welegtabit | Land and Justice Party | 697 | 21.48 |
| Jack Wona | Rural Development Party | 647 | 19.94 |
| Edmon Sovan | Reunification Movement for Change | 620 | 19.11 |
| Dunstan Hilton | People's Progressive Party | 280 | 8.63 |
| Danstan Tula | Vanua'aku Pati | 174 | 5.36 |
| Total | | 3,245 | 100.00 |
| Valid votes | | 3,245 | 99.39 |
| Invalid/blank votes | | 20 | 0.61 |
| Total votes | | 3,265 | 100.00 |
| Registered voters/turnout | | 5,083 | 64.23 |

Efate
| Candidate | Party | Votes | % |
|---|---|---|---|
| Norris Jack Kalmet | Reunification Movement for Change | 2,701 | 12.16 |
| Luo Jesse | Union of Moderate Parties | 2,642 | 11.90 |
| Felix Stephen Dorrick | Leaders Party of Vanuatu | 2,642 | 11.90 |
| Fred Lui Samuel | Vanua'aku Pati | 2,224 | 10.02 |
| Matai Manaika Kaltabang | Iauko Group | 1,689 | 7.61 |
| Samuel Kalpoilep Andrew | Traditional Governance Party | 1,617 | 7.28 |
| Jean Baptist Tama | Union of Moderate Parties | 1,485 | 6.69 |
| Athy Malachi Simeon | Land and Justice Party | 1,331 | 5.99 |
| Gloria Julia King | Union of Moderate Parties | 1,059 | 4.77 |
| Moana Jacques Raymond Kalosil | Green Confederation | 950 | 4.28 |
| Roro Sambo | Independent | 583 | 2.63 |
| Johnston Kalman Tau | Wan Nakamal | 531 | 2.39 |
| Nalwang John | Independent | 516 | 2.32 |
| Saksak Edmond Saksak | Independent | 475 | 2.14 |
| Stevens Periaso Kalsakau | Vanuatu National Development Party | 414 | 1.86 |
| Charles Carlot | Traditional Governance Party | 382 | 1.72 |
| Katawa Vatoko | Laverwo Party | 312 | 1.41 |
| Morris Tom Kaloran | Vanuatu Self Reliance Party | 200 | 0.90 |
| Bernard Anuel Laouto | Independent | 142 | 0.64 |
| Cliffson Delwin Kalorus Kalkau | Oceania Transformation Movement | 130 | 0.59 |
| Pita Arthur Bae | Wan Nakamal | 106 | 0.48 |
| Emmanuel Manwi Kalomet | Vanuatu National Custom Governance Party | 73 | 0.33 |
| Total | | 22,204 | 100.00 |
| Valid votes | | 22,204 | 99.63 |
| Invalid/blank votes | | 82 | 0.37 |
| Total votes | | 22,286 | 100.00 |
| Registered voters/turnout | | 35,167 | 63.37 |

Epi
| Candidate | Party | Votes | % |
|---|---|---|---|
| Seule Simeon | Laverwo Party | 1,085 | 27.98 |
| Robert Murray Bohn | Vanuatu Progressive Development Party | 1,067 | 27.51 |
| John Nil | Vanuatu Progressive Development Party | 919 | 23.70 |
| Omawa Mael | Union of Moderate Parties | 569 | 14.67 |
| Rose Amambath | Oyoramada Muvmen | 238 | 6.14 |
| Total | | 3,878 | 100.00 |
| Valid votes | | 3,878 | 99.56 |
| Invalid/blank votes | | 17 | 0.44 |
| Total votes | | 3,895 | 100.00 |
| Registered voters/turnout | | 5,585 | 69.74 |

Luganville
| Candidate | Party | Votes | % |
|---|---|---|---|
| Marc Ati | Iauko Group | 2,164 | 31.79 |
| Matai Seremaiah Nawalu | Leaders Party of Vanuatu | 1,962 | 28.82 |
| Eric John Tahun | Vanua'aku Pati | 1,395 | 20.49 |
| Rex Takataveti | Union of Moderate Parties | 611 | 8.97 |
| Keith Wilson | Independent | 469 | 6.89 |
| Santus Wari | Nagriamel | 207 | 3.04 |
| Total | | 6,808 | 100.00 |
| Valid votes | | 6,808 | 99.85 |
| Invalid/blank votes | | 10 | 0.15 |
| Total votes | | 6,818 | 100.00 |
| Registered voters/turnout | | 12,480 | 54.63 |

Maewo
| Candidate | Party | Votes | % |
|---|---|---|---|
| Ian Toakalana Wilson | Ngwasoanda Custom Movement | 1,012 | 46.17 |
| Vanessa Molisa | Laverwo Party | 861 | 39.28 |
| Issen Vivi Gabani Tari | Vanua'aku Pati | 319 | 14.55 |
| Total | | 2,192 | 100.00 |
| Valid votes | | 2,192 | 99.68 |
| Invalid/blank votes | | 7 | 0.32 |
| Total votes | | 2,199 | 100.00 |
| Registered voters/turnout | | 2,850 | 77.16 |

Malekula
| Candidate | Party | Votes | % |
|---|---|---|---|
| Marcellino Barthelemy | Reunification Movement for Change | 1,836 | 11.51 |
| Jones Nalnimbwen | Leaders Party of Vanuatu | 1,149 | 7.21 |
| Hymak Anatole | Union of Moderate Parties | 1,059 | 6.64 |
| Micha Oliver | Rural Development Party | 883 | 5.54 |
| Gracia Shadrack | Rural Development Party | 861 | 5.40 |
| Terry Alick | Land and Justice Party | 756 | 4.74 |
| Paul Paolo | Land and Justice Party | 727 | 4.56 |
| Felix Fatdal | Vanua'aku Pati | 708 | 4.44 |
| Sanick Asang | National United Party | 691 | 4.33 |
| Esmon Esai Saimon | Vanua'aku Pati | 685 | 4.30 |
| Gregroir Nimbtik | Vanua'aku Pati | 663 | 4.16 |
| Charlie Maniel | Independent | 635 | 3.98 |
| Albert Slee | Independent | 574 | 3.60 |
| Warren Stephen Amrunnugh | Reunification Movement for Change | 567 | 3.56 |
| Romeo Leyrou | Union of Moderate Parties | 537 | 3.37 |
| Sato Kilman | People's Progressive Party | 511 | 3.20 |
| Jerome Ludvaune | Vanuatu National Development Party | 504 | 3.16 |
| Josey Avimbong | Movement for Righteousness, Peace and Justice | 461 | 2.89 |
| Clipson Jepeta Shadrack | Independent | 444 | 2.78 |
| Jack Whitley | Independent | 433 | 2.72 |
| Donald Restuetune | Democratic Aliance for Change | 360 | 2.26 |
| Don Ken Nmalamuwomu | Independent | 352 | 2.21 |
| Guytou Julun | Green Confederation | 261 | 1.64 |
| Gordon Regenvanu | Laverwo Party | 200 | 1.25 |
| Gordon Arnhambath | Vanua'aku Pati | 88 | 0.55 |
| Total | | 15,945 | 100.00 |
| Valid votes | | 15,945 | 99.76 |
| Invalid/blank votes | | 39 | 0.24 |
| Total votes | | 15,984 | 100.00 |
| Registered voters/turnout | | 23,532 | 67.92 |

Malo–Aore
| Candidate | Party | Votes | % |
|---|---|---|---|
| Allan Molvoke Liki | Union of Moderate Parties | 996 | 34.44 |
| Urinamoli Warawara | Land and Justice Party | 815 | 28.18 |
| Russel Taviri Tamata | Leaders Party of Vanuatu | 585 | 20.23 |
| Wesley Langi Rasu | Vanua'aku Pati | 496 | 17.15 |
| Total | | 2,892 | 100.00 |
| Valid votes | | 2,892 | 99.42 |
| Invalid/blank votes | | 17 | 0.58 |
| Total votes | | 2,909 | 100.00 |
| Registered voters/turnout | | 3,767 | 77.22 |

Paama
| Candidate | Party | Votes | % |
|---|---|---|---|
| Job Sam Andy | Leaders Party of Vanuatu | 236 | 31.42 |
| Nos Terry Mailalong | Vanua'aku Pati | 202 | 26.90 |
| Johnny Willie | Iauko Group | 147 | 19.57 |
| Jonas James | Vanuatu Progressive Development Party | 108 | 14.38 |
| Willie Colin Galeb | Union of Moderate Parties | 54 | 7.19 |
| Floyd Green Timothy Sovuai | Laverwo Party | 4 | 0.53 |
| Total | | 751 | 100.00 |
| Valid votes | | 751 | 99.73 |
| Invalid/blank votes | | 2 | 0.27 |
| Total votes | | 753 | 100.00 |
| Registered voters/turnout | | 1,159 | 64.97 |

Pentecost
| Candidate | Party | Votes | % |
|---|---|---|---|
| Blaise Sumtoh | Rural Development Party | 1,181 | 12.53 |
| Charlot Salwai | Reunification Movement for Change | 1,100 | 11.67 |
| Maty Phen Lange | National United Party | 825 | 8.75 |
| Marc Muelsul | Rural Development Party | 778 | 8.25 |
| Jean Baptist Saltukro | Reunification Movement for Change | 705 | 7.48 |
| Silas Bule Melve | National United Party | 594 | 6.30 |
| Norbert Sumsum Tawal | Oceania Transformation Movement | 580 | 6.15 |
| Keithson Liu | Iauko Group | 549 | 5.82 |
| Tensly Buleuru | Land and Justice Party | 542 | 5.75 |
| Demas Harry | Rural Development Party | 413 | 4.38 |
| Richard Leona | Reunification Movement for Change | 367 | 3.89 |
| Christopher Bogiri | Leaders Party of Vanuatu | 330 | 3.50 |
| Paul Tabinok Revurup | Vanua'aku Pati | 303 | 3.21 |
| Edward Wabak Tolak | People's Unity Development Party | 292 | 3.10 |
| Melsul Joe Tema | Independent | 283 | 3.00 |
| Silas Tarilalau Aru | Laverwo Party | 195 | 2.07 |
| Daison Nari | Tohurihuri Movement | 160 | 1.70 |
| Wilton Tor | Leaders Party of Vanuatu | 97 | 1.03 |
| Noel Warry Bebe | Union of Moderate Parties | 94 | 1.00 |
| McDonald Tabi Bule | Wan Nakamal | 38 | 0.40 |
| Total | | 9,426 | 100.00 |
| Valid votes | | 9,426 | 99.59 |
| Invalid/blank votes | | 39 | 0.41 |
| Total votes | | 9,465 | 100.00 |
| Registered voters/turnout | | 13,204 | 71.68 |

Port Vila
| Candidate | Party | Votes | % |
|---|---|---|---|
| Alatoi Ishmael Kalsakau | Union of Moderate Parties | 2,220 | 11.86 |
| Ralph Regenvanu | Land and Justice Party | 1,895 | 10.12 |
| Jackson Lessa | Leaders Party of Vanuatu | 1,346 | 7.19 |
| Harry Anthony Iarrish | Union of Moderate Parties | 1,306 | 6.97 |
| Marie Louise Paulette Milne | Green Confederation | 1,227 | 6.55 |
| Tony George Yasyas Ailir | Reunification Movement for Change | 1,197 | 6.39 |
| James Tari | Independent | 1,066 | 5.69 |
| Gerard Metsan | Reunification Movement for Change | 1,028 | 5.49 |
| Sumptoh Ulrich Tabimamkan | National United Party | 965 | 5.15 |
| Albea Nalisa | Vanua'aku Pati | 813 | 4.34 |
| Erick Iani | Union of Moderate Parties | 774 | 4.13 |
| David Natuman Fred | Vanua'aku Pati | 662 | 3.54 |
| Natonga Saby | Union of Moderate Parties | 615 | 3.28 |
| Mike Esrom Kaun | Independent | 441 | 2.36 |
| Joshua Hiroshi Taufura Kalsakau | Rural Development Party | 422 | 2.25 |
| Fred Jureti Vurobaravu | Vanua'aku Pati | 378 | 2.02 |
| Harry Tele Ramby | Vanua'aku Pati | 295 | 1.58 |
| Christian Tari | Independent | 262 | 1.40 |
| Erickson Restuetune | Democratic Aliance for Change | 261 | 1.39 |
| Tony Sawte Atnelo | Movement for Righteousness, Peace and Justice | 227 | 1.21 |
| Basil Hopkins | Independent | 213 | 1.14 |
| Donald Chedrack | Independent | 211 | 1.13 |
| Sowany Joseph Nasaganamu | Independent | 202 | 1.08 |
| Christopher Joseph Kernot | Wan Nakamal | 178 | 0.95 |
| Stephen Kalo | Independent | 165 | 0.88 |
| Norah Leipakoa Wells | Vanuatu Self Reliance Party | 144 | 0.77 |
| Joel Langlois | People's Unity Development Party | 62 | 0.33 |
| Williams Ganileo | Independent | 37 | 0.20 |
| Ruben Markward Bakeo | Independent | 35 | 0.19 |
| Henri Manarewo Maximo dit Crowby | People's Progressive Party | 33 | 0.18 |
| Enock Meltesale | Independent | 27 | 0.14 |
| Silas Rouard Yatan | Vanuatu National Development Party | 18 | 0.10 |
| Total | | 18,725 | 100.00 |
| Valid votes | | 18,725 | 99.63 |
| Invalid/blank votes | | 70 | 0.37 |
| Total votes | | 18,795 | 100.00 |
| Registered voters/turnout | | 29,391 | 63.95 |

Santo
| Candidate | Party | Votes | % |
|---|---|---|---|
| Mahe Rick Tchamako | Reunification Movement for Change | 2,479 | 10.40 |
| Frankly Ezra William | Reunification Movement for Change | 2,165 | 9.08 |
| John Lum | Nagriamel | 1,899 | 7.97 |
| Gaetan Pikioune | Independent | 1,844 | 7.74 |
| Samson Samsen | Vanua'aku Pati | 1,461 | 6.13 |
| Robson Nalan Iavro | Vanua'aku Pati | 1,458 | 6.12 |
| Camillo Ati | Iauko Group | 1,335 | 5.60 |
| Pikioune Joshua Leonard Clement | Nagriamel | 996 | 4.18 |
| Kenneth Saul | Union of Moderate Parties | 980 | 4.11 |
| Hanold Ralf | Union of Moderate Parties | 947 | 3.97 |
| Laurant Almele | Leaders Party of Vanuatu | 905 | 3.80 |
| Sakaes Lulu | Rural Development Party | 878 | 3.68 |
| Michael Rite | Independent | 782 | 3.28 |
| Alfred Maoh | Land and Justice Party | 745 | 3.13 |
| Peter James Vari | Laverwo Party | 708 | 2.97 |
| Ravou Akii Kolomoule Jean | Independent | 577 | 2.42 |
| Mackenzie Olomele | People's Progressive Party | 486 | 2.04 |
| Jean Kendy Singo | Iauko Group | 486 | 2.04 |
| Bob Vusitarione | Vanuatu Economic and Industrial Party | 482 | 2.02 |
| Ronald Kay Waluceth Warsal | Vanua'aku Pati | 457 | 1.92 |
| Tiroles Jean Jacques Maliu | Leaders Party of Vanuatu | 420 | 1.76 |
| Erick Maliu Letlet | Vanua'aku Pati | 353 | 1.48 |
| Lulu Baia | Independent | 301 | 1.26 |
| Hosea Nevu | Union of Moderate Parties | 297 | 1.25 |
| Jean Vincent Charley | National United Party | 223 | 0.94 |
| Timothy Ian Pune | Democratic Aliance for Change | 106 | 0.44 |
| Alfred Lily | Chief Indigenous People's Party | 67 | 0.28 |
| Total | | 23,837 | 100.00 |
| Valid votes | | 23,837 | 99.66 |
| Invalid/blank votes | | 82 | 0.34 |
| Total votes | | 23,919 | 100.00 |
| Registered voters/turnout | | 30,087 | 79.50 |

Shepherds
| Candidate | Party | Votes | % |
|---|---|---|---|
| John William Timakata | Vanua'aku Pati | 272 | 26.08 |
| Madeleine Tom | Vanuatu Progressive Development Party | 187 | 17.93 |
| George Kaltara Amos | People's Unity Development Party | 178 | 17.07 |
| Willie Pakoa Saatearoto | Green Confederation | 168 | 16.11 |
| Harrison Luen | Reunification Movement for Change | 141 | 13.52 |
| Willie Sutan Kalo | Laverwo Party | 96 | 9.20 |
| Firiam Maripu Babtiste | Movement for Righteousness, Peace and Justice | 1 | 0.10 |
| Total | | 1,043 | 100.00 |
| Valid votes | | 1,043 | 100.00 |
| Invalid/blank votes | | 0 | 0.00 |
| Total votes | | 1,043 | 100.00 |
| Registered voters/turnout | | 1,262 | 82.65 |

Southern Islands
| Candidate | Party | Votes | % |
|---|---|---|---|
| Netvunei Tomker | Leaders Party of Vanuatu | 1,053 | 40.75 |
| Shing Benjamin Benny Benvolio Francis | Vanua'aku Pati | 886 | 34.29 |
| Martín David Nilwo | Union of Moderate Parties | 637 | 24.65 |
| Donald Serel | Reunification Movement for Change | 8 | 0.31 |
| Total | | 2,584 | 100.00 |
| Valid votes | | 2,584 | 99.58 |
| Invalid/blank votes | | 11 | 0.42 |
| Total votes | | 2,595 | 100.00 |
| Registered voters/turnout | | 3,401 | 76.30 |

Tanna
| Candidate | Party | Votes | % |
|---|---|---|---|
| Jotham Napat | Leaders Party of Vanuatu | 2,300 | 10.99 |
| Johny Koanapo Rasou | Vanua'aku Pati | 1,950 | 9.32 |
| Harry Xavier Emanuel | Iauko Group | 1,687 | 8.06 |
| James Naumeta | Leaders Party of Vanuatu | 1,614 | 7.71 |
| Andrew Wilbur Napuat | Union of Moderate Parties | 1,446 | 6.91 |
| Simil Kalptu Johnson Youse | Vanua'aku Pati | 1,291 | 6.17 |
| Andrew Solomon Napuat | Land and Justice Party | 1,283 | 6.13 |
| Nako Ianatom Natuman | Union of Moderate Parties | 1,197 | 5.72 |
| Bob Weibur Loughman | Vanua'aku Pati | 1,089 | 5.20 |
| Daniel Kamisak | Union of Moderate Parties | 1,064 | 5.08 |
| Robin Kapapa Tom | Union of Moderate Parties | 959 | 4.58 |
| Natonga Colin Jacques | Union of Moderate Parties | 834 | 3.99 |
| Peter Pata | Reunification Movement for Change | 820 | 3.92 |
| John Junior Ierongen | Independent | 691 | 3.30 |
| Willie Jack Kapalu | Vanuatu Economic and Industrial Party | 600 | 2.87 |
| Joe Natuman | Vanua'aku Pati | 578 | 2.76 |
| Thomas Lakin | Reunification Movement for Change | 480 | 2.29 |
| Ken Olul Nalau | Independent | 394 | 1.88 |
| Peter Nauanikam Napwatt | Vanua'aku Pati | 332 | 1.59 |
| Jerry Irira Lawrence | Reunification Movement for Change | 232 | 1.11 |
| Thomas Newton Joseph | Vanuatu National Custom Governance Party | 79 | 0.38 |
| Johna Tapua Iaru | Democratic Aliance for Change | 8 | 0.04 |
| Total | | 20,928 | 100.00 |
| Valid votes | | 20,928 | 99.75 |
| Invalid/blank votes | | 52 | 0.25 |
| Total votes | | 20,980 | 100.00 |
| Registered voters/turnout | | 27,954 | 75.05 |

Tongoa
| Candidate | Party | Votes | % |
|---|---|---|---|
| John Vacher Amos | Namarakieana Movement | 462 | 39.45 |
| Willie Daniel Kalo | Union of Moderate Parties | 281 | 24.00 |
| Noel Karie Timatua | Independent | 200 | 17.08 |
| Sakarai Toara | Independent | 169 | 14.43 |
| Roger Daniel | Laverwo Party | 38 | 3.25 |
| Thomson Pakoa Matokai Kokona | People's Unity Development Party | 21 | 1.79 |
| Total | | 1,171 | 100.00 |
| Valid votes | | 1,171 | 99.57 |
| Invalid/blank votes | | 5 | 0.43 |
| Total votes | | 1,176 | 100.00 |
| Registered voters/turnout | | 1,621 | 72.55 |

Torres
| Candidate | Party | Votes | % |
|---|---|---|---|
| John Joseph | Vanua'aku Pati | 1,024 | 46.42 |
| Claude Christophe A. Emelee | Vanuatu National Development Party | 913 | 41.39 |
| Arthur Kete | Leaders Party of Vanuatu | 269 | 12.19 |
| Total | | 2,206 | 100.00 |
| Valid votes | | 2,206 | 99.46 |
| Invalid/blank votes | | 12 | 0.54 |
| Total votes | | 2,218 | 100.00 |
| Registered voters/turnout | | 2,937 | 75.52 |
