= NCM =

NCM may refer to:

== Organizations ==
- National CineMedia, an American cinema advertising company
- New Communist movement, a 1970s and 1980s American political movement
- Newcrest Mining (ASX trading symbol), an Australian-based corporation
- Ngwasoanda Custom Movement, political party in Vanuatu
- News Center Maine, a news station in Portland, ME

== Military ==
- National Cryptologic Museum, in the US
- Navy and Marine Corps Commendation Medal, a US Commendation Medal
- Non-commissioned member, of the Canadian Armed Forces

== Science and technology ==
- Newton centimetre (N·cm or N cm), a subunit of torque
- Lithium nickel manganese cobalt oxides, a type of lithium-ion battery technology (such as NCM811), abbreviated NMC, (or Li-NMC, LNMC), or NCM, when fractions (of the non-lithium metals) are not implied by following numbers

== Other uses ==
- North Camp railway station (station code), England
