= Elections in Vanuatu =

Vanuatu elects on the national level a head of state—the president—and a legislature. The Parliament or Parlement has 52 members, elected for a four-year term in eight single-member constituencies and ten multi-member constituencies (of between two and seven seats) by first-past-the-post and single non-transferable vote, respectively. The president is elected for a five-year term by an electoral college consisting of members of Parliament and the Presidents of Regional Councils.

== Political culture ==
Vanuatu has a multi-party system, with numerous parties in which no one party gains power alone, and parties must work with each other to form coalition governments. Since 2004, no party has won more than 16% of votes, and no party has won more than 22 percent of the seats.

== Latest elections ==
See 2012 Vanuatuan general election.
See 2016 Vanuatuan general election.
See 2020 Vanuatuan general election.
See 2022 Vanuatuan general election.
See 2025 Vanuatuan general election.

== See also ==
- List of political parties in Vanuatu
