= Lycée de Montmartre =

French-speaking secondary school in Vanuatu

Lycée de Montmartre is a French-language secondary school in Port Vila, Vanuatu.

The Brothers of the Sacred Heart established the school. As of 2015, its annual budget was 50 million Vanuatu vatus (459,000 euros).

It was heavily damaged by Cyclone Pam in 2015. An agreement between the Vanuatuan government, local authorities, and the French government meant that the school received 25 million vatus towards its reconstruction. The girls' dormitory, damaged by the cyclone, was renovated and reopened in 2016.
