= Namarakieana Movement =

Political party in Vanuatu

The Namarakieana Movement (NM) is a political party in Vanuatu.

== History ==
One member was elected to the Parliament of Vanuatu in the 2025 Vanuatuan general election, John Amos. Following the election, Amos affiliated with the Leaders Party of Vanuatu in accordance with the results of the 2024 Vanuatuan constitutional referendum.

== Election results ==
| Election | Votes | Vote % | Seats | Seat change |
|---|---|---|---|---|
| 2022 | 842 | 0.64 | 1 | ▲1 |
| 2025 | 462 | 0.32 | 1 | Steady |
