= Gloria Julia King =

Ni-Vanuatu athlete and politician

Member of the Parliament of Vanuatu
- In office October 13, 2022 – February 11, 2025
- Constituency: Efate

Personal details
- Party: Union of Moderate Parties

Gloria Julia King is a footballer, businesswoman, and politician in Vanuatu. In 2022, she was elected to the Parliament of Vanuatu, where she served until 2025. She was only the sixth woman in the country to become a member of Parliament.

== Biography ==
Gloria Julia King is Ni-Vanuatu from the Vanuatuan islet of Mele. She is a former member of the Vanuatu women's national football team and represented Vanuatu at the 2003 South Pacific Games. She has since served as a football coach and manager, and as the chef de mission for the Vanuatuan delegation at the 2022 Commonwealth Games. Also a businesswoman, she runs a company selling kava, a popular and ritually important beverage.

King first became involved in politics when she joined efforts to establish a village water system in Mele.

In the 2022 Vanuatuan general election, she ran for a seat in the rural Efate constituency as a candidate from the Union of Moderate Parties. Her campaign included a commitment to improve opportunities for women in business. She was elected with 1,618 votes, becoming only the sixth woman to become a member of Parliament in Vanuatu, and the first in 14 years.

King served as the only woman in the 52-member Parliament, and she was the first woman to hold the position of third deputy speaker, a position she lost during the 2023 political shakeup. In the 2025 Vanuatuan general election, she failed to win re-election.
