= Vanuatu Liberal Movement =

Political party in Vanuatu

- Abbreviation: VLM
- President: Gaetan Pikioune
- Founded: 2019
- Ideology: Liberalism

The Vanuatu Liberal Movement (VLM) is a political party in Vanuatu.

== History ==
In 2019, the party was co-founded by Gaetan Pikioune.

== Election results ==
Election	Votes	%	Seats	+/–
2020	3,147	2.19	1	New
2022	1,002	0.76	1	0

== See also ==
- List of political parties in Vanuatu
