= Ngwasoanda Custom Movement =

Political party in Vanuatu

The Ngwasoanda Custom Movement (NCM) is a political party in Vanuatu.

== History ==
One member was elected to the Parliament of Vanuatu in the 2025 Vanuatuan general election, Ian Wilson. Following the election, Wilson affiliated with the Leaders Party of Vanuatu in accordance with the results of the 2024 Vanuatuan constitutional referendum.

== Election results ==
Election	Votes	Vote %	Seats	Seat change
2020	1,300	0.90	1	▲1
2022	868	0.66	1	Steady
2025	1,012	0.69	1	Steady
