= Sanick Asang =

Vanuatuan politician

The Honourable Sanick Asang MP

MP for Malakula
- In office 2020–2022

Sanick Asang is a Vanuatuan politician and a member of the Parliament of Vanuatu from Malakula.
