= Gaetan Pikioune =

Vanuatuan politician

The Honourable Gaetan Pikioune MP
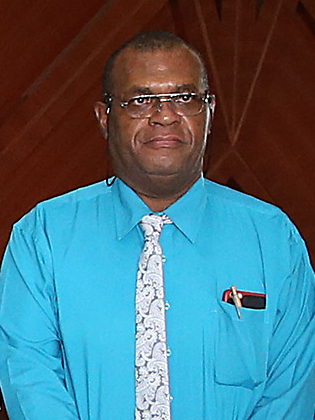
- Pikioune in 2016

Minister of Finance of Vanuatu
- In office 11 February 2016 – 20 April 2020
- Preceded by: Willie Jimmy
- Succeeded by: Johnny Koanapo Rasou

MP for Espiritu Santo
- In office 2020–2022

Personal details
- Born: 6 July 1965 (age 60)
- Party: Reunification Movement for Change
- Other political affiliations: Independent (?–2025); Vanuatu Liberal Movement (2019–?); Nagriamel (?-2018)

Gaetan Pikioune (born 1965) or Pikinoune is a Vanuatuan politician and a member of the Parliament of Vanuatu from Espiritu Santo. He was a member of the Nagriamel movement, before being expelled in 2018. In 2019 he co-founded the Vanuatu Liberal Movement. In 2025 he was elected to parliament as an independent, and then joined the Reunification Movement for Change. He was Minister of Finance from February 2016 to April 2020.
