= Laverwo Party =

Political party in Vanuatu

- Parliament: 1 / 52

The Laverwo Party is a political party in Vanuatu.

== History ==
The Laverwo Party had nine candidates in the 2025 Vanuatuan general election. One member was elected to the Parliament of Vanuatu.
