= James Bule =

Vanuatuan politician

The Honourable James Bule MP

MP for Ambae
- In office 2020–2022
- In office 1998–2016

Personal details
- Born: 14 July 1947 (age 78)
- Political party: People's Unity Development Party

James Bule is a Vanuatuan politician and a member of the Parliament of Vanuatu from Ambae as a member of the People's Unity Development Party.

He was Minister of Justice and Community Services briefly in 2023.
