= Rural Development Party (Vanuatu) =

Political party in Vanuatu

- Abbreviation: RDP
- Leader: Jay Ngwele
- Founder: Tony Ngari
- Founded: 11 December 2014 (IG faction); 15 January 2020 (separate party)
- Split from: Iauko Group
- Ideology: Agrarianism
- Colours: Turquoise
- Parliament: 6 / 52

Website
- Facebook page

The Rural Development Party (RDP) is a political party in Vanuatu. It was formed as a renaming of the Iauko Group (IG) in 2014 and then as a separate party in 2020.

== Background ==
On 11 December 2014, two years after the death of founder Harry Iauko, the Iauko Group (IG) was also known as the Rural Development Party (RDP). MPs in 2015 that associated with RDP included: Tony Ngari (party leader), Hosea Nevu, Thomas Laken. John Amos, Jonas James, and Pascal Iauko. MPs Samsen Samson and Havo Moli have also declared affiliations with RDP. The party supported the governments of Sato Kilman

In 2017, RDP members signed a solidarity pact with the Leaders Party of Vanuatu (LPV) in front of Prime Minister Charlot Salwai, reaffirming support for the coalition government. Members at that time included MP Jay Ngwele, Tom Nouam and Kalo Pakoa. They also supported the Vanua'aku Pati (VP) in 2018.

The CIA World Factbook 2016-2019 profiles show they were still part of IG.

== Split from Iauko Group ==
In January 2020, Ngwele resigned as MP and would be later appointed in April to then Minister of Infrastructure and Public Utilities in prime minister Bob Loughman's administration. For the 2020 Vanuatuan general election, they ran as a separate party from Iauko Group.

On 18 October 2022, following the general election, which was a snap election, it was reported that RDP, IG, VP, and National United Party (NUP) were not included in the signing of the pact for the new government formation.
