= Iauko Group =

Eagle Group Iauko Grup
- Abbreviation: IG
- Leader: Marc Ati
- Founder: Harry Iauko
- Founded: 12 April 2012
- Split from: Vanua'aku Pati
- Colours: Blue
- Slogan: Unity for All!
- Parliament: 6 / 52

Website
- Facebook page

The Iauko Group (Bislama: Iauko Grup) or Eagle Group is a political party in Vanuatu.

== History ==
The party was established by Harry Iauko after he left the Vanua'aku Pati prior to the 2012 general elections. The party nominated six candidates, winning three of the 52 seats in Parliament; Tony Nari in Pentecost, Hosea Nevu in Santo and Iauko in Tanna. Iauko died in December 2012, but the subsequent by-election was won by his son Pascal Iauko. However, he lost his seat in parliament in 2015 after being convicted of bribery.

In October 2013, the Iauko Group, under the leadership of Tony Nari, supported the Vanua'aku Pati, and joined Prime Minister Carcasses' parliamentary majority.

=== Rural Development Party ===
On 11 December 2014, two years after the death of founder Harry Iauko, the Iauko Group was also known as the Rural Development Party (RDP). MPs in 2015 that associated with RDP included: Tony Ngari (party leader), Hosea Nevu, Thomas Laken. John Amos, Jonas James, and Pascal Iauko. MPs Samsen Samson and Havo Moli have also declared affiliations with RDP. The party supported the governments of Sato Kilman

In the 2016 elections the party fielded eight candidates, winning four seats; Nevu was re-elected in Santo, Marc Ati was elected in Luganville, Jay Ngwele in Ambae and Kalo Pakoa Songi Lano in Tongoa.

In 2017, RDP members signed a solidarity pact with the Leaders Party of Vanuatu (LPV) in front of Prime Minister Charlot Salwai, reaffirming support for the coalition government. Members at that time included MP Jay Ngwele, Tom Nouam and Kalo Pakoa. They also supported the Vanua'aku Pati (VP) in 2018.

According to the World Factbook IG and RDP were listed as the same party IG from 2016 to 2019.

=== Split from RDP ===
In 2020, the RDP and IG ran their own candidates for the 2020 Vanuatuan general election.

In 18 October 2022, following the 2022 Vanuatuan general election, which was a snap election, it was reported that RDP, IG, VP, and National United Party (NUP) were not included in the signing of the pact for the new government formation.

== Election results ==
=== Parliament ===
Election	Leader	Votes	%	Seats	+/–	Status
2012	Harry Iauko	4,425	3.68 (#8)	3 / 52	New	Opposition
2016	Harry Iauko	4,979	4.40 (#6)	4 / 52	▲1	Opposition
2020	Harry Iauko	2,847	1.98 (#12)	2 / 52	▼2	Coalition
2022	Marc Ati	8,093	6.12 (#7)	3 / 52	▲1	Opposition
2025	Marc Ati	9,383	6.42 (#6)	6 / 52	▲3	Coalition
