= Reunification Movement for Change =

- Abbreviation: RMC
- President: Charlot Salwai
- Founded: 2012
- Preceded by: Namangi Aute
- Ideology: Cultural conservatism Francophonie
- Political position: Centre-right
- Colours: Orange; Black
- Parliament: 5 / 52

Website
- Facebook page

The Reunification Movement for Change (sometimes written as the Reunification of Movements for Change) is a political party in Vanuatu resulting from a split in the Union of Moderate Parties in 2012. At the 2016 election the party won 3.44% of the vote and 3 seats, resulting in its leader Charlot Salwai being appointed Prime Minister. The party was also included in the governing coalitions that emerged from the two following elections, in 2020 and 2022, where it won 7 and 5 seats respectively.

== Election results ==
Parliament
Election	Leader	Votes	%	Seats	+/–	Government
2012	Paul Telukluk	6,921	5.75 (#6)	3 / 52	New	Opposition
2016	Charlot Salwai	8,376	3.44 (#10)	3 / 52	0	Coalition
2020	Charlot Salwai	16,298	11.32 (#3)	7 / 52	▲4	Coalition
2022	Charlot Salwai	9,830	7.43 (#5)	5 / 52	▼2	Coalition
2025	Charlot Salwai	17,119	11.72 (#3)	5 / 52	0	Coalition

== See also ==
- Category:Reunification Movement for Change politicians
