= Jay Ngwele =

Vanuatuan politician

The Honourable Jay Ngwele MP
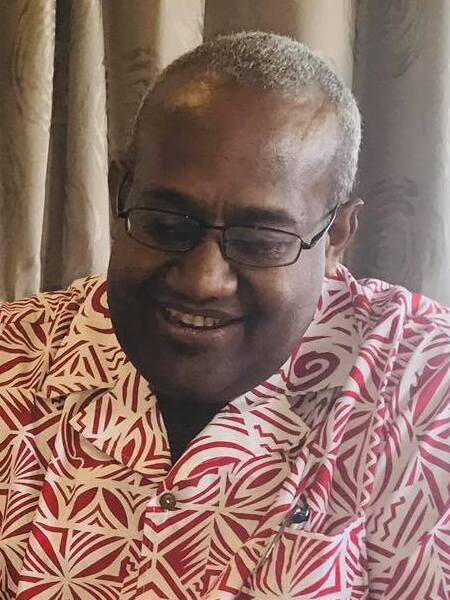
- Ngwele in 2020

MP for Ambae
- In office 2016–2022

Personal details
- Born: 5 April 1973 (age 53)
- Party: Rural Development Party

Jay Ngwele is a Vanuatuan politician and a member of the Parliament of Vanuatu from Ambae as a member of the Rural Development Party.
