= Norman C. Deck =

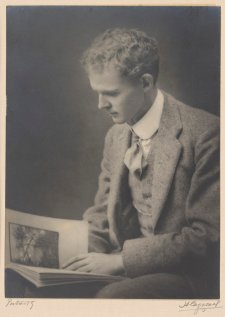
- Norman C Deck by Harold Cazneaux c. 1905
- Born: Norman Cathcart Deck; 29 May 1882; Sydney, Australia
- Died: 1980 (aged 97–98)
- Occupations: Photographer, Missionary & Dentist
- Spouse: Mary Maltby

Norman Cathcart Deck (1882 – 1980) was an Australian photographer, dentist and missionary.

== Early life ==
Deck was born in Sydney, Australia on 29 May 1882 to Dr John Feild Deck and Emily (née Young, elder sister of missionary Florence Young). Deck's grandfather was evangelist James George Deck, who had emigrated from England to New Zealand with his family, including his son John Feild Deck, in 1853. John Feild Deck and Emily Baring Young married in New Zealand in 1865, and in 1877 moved from New Zealand to Australia with their family, settling in Sydney. Four of John and Emily's sons became doctors, and seven of their eleven children became missionaries: five with the South Sea Evangelical Mission (SSEM) and two with other missions.

Norman Deck first learnt photography from his elder brother John Northcote Deck who let him watch as he developed a print. He then developed his knowledge throughout his schooling at Sydney Grammar School. In 1896, aged 14, he became the youngest ever member of the Photographic Society of New South Wales. In 1906 he won his first gold medal for a photograph entitled "Where Two Paths Meet" (Five Docks).

Deck graduated from Sydney University in 1906 as a Bachelor of Dentistry and began practising in Cowra, New South Wales. During 1909 Deck returned to Sydney to begin a practice with his brother.

== Missionary work ==
Deck's aunt Florence Young set up the South Sea Evangelical Mission in the Solomon Islands in 1904, and in 1909 was joined by Northcote Deck, Norman Deck's brother. Norman Deck first visited the Solomon Islands when he was asked to go and tend to the teeth of the missionaries there, who included his family members. Deck said that the situation there made such an impression on him that he gave up his dental practice in Sydney and became a missionary.

Norman Deck's missionary work began in 1914 and spanned two world wars: the total length of his term was 34 years. He made infrequent returns to Australia during his term in the Solomon Islands. On one trip back to Sydney a disaster occurred in which almost all of his photographs were washed overboard. As part of his work in the Solomon Islands, Deck translated the New Testament from Greek into the native dialect. In 1948, aged 66, Deck retired and returned to Sydney to live, continuing his religious studies.

== Photographic style ==
Deck took many trips overseas, mainly to New Zealand, and he also practised in the Solomon Islands and developed countless photographs while working as a missionary. Most of Deck's photographs are "ethereal and romantic" landscapes. Many of his earlier prints were destroyed in the tropical climate of the Solomon Islands. After returning to Sydney he reproduced many of his original prints, but they took on a different appearance due to certain papers and techniques no longer being available. His negatives were donated to the Art Gallery of New South Wales. Deck had quite an eye for good composition, even before the management of his prints. In 1978 he stated: "I'm out of fashion. I don't mind admitting it. Modern photography – where they always seem to take stunts – is good. But frankly it leaves me cold. I like something that is inherently beautiful".

== Exhibitions ==
Deck started exhibiting around 1903. Records from the State Library of Victoria state that Deck had his first major exhibition at Harrington's in Sydney in 1912; however, a significant fire caused most of his prints from that exhibition to be destroyed.

In 1951, Deck exhibited 80 photographs "notable for technical perfection and masterly conception" at Queen Victoria Museum in Launceston, Tasmania. Deck also had an exhibition at the Church Street Photographic Centre in Melbourne from 7 September to 8 October 1978. In this exhibition 40 of Deck's photographs were on show, dating back as far as 1894. These prints were "a reflection of his career over 84 years". This exhibition took place when Deck was 96 years old. He died two years later at the age of 98.

== Gallery ==
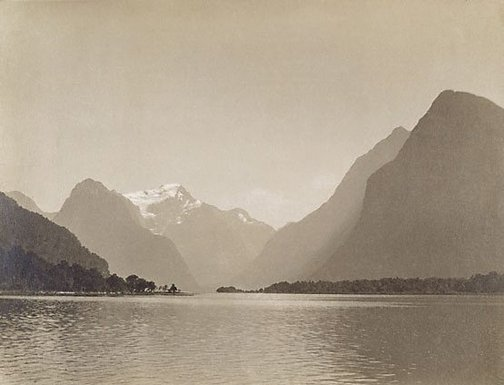
Mount Pembroke, Milford Sound

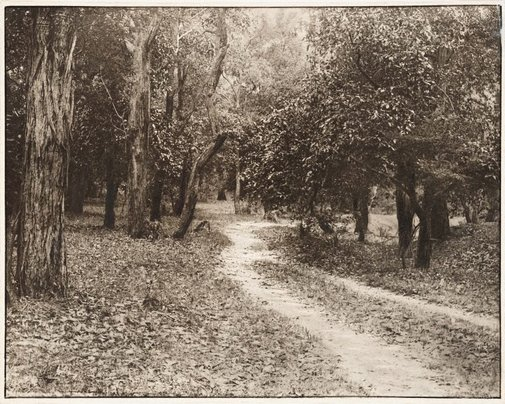
Where two paths meet, (Five Dock) c1905

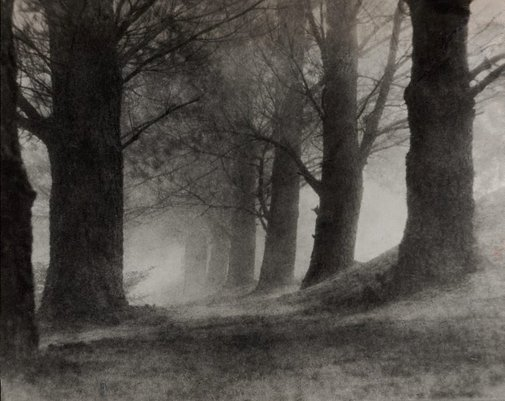
Nature's Cathedral (Khandalah, Katoomba)

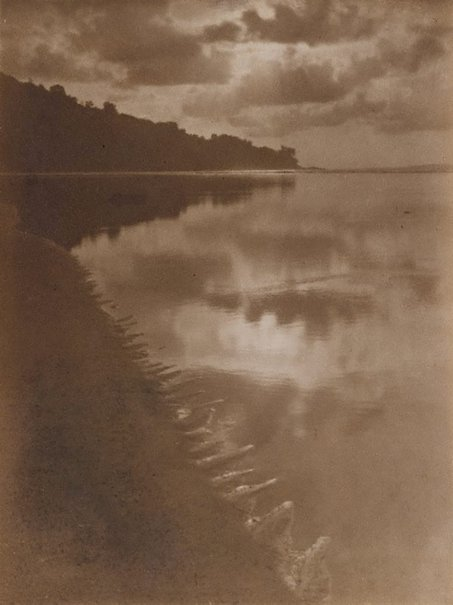
Sand Pattern 1905-1910
