= Christian Community Churches of New Zealand =

Network of churches in New Zealand

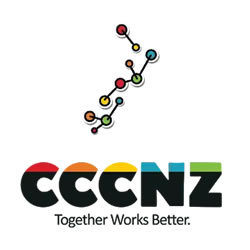
- Classification: Protestant
- Orientation: Plymouth Brethren
- Polity: Congregationalist
- Region: New Zealand
- Founder: James George Deck
- Origin: 1863; Ngātīmoti
- Separated from: Exclusive Brethren/PBCC, 1875
- Congregations: 202
- Members: 16,164 (including children)
- Missionaries: 150
- Official website: cccnz.nz

The Christian Community Churches of New Zealand (formerly known as the Christian Brethren Church of New Zealand) is the name by which some churches in the Open Brethren movement in New Zealand are now publicly known. They adopted the new name, as did their counterparts in Australia (the Christian Community Churches of Australia) to avoid confusion with the similarly named Plymouth Brethren Christian Church.

It is not a denomination in the organizational sense, but a loose network of like-minded autonomous local churches, or "assemblies", as Brethren churches are generally known. According to the Evangelical publication, Operation World, there are 202 Brethren congregations in New Zealand with 16,164 in regular attendance (including children). Some Brethren sources claim this number to be an underestimate, with internal surveys indicating as many as 38,000 adults and children attending Brethren assemblies — almost one percent of New Zealand's population.

== History ==
The history of the Brethren movement in New Zealand is unusual in that the schism between the Exclusive Brethren and the Open Brethren effectively occurred much later than elsewhere. The evangelist and hymn-writer James George Deck arrived in New Zealand in 1853 and established the first formal Brethren assembly at Ngātīmoti, near Nelson, on 1 January 1863, although historian Peter Lineham believes that Christians had already been meeting informally on Brethren lines in nearby Motueka for some time. Although he was associated with the Exclusive Brethren of John Nelson Darby, he decided that the schism that had taken place in 1848 was irrelevant to New Zealand. Unlike Darby, he did not believe in maintaining insularity from non-Brethren Christians, and preached in churches of many denominations. He also allowed the New Zealand assemblies a degree of congregational autonomy that was unknown among the Exclusives in the British Isles.

The slow pace of communication between the British Isles and the far-flung colony of New Zealand allowed Deck to operate more or less independently. When his son, John Field Deck returned to England in 1859 to study Medicine, however, and gravitated towards the Open Brethren, Exclusive leaders, including Darby, became concerned. Ship visits to New Zealand became increasingly frequent in the 1860s, and Exclusives back in the British Isles began to hear reports that the New Zealand Brethren were deviating from accepted norms. Consequently, George Wigram, who had a reputation for enforcing discipline among Exclusive Brethren, visited New Zealand from 14 January 1874 to 20 January 1875. This was followed up by a visit by Darby himself later in 1875. The result was a schism not only between different assemblies, but also within many of them. Forced against his will to take sides, Deck remained with the Exclusives, but his family was divided. Many independent assemblies were formed, which gradually coalesced into a network that became known as the Open Brethren.

Meanwhile, Gordon Forlong, a Scottish lawyer turned evangelist who had played a prominent role in the Second Great Awakening in Scotland around 1859-1860 and had subsequently moved to England and founded a large congregation, Talbot Tabernacle, in Notting Hill, London, emigrated to New Zealand in 1876, where he spent the final thirty-two years of his life. Apart from a three-year period (1880-1883) in Dunedin, Forlong based himself in the Whanganui/Manawatū region. Although he did not commit himself exclusively to the Brethren movement, his former steward, James Chrystall helped organize his converts into Brethren assemblies, which expanded from the Whanganui/Manawatū area.

== Recent and current issues ==
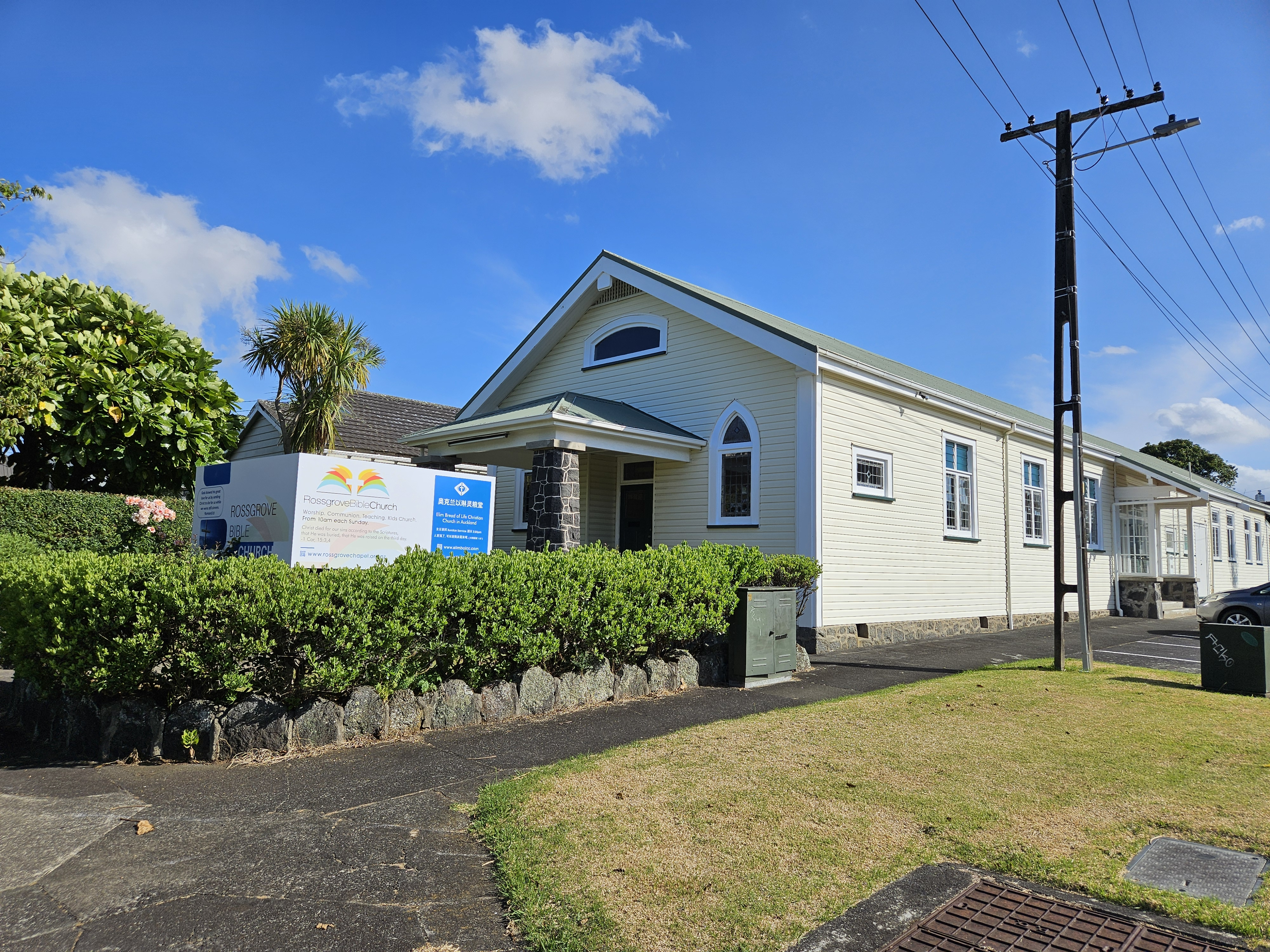
Rossgrove Bible Chapel in Mount Albert, Auckland

=== The Brethren and the Charismatic movement ===
The Charismatic movement has been very controversial in Brethren circles. Brethren were long noted for teaching cessationism — the idea that the so-called sign gifts (such as miracles, divine healing, and speaking in tongues) were given only to the early church to authenticate the apostles, and "ceased" with the death of the last apostle. Visits to New Zealand by British Brethren preachers Campbell McAlpine and Arthur Wallis in the late 1950s and early 1960s caused a great deal of controversy. Although widely welcomed at first, both found themselves increasingly isolated as their Charismatic sympathies became known and Brethren leaders like Robert Laidlaw, William H. Pettit, Enoch Coppin, Colin Graham, and Ces Hilton, along with J. Foster Crane, a missionary to Fiji, closed ranks to oppose what they stood for. McAlpine and Wallis both returned to the United Kingdom, and subsequently left the Brethren movement to help found the House Church Movement. Brethren leaders throughout New Zealand unanimously rejected the Charismatic movement in 1964, and decided that the assembly at Te Papapa, Māngere, which had endorsed the view that all spiritual gifts were operating today, would no longer be "recognized" as a Brethren assembly. At a conference at Howe Street Chapel on 21 November that year, leading Brethren from throughout New Zealand signed a statement declaring in part:

"Those members of this assembly who in any way hold the signs gifts ... or those who associate with people who hold these views, are not to take part in any assembly gathering or activities, whether in the remembrance meeting of a Sunday morning, the Sunday School, the rallies, the women's meeting, or any other activity at all, until they are freed from their error to the satisfaction of responsible brethren .... If ... brethren and sisters continue to fellowship with other professing Christians who hold and practise the sign-gifts they will have to withdraw ... because we will have nothing to do with these practices."

Signs of a thaw in attitudes began to appear in the late 1970s. When Te Atatu Bible Chapel embraced the Charismatic movement in 1978, it was not treated as the Te Papapa assembly had been almost fifteen years earlier. It remained within the Brethren movement. It was an isolated case, however; not until the early 2000s would there be any significant evidence of a Charismatic movement among Brethren assemblies throughout New Zealand. Attitudes since have become much more diverse, however. Complete rejection, and uncritical acceptance, of this movement are both minority positions among New Zealand Brethren today. Assemblies affirming a continuationist position (that all gifts of the Holy Spirit are operating today) include Street City Church in Wellington, Life Church, Manurewa in Auckland, Tasman Church and Hope Community Church in Nelson. Assemblies affirming a cessationist position include The Orchard in Te Puke, Bethany Bible Chapel in Auckland, and Onekawa Bible Church in Napier.

== Brethren institutions ==
As a network rather than an organization, the Christian Community Churches of New Zealand do not own or run any institutions. There are, however, a number of organizations, trusts, and support agencies that have been set up with the purpose of servicing Brethren (and sometimes like-minded) churches. The following are some of the institutions that are widely supported by Brethren assemblies in New Zealand.

=== Stewards Trust and Stewards Foundation ===
The Stewards Trust and Stewards Foundation are two separate, but closely related, organizations with identical membership. The Stewards' trust was established in 1919 to provide financial support to Brethren assemblies, and currently owns around 150 of the 200-odd Brethren assembly properties in New Zealand. The Stewards' Foundation, established in 1955, lends money to Brethren assemblies, institutions, workers, and missionaries.

=== GPH Society ===
What later became the GPH Society Limited originated in May 1900 when Edward Whitehead opened the Bible and Tract Depot at Palmerston North, with the purpose of publishing Christian literature to serve primarily the Brethren movement in New Zealand, but also the wider Christian community in both New Zealand and Australia. By 1911, it had become known as the Gospel Publishing House, but this name has since been depreciated. It operates bookshops and a publishing house, and, for many years, published the Treasury magazine. This magazine, founded in 1899 by Charles Hinman, long played a leading role in keeping the highly independent Brethren assemblies together as a network.

=== Pastorlink ===
Pastorlink was established by and for Brethren pastors. It expressly denies being either a union or an advocacy group; its stated aim is to give pastors a forum for mutual support and encouragement. Of all Brethren institutions, Pastorlink is one of the newest: it is only in the last twenty to thirty years that the practice of having pastors has become common in Brethren assemblies in New Zealand.

=== Pathways College ===
Pathways College is a Tauranga-based theological seminary formed in February 2000 by the merger of two older Brethren institutions: New Zealand Assembly Bible School and GLO Training Centre. Its current principal is Dr Francine Bennett.

=== GC3 ===
GC3 is an umbrella organisation encompassing three institutions: Global Connections in Mission (GCiM), which supports 150 missionaries abroad as well as almost 100 evangelists in New Zealand, GC Assist, an "operations trust" within GC3 which runs, among other projects, Headspace, a one-year program for school leavers, and GC Aid, a humanitarian NGO.

== Notable Brethren in New Zealand ==
N.B. This is a list of individuals who were part of the Open Brethren movement in New Zealand for at least a part of their lives.

- Enoch Coppin (1896-1975) — evangelist.
- J. Foster Crane (1913-1991) — missionary to Fiji.
- James George Deck (1807-1884) — evangelist and hymn writer. Although generally associated with the Exclusive Brethren, historian Peter Lineham regards him also as the founder of the Open Brethren in New Zealand.
- Gordon Forlong (1819-1908) — Scottish-born New Zealand evangelist.
- Colin Graham — evangelist.
- Joe Hawke — New Zealand MP (New Zealand Labour Party, 1996–2002)
- Ces Hilton — evangelist.
- Owen Jennings — New Zealand MP (ACT New Zealand Party, 1996–2002)
- Robert Laidlaw (1885-1971) — businessman and philanthropist.
- William H. Pettit (1885-1985) — medical doctor and missionary.
