= Ontario New Democratic Party candidates in the 2014 Ontario provincial election =

This is a list of candidates for the Ontario New Democratic Party in the 2014 Ontario general election.

== Central Ontario ==
Riding	Candidate's Name	Notes	Residence	Occupation	Votes	%	Rank
Barrie	David Bradbury				7,975	16.29	3rd
Dufferin—Caledon	Rehya Rebecca Yazbek				5,269	11.66	4th
Durham	Derek Spence				13,094	24.08	3rd
Haliburton—Kawartha Lakes—Brock	Don Abel	Member of Provincial Parliament for Wentworth North (1990–1995)			10,431	19.74	3rd
Newmarket—Aurora	Angus Duff				6,023	11.51	3rd
Northumberland—Quinte West	Kira Mees	ONDP candidate for Northumberland—Quinte West in the 2011 provincial election	Hastings County	Disability support worker	9,211	16.91	3rd
Peterborough	Sheila Wood				9,728	18.24	3rd
Simcoe—Grey	David Matthews	ONDP candidate for Simcoe—Grey in the 2011 provincial election			7,793	14.13	3rd
Simcoe North	Doris Middleton	ONDP candidate for Simcoe North in the 2011 provincial election			7,896	15.15	3rd
York—Simcoe	Laura Bowman				8,420	17.88	3rd

== Eastern Ontario/Ottawa ==
Riding	Candidate's Name	Notes	Residence	Occupation	Votes	%	Rank
Carleton—Mississippi Mills	John Hansen		Kanata	Small business owner	8,744	13.57	3rd
Glengarry—Prescott—Russell	Isabelle Sabourin			Executive assistant	5,902	12.46	3rd
Kingston and the Islands	Mary Rita Holland	ONDP candidate for Kingston and the Islands in the 2011 provincial election			14,811	29.56	2nd
Lanark—Frontenac—Lennox and Addington	Dave Parkhill	ONDP candidate for Lanark—Frontenac—Lennox and Addington in the 2011 provincial election	Kingston	Paramedic	10,184	20.18	3rd
Leeds—Grenville	David Lundy	ONDP candidate for Leeds—Grenville in the 2011 provincial election	Merrickville	Union leader (OPSEU)	7,219	17.41	3rd
Nepean—Carleton	Ric Dagenais	ONDP candidate for Nepean—Carleton in the 2011 provincial election		Union official (CUPE)	8,628	13.06	3rd
Ottawa Centre	Jennifer McKenzie	Ottawa-Carleton District School Board Trustee for Zone 10 (2006–2010)		Engineer	10,894	20.47	2nd
Ottawa—Orléans	Prosper M'Bemba-Meka			Toxicologist	5,022	8.98	3rd
Ottawa South	Bronwyn Funiciello	Ottawa Carleton District School Board Trustee for Zone 6 (2003–2014)	Ottawa	Civil servant	5,817	12.26	3rd
Ottawa—Vanier	Hervé Ngamby		Vanier	Engineer	5,228	13.32	3rd
Ottawa West—Nepean	Alex Cullen	Member of Ottawa City Council for Bay Ward (2000–2010); Member of Provincial Parliament for Ottawa West (1997–1999); Member of Ottawa City Council for Richmond Ward (1991–1994)		Economist	6,760	14.41	3rd
Prince Edward—Hastings	Merrill Stewart	ANDP candidate for Clover Bar-Fort Saskatchewan in the 2001 Alberta provincial election	Belleville	Sales professional	8,829	19.11	3rd
Renfrew—Nipissing—Pembroke	Brian Dougherty	ONDP candidate for Renfrew—Nipissing—Pembroke in the 2011 provincial election	Arnprior	Plumber	5,978	14.46	3rd
Stormont—Dundas—South Glengarry	Elaine MacDonald	Member of Cornwall City Council (2010–present)	Cornwall	Teacher	8,336	20.88	3rd

== Greater Toronto Area ==
Riding	Candidate's Name	Notes	Residence	Occupation	Votes	%	Rank
Ajax—Pickering	Jermaine King				8,274	16.09	3rd
Beaches—East York	Michael Prue	Member of Provincial Parliament for Beaches—East York (2001–2014); Candidate in the 2009 Ontario NDP leadership election Member of Toronto City Council for Ward 32 (Beaches—East York) (1998–2001); Mayor of East York (1993–1997)			16,737	38.93	2nd
Bramalea—Gore—Malton	Jagmeet Singh	Member of Provincial Parliament for Bramalea—Gore—Malton (2011–2017)		Lawyer	23,519	44.31	1st
Brampton—Springdale	Gurpreet Dhillon		Brampton	Business analyst	13,513	31.98	2nd
Brampton West	Gugni Gill Panaich				12,985	23.65	3rd
Burlington	Jan Mowbray	Member of Milton City Council (2003–2010)			7,792	14.38	3rd
Davenport	Jonah Schein	Member of Provincial Parliament for Davenport (2011–2014)		Social worker	14,322	40.15	2nd
Don Valley East	Akil Sadikali				4,500	14.03	3rd
Don Valley West	Khalid Ahmed	ONDP candidate for Don Valley West in the 2011 provincial election		Social worker	3,569	7.76	3rd
Eglinton—Lawrence	Thomas Gallezot				3,060	7.33	3rd
Etobicoke Centre	Chris Jones				5,758	12.14	3rd
Etobicoke—Lakeshore	P. C. Choo	ONDP candidate for Markham—Unionville in the 2011 provincial election			6,362	12.43	3rd
Etobicoke North	Nigel Barriffe				7,103	26.21	2nd
Halton	Nik Spohr	ONDP candidate for Halton in the 2011 provincial election			9,758	12.96	3rd
Markham—Unionville	Nadine Kormos Hawkins				4,205	10.03	3rd
Mississauga—Brampton South	Kevin Troake				6,906	16.72	3rd
Mississauga East—Cooksville	Fayaz Karim				6,158	15.39	3rd
Mississauga—Erindale	Michelle Bilek	ONDP candidate for Mississauga—Erindale in the 2011 provincial election			7,730	14.93	3rd
Mississauga South	Boris Rosolak				4,649	10.63	3rd
Mississauga—Streetsville	Anju Sikka	ONDP candidate for Mississauga South in the 2011 provincial election			5,885	13.70	3rd
Oak Ridges—Markham	Miles Krauter				9,355	11.58	3rd
Oakville	Che Marville				3,994	7.98	3rd
Oshawa	Jennifer French		Oshawa	Teacher	22,232	46.70	1st
Parkdale—High Park	Cheri DiNovo	Member of Provincial Parliament for Parkdale—High Park (2006–2017)	Toronto	United Church minister	18,385	40.77	1st
Pickering—Scarborough East	Eileen Higdon				6,600	14.78	3rd
Richmond Hill	Adam DeVita	ONDP candidate for Richmond Hill in the 2011 provincial election			4,697	10.97	3rd
Scarborough—Agincourt	Alex Wilson				4,105	11.81	3rd
Scarborough Centre	Carol Baker				7,145	20.29	3rd
Scarborough—Guildwood	Shuja Syed				5,894	16.98	3rd
Scarborough—Rouge River	Neethan Shan	York Region District School Board Trustee for Wards 7 and 8 (2006–2010)	Scarborough	Social worker	13,019	31.31	2nd
Scarborough Southwest	Jessie Macaulay				8,674	23.65	2nd
St. Paul's	Luke Savage				5,056	10.06	3rd
Toronto Centre	Kate Sellar			Lawyer	8,140	15.90	3rd
Toronto—Danforth	Peter Tabuns	Member of Provincial Parliament for Toronto—Danforth (2006–present); Member of Toronto City Council for Ward 8 (Riverdale) (1990–1997)	Toronto	Former executive director of Greenpeace Canada	19,190	44.61	1st
Thornhill	Cindy Hackelberg	ONDP candidate for Thornhill in the 2011 provincial election			4,052	8.14	3rd
Trinity—Spadina	Rosario Marchese	Member of Provincial Parliament for Trinity—Spadina (1999–2014); Member of Provincial Parliament for Fort York (1990–1999); Toronto District School Board Trustee for Ward 4 (1982–1990)	Toronto	Teacher	17,442	30.37	2nd
Vaughan	Marco Coletta				6,942	11.52	3rd
Whitby—Oshawa	Ryan Kelly			Teacher	13,621	23.04	3rd
Willowdale	Alexander Brown	ONDP candidate for Willowdale in the 2011 provincial election			4,693	10.15	3rd
York Centre	John Fragan	ONDP candidate for York Centre in the 2011 provincial election			5,645	15.96	3rd
York South—Weston	Paul Ferreira	Member of Provincial Parliament for Parkdale—High Park (2007)		Public relations professional	12,200	37.25	2nd
York West	Tom Rakocevic	ONDP candidate for York West in the 2011 provincial election		Executive assistant	9,997	39.21	2nd

== Hamilton/Niagara ==
Riding	Candidate's Name	Notes	Residence	Occupation	Votes	%	Rank
Ancaster—Dundas—Flamborough—Westdale	Alex Johnstone				8,415	15.60	3rd
Hamilton Centre	Andrea Horwath	Leader of the Ontario New Democratic Party (2009–2022); Member of Provincial Parliament for Hamilton Centre (2007–2022); Member of Provincial Parliament for Hamilton East (2004–2007); Member of Hamilton City Council for Ward 2 (1997–2004)	Hamilton, Ontario		18,697	52.01	1st
Hamilton East—Stoney Creek	Paul Miller	Member of Provincial Parliament for Hamilton East—Stoney Creek (2007–2022); Member of Stoney Creek City Council (1994–2000)	Stoney Creek		19,958	48.61	1st
Hamilton Mountain	Monique Taylor	Member of Provincial Parliament for Hamilton Mountain (2011–2025)	Hamilton		23,066	46.90	1st
Niagara Falls	Wayne Gates	Member of Provincial Parliament for Hamilton Mountain (2014–present); Member of Niagara Falls City Council (2010–2014)	Niagara Falls	Union leader (Unifor)	24,131	47.39	1st
Niagara West—Glanbrook	Brian McCormack				12,423	22.22	3rd
St. Catharines	Jennie Stevens	Member of St. Catharines City Council (2003–2018)	St. Catharines		11,350	24.40	3rd
Welland	Cindy Forster	Member of Provincial Parliament for Welland (2011–2018); Mayor of Welland (2000–2003)	Welland	Nurse	21,326	46.71	1st

== Northern Ontario ==
Riding	Candidate's Name	Notes	Residence	Occupation	Votes	%	Rank
Algoma—Manitoulin	Michael Mantha	Member of Provincial Parliament for Algoma—Manitoulin (2011–2025)	Elliot Lake	Executive assistant	14,171	53.41	1st
Kenora—Rainy River	Sarah Campbell	Member of Provincial Parliament for Kenora—Rainy River (2011–2018)	Vermilion Bay	Executive assistant	12,889	55.66	1st
Nipissing	Henri Giroux	ONDP candidate for Nipissing in the 2011, and 2007 provincial elections		Chef	8,057	25.74	3rd
Parry Sound—Muskoka	Clyde Mobbley				4,999	12.92	4th
Sault Ste. Marie	Celia Ross	President of Algoma University (1998–2010)	Sault Ste. Marie	University professor	7,610	25.47	2nd
Sudbury	Joe Cimino	Member of Greater Sudbury City Council for Ward 1 (2006–2014)	Sudbury	Teacher	14,274	42.24	1st
Thunder Bay—Atikokan	Mary Kozorys	ONDP candidate for Thunder Bay—Atikokan in the 2011 provincial election			8,052	28.11	2nd
Thunder Bay—Superior North	Andrew Foulds	Member of Thunder Bay City Council for Current River Ward (2006–present)			8,169	29.46	2nd
Timiskaming—Cochrane	John Vanthof	Member of Provincial Parliament for Timiskaming—Cochrane (2011–present)	Earlton	Farmer	14,661	55.48	1st
Timmins—James Bay	Gilles Bisson	Member of Provincial Parliament for Timmins—James Bay (1999–2018); Member of Provincial Parliament for Cochrane South (1990–1999)	Timmins	Union leader	11,756	51.18	1st

== Southwestern Ontario ==
Riding	Candidate's Name	Notes	Residence	Occupation	Votes	%	Rank
Brant	Alex Felsky				13,992	27.15	3rd
Bruce—Grey—Owen Sound	Karen Gventer	ONDP candidate for Dufferin—Caledon in the 2011 provincial election			6,787	15.85	3rd
Cambridge	Bobbi Stewart				10,413	21.60	3rd
Chatham-Kent—Essex	Dan Gelinas				11,664	31.14	2nd
Elgin—Middlesex—London	Kathy Cornish	ONDP candidate for Elgin—Middlesex—London in the 2011 provincial election			12,034	26.63	2nd
Essex	Taras Natyshak	Member of Provincial Parliament for Essex (2011–2022)	Belle River	Union official	28,118	60.34	1st
Guelph	James Gordon	ONDP candidate for Guelph in the 2011 provincial election	Guelph	Musician	9,385	17.70	4th
Haldimand—Norfolk	Ian Nichols	ONDP candidate for Haldimand—Norfolk in the 2011 provincial election			9,786	23.16	2nd
Huron—Bruce	Jan Johnstone				10,843	22.85	3rd
Kitchener Centre	Margaret Johnston				9,765	22.81	3rd
Kitchener—Conestoga	James Villeneuve				9,958	21.24	3rd
Kitchener—Waterloo	Catherine Fife	Member of Provincial Parliament for Waterloo (2012–present)	Waterloo	Researcher	20,536	37.43	1st
Lambton—Kent—Middlesex	Joe Hill	ONDP candidate for Lambton—Kent—Middlesex in the 2011 provincial election			12,160	26.52	2nd
London—Fanshawe	Teresa Armstrong	Member of Provincial Parliament for London—Fanshawe (2011–present)	London	Insurance professional	17,903	50.42	1st
London North Centre	Judy Bryant				13,853	29.84	2nd
London West	Peggy Sattler	Member of Provincial Parliament for London West (2013–present)	London	Policy analyst	22,243	40.36	1st
Oxford	Bryan Smith				10,573	25.79	2nd
Perth—Wellington	Romayne Smith Fullerton				7,764	18.91	3rd
Sarnia—Lambton	Brian White	ONDP candidate for Sarnia—Lambton in the 2011 provincial election			16,327	35.76	2nd
Wellington—Halton Hills	Michael Carlucci				6,804	14.13	3rd
Windsor—Tecumseh	Percy Hatfield	Member of Provincial Parliament for Windsor—Tecumseh (2013–2022)	Windsor	Journalist	22,818	62.16	1st
Windsor West	Lisa Gretzky		Windsor	Event planner	15,043	41.40	1st
