= The Tabernacle, Notting Hill =

Church in Notting Hill, London, England

Coordinates: 51°31′00″N 0°12′06″W

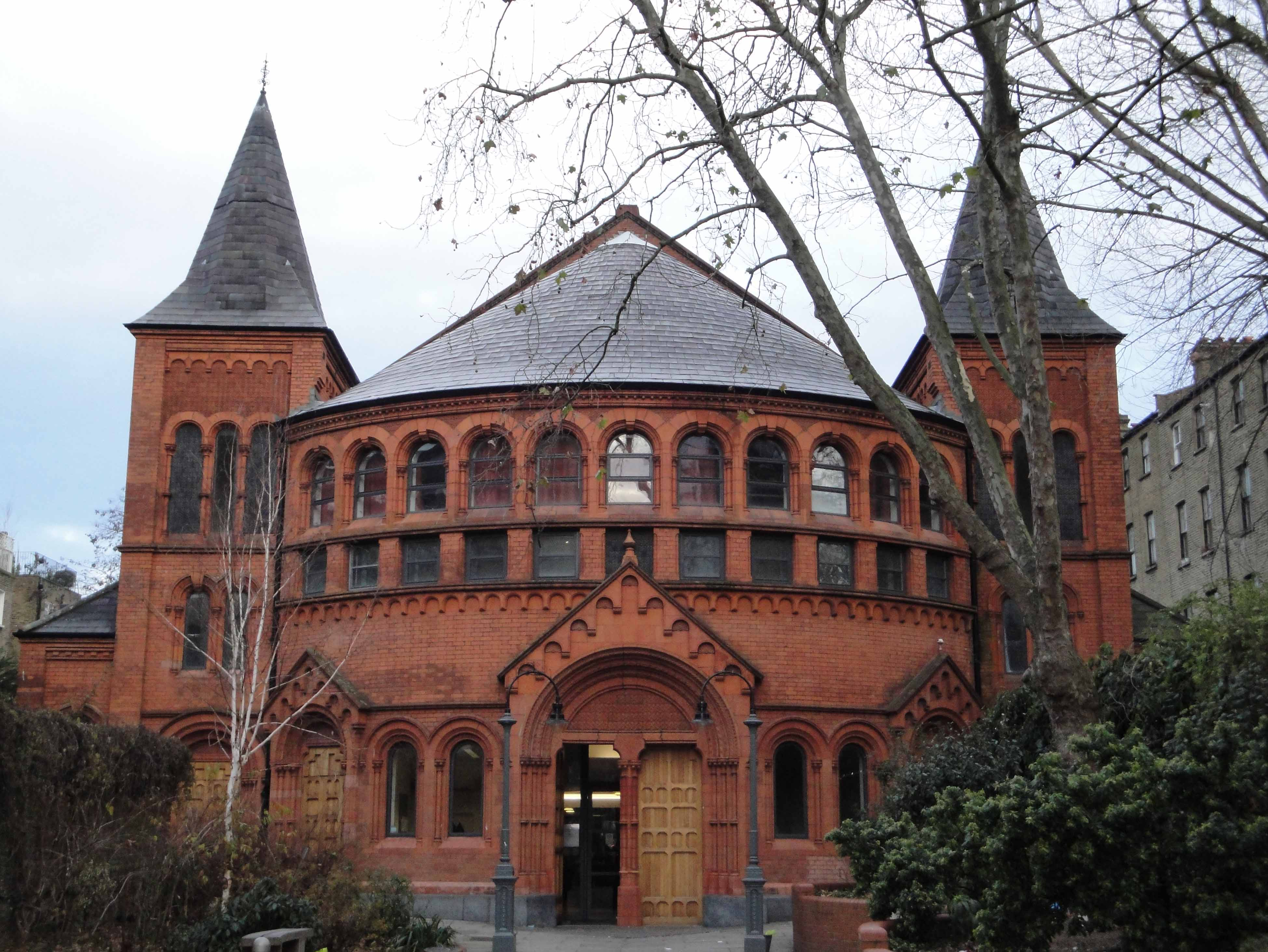
The Tabernacle, Notting Hill, January 2010

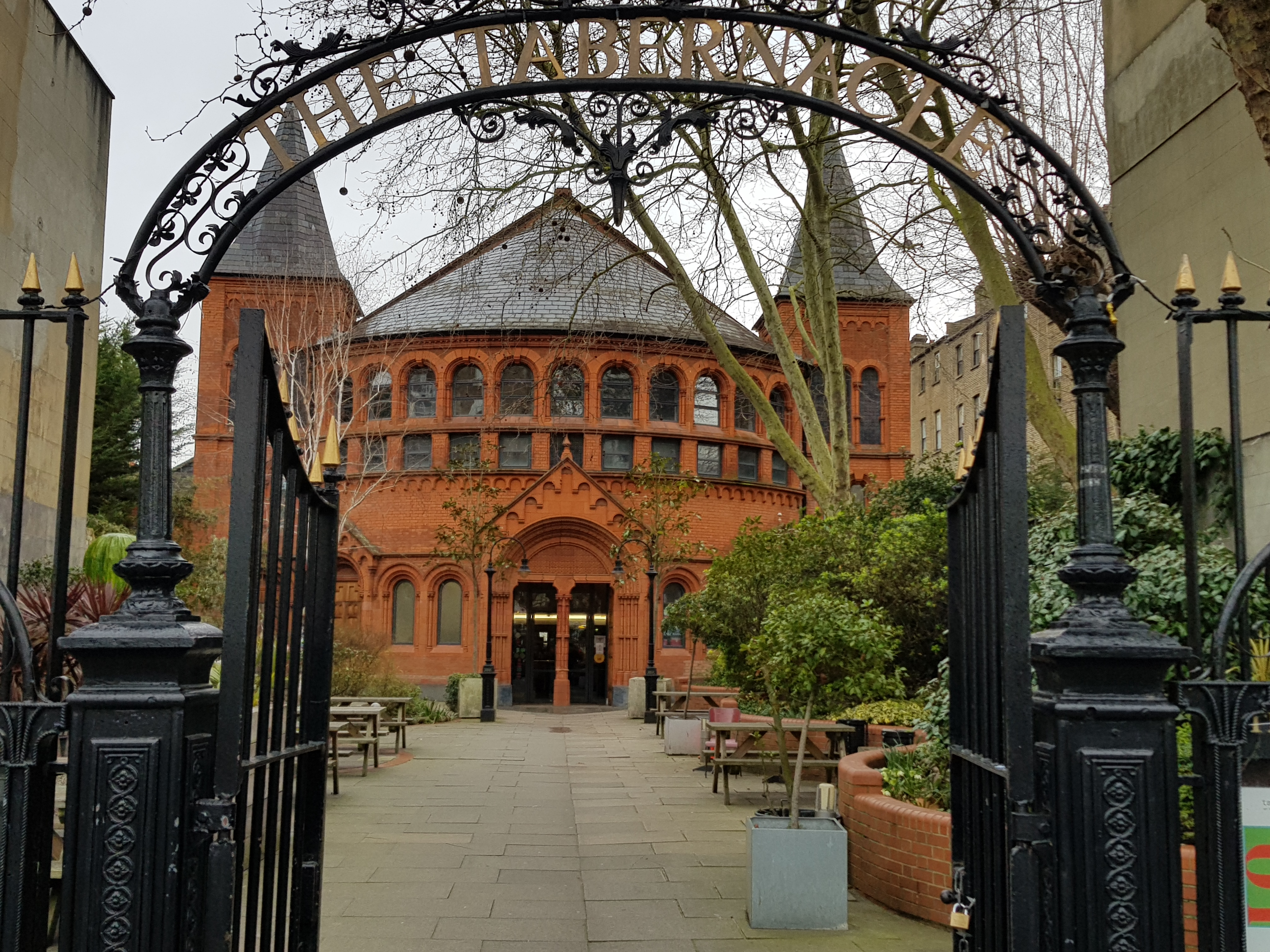
The Tabernacle, February 2020

The Tabernacle is a Grade II-listed building in Powis Square, Notting Hill, west London, England, built in 1887 as a church. The building boasts a curved Romanesque façade of red brick and terracotta, and two towers with broach spires on either side. Today the Tabernacle serves as a cultural arts and entertainment venue, including a theatre, meeting rooms, music studio, art gallery, bar and kitchen, conservatory and a garden courtyard.

== History ==
Originally known as The Talbot Tabernacle (in the 1850s the freehold of nearby Portobello Farm was still owned by the Talbot family), the Tabernacle was founded as an evangelical Christian church in 1869 by the former barrister Gordon Forlong 1819–1908, in order to serve as a "non-sectarian Church of Christ". Forlong had been a preacher at the Victoria Hall in Archer Street, and was soon able to raise the capital to build a temporary iron church, with a capacity of around 1,000 people. The iron church was larger than most similar buildings in Kensington, and had an end gallery.(ref. 146)

The present building was constructed in 1887 during the ministry of Frank Henry White, and was designed by architects Habershon and Fawckner.

In the 1970s The Tabernacle became a community arts centre, leased on a peppercorn rent from Kensington and Chelsea Council by a management committee made up of local enthusiasts. The committee hired the Tabernacle's only complete (small) hall to local community groups to raise funds for further development of the building and to run basic services, for example employing a youth worker to coordinate programmes for the children of local residents in what was at the time an extremely disadvantaged neighbourhood. The rival Carnival Arts Committee and Carnival Development Committee both made use of the venue each year in the weeks leading up to the Notting Hill Carnival featuring bands such as the Mangrove steel band.

Despite the injection of considerable energy and goodwill by a wide range of local groups, the Tabernacle had a somewhat hand-to-mouth existence, and in the late 1970s the main hall was still undeveloped, stripped of its seating and not in daily use.

During the 1990s The Rolling Stones and Pink Floyd rehearsed at the Tabernacle. In 1998, the Tabernacle reopened after a £4 million refurbishment, featuring a new hall, studios, art gallery and bar/restaurant.

In 2016, the British Palestinian artist Reem Kelani released a double album of songs entitled Live at the Tabernacle and based on a live recording of a concert she gave in 2012 as part of Kensington and Chelsea London Borough Council Nour Festival of Arabic Arts

== The Tabernacle today ==
The Tabernacle is no longer a place of worship, but continues to serve the secular needs of the local community. The Carnival Village Trust and Tabernacle W11 runs The Tabernacle on behalf of the Royal Borough of Kensington and Chelsea.
