= John Northcote Deck =

Medical doctor and missionary (1875–1957)

- Liutasi
- Born: 12 March 1875; London, England
- Died: 10 May 1957 (aged 82); Toronto, Canada
- Education: MB, ChM
- Occupation(s): doctor, missionary
- Organization: South Sea Evangelical Mission
- Spouse: (1) Jessie Gibson (2) Gladys Deck
- Parent(s): John Feild Deck and Emily Baring Young
- Relatives: Florence Young (aunt), James George Deck (grandfather), Norman C. Deck (brother)
- Awards: Fellow, Royal Geographical Society

John Northcote Deck (1875–1957) (known as Northcote) was a medical doctor, a missionary in the Solomon Islands, and an author of religious texts.

== Early life ==
Deck was born in London, England on 12 March 1875 to Dr John Feild Deck and Emily (née Young, elder sister of missionary Florence Young). Deck's grandfather was evangelist James George Deck, who had emigrated from England to New Zealand with his family, including his son John Feild Deck, in 1853. John Feild Deck and Emily Baring Young married in New Zealand in 1865, but Northcote Deck was born during a visit back to England. Four of John and Emily's sons became doctors, and seven of their eleven children became missionaries: five with the South Sea Evangelical Mission (SSEM) and two with other missions.

In 1877, John Feild Deck moved from New Zealand to Australia with his family. Northcote Deck studied medicine at Sydney University, gaining a Bachelor of Medicine in 1900 and a Master of Surgery in 1902. He worked at Prince Alfred Hospital, then in 1903 joined his father at Deck Sr.'s newly established Sydney Homeopathic Hospital.

== Missionary work ==
Deck's aunt Florence Young was the founder of the Queensland Kanaka Mission and the South Sea Evangelical Mission. Young set up her Kanaka mission in 1882 to work with people from the Solomon Islands and New Hebrides who had been brought to Queensland, Australia to work on sugar plantations. Over 2000 Pacific Islanders were baptised in Queensland during the next 25 years. In 1904 a branch of Young's mission was set up in the Solomons because the Australian government was about to deport the workers back to their homelands.

Deck first visited the Solomon Islands in 1908 as part of the SSEM. After his trip to Malaita Deck returned to Sydney and then travelled to New Zealand to attend missionary meetings and give lectures. He returned to the Solomons in 1909 and was based at Onepusu on Malaita, where he was head of the SSEM during his aunt's absences. Deck was the SSEM's first medical missionary. He travelled around the Solomon Islands in the SSEM's ship Evangel, visiting schools to assist and encourage the local teachers, and became known as 'Liutasi' ("the man who goes everywhere").

Deck explored Rennell Island, a remote and rarely-visited island to the southwest of the Solomon archipelago, on four trips in 1909. The people there had no metal tools. In 1910 Deck set up a mission outpost at Rennell Island, but on his return to the island a few months after dropping off the native teachers he found that they had been murdered only days after arriving by the local people who apparently wanted the metal nails used to construct the mission house. Following this event, the government closed access to Rennell Island. A mission station was eventually established in 1934. In 1945, Deck published a book about Rennell Island, South from Guadalcanal: The Romance of Rennell Island.

In 1909, Deck was the first white man to cross the island of Malaita. He started from the mission station at Kwai on the east coast and walked across the island through a mountain pass and dense bush to Bina on the west coast, and then to the mission post at Auki. This was very dangerous as the bushmen of Malaita were not Christian and in some cases still practiced cannibalism.

In 1910, Deck became the first white man to cross Guadalcanal, a four-day journey along native tracks through dense mountainous jungle. In 1911 he retrieved the skulls and bones of some Austrians who had been killed on Guadalcanal in 1896 after climbing Tatuve, a sacred mountain. Deck was awarded Fellowship of the Royal Geographical Society after his excursions to the dangerous interiors of Malaita and Guadalcanal islands.

Deck wrote quarterly letters describing his activities. These were widely read, with 2000 copies of each being printed during the 1920s. Deck was a powerful public speaker and was said to have a warm and generous personality.

Deck left the Solomon Islands in 1928 due to ill health. He lived in England for ten years, teaching and speaking about religious matters, before settling in Canada.

== Personal life ==
Deck married Jessica Gibson in 1911 in Dunedin, New Zealand. She died at Onepusu in March 1921 of blackwater fever. In 1923 Deck married his cousin Gladys Deck from Motueka, New Zealand. He had two children with Gladys.

Deck died in Toronto, Canada, on 10 May 1957.
