= SSEM =

SSEM can refer to:

- Manchester Baby or Small-Scale Experimental Machine, historic computer
- South Seas Evangelical Mission, missionary organization in the Solomon Islands
- Serial-section electron microscopy (ssEM), a form of transmission electron microscopy
