= Peter Ambuofa =

Malaita Christion convert and missionary

Peter Ambuofa (also spelled Peter Abu'ofa) was an early convert to Christianity among Solomon Islanders who established a Christian community on Malaita. He is considered the founder of the South Seas Evangelical Mission (now South Seas Evangelical Church, SSEC) in Malaita.

== Biography ==
Peter Ambuofa was from north Malaita and worked in Queensland, Australia as a kanaka labourer. He converted to Christianity and was baptised at Bundaberg, Queensland in 1892.

When he returned to the Solomon Islands in 1894, he established a Christian community at Malu'u. At first he was shunned by his relatives, who thought he had brought a strange devil (akalo) with him. He was left to die of hunger, not allowed to move freely; but an old woman, taking pity on him, offered him roast taro on market days, and he was also able to take fruit from a wawao tree nearby and take water from a well he dug nearby. A traditional story also counts that he had a hen which laid an egg for him whenever he prayed.

In another story, some relatives of his tried to shoot him while he was praying, but as they attempted to shoot a thick smoke came up and ruined their aim. Later, when the smoke cleared, they tried again, but the triggers did not work. They went off to shoot a fruit, and the guns worked fine, so they came to believe that Ambuofa's spirit was more powerful than their own, and accepted Christianity as a result.

Peter Ambuofa was uneducated and had some confusions regarding Christian teaching, so he solicited help from the Queensland Kanaka Mission to help teach his flock. In response, in 1904, Florence Young led the first party of missionaries to the Solomon Islands in 1904. Eventually this led to the creation of the South Seas Evangelical Mission.

In March 1994, a special celebratory service was held at Bundaberg in honor of the centennial of Ambuofa's return to the Solomon Islands, which 1,300 members of the SSEC attended.
