= Tasman District =

Government district of New Zealand

Tasman District Te Tai o Aorere
- Territorial authority district and region
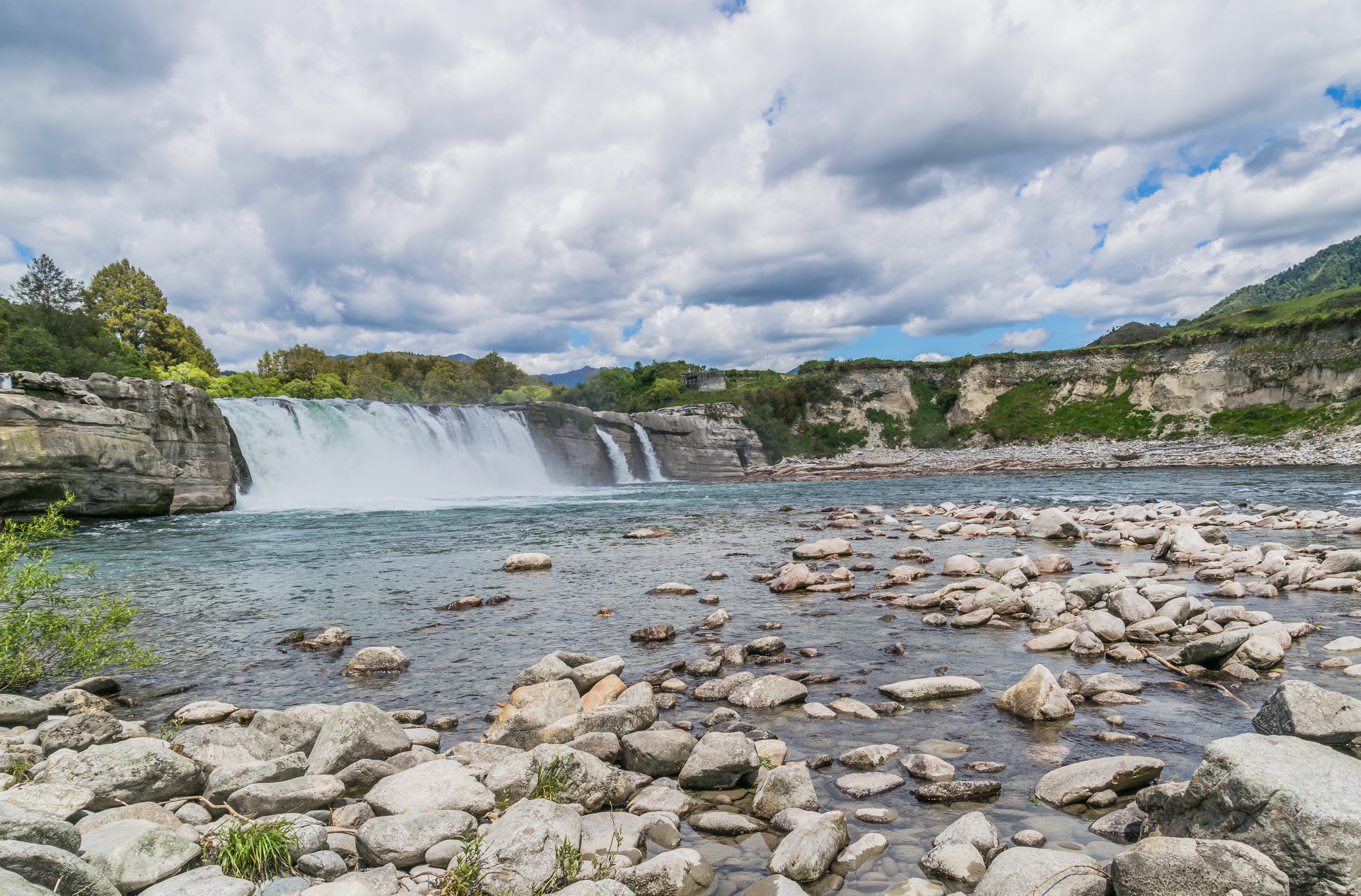
- Maruia Falls

- Tasman within New Zealand
- Coordinates: 41°30′S 172°48′E
- Country: New Zealand
- District: Tasman District
- Wards: Golden Bay; Motueka; Moutere-Waimea; Richmond; Lakes-Murchison
- Community boards: Golden Bay; Motueka
- Formed: 1 November 1989
- Seat: Richmond

Government
  - Body: Tasman District Council
  - Mayor: Tim King
  - Deputy Mayor: Brent Maru

Area
  - Total: 9,615.58 km^{2} (3,712.60 sq mi)

Population (June 2025)
  - Total: 59,900
  - Density: 6.23/km^{2} (16.1/sq mi)
- Time zone: UTC+12 (NZST)
  - Summer (DST): UTC+13 (NZDT)
- Postcode(s): Map of postcodes
- ISO 3166 code: NZ-TAS
- HDI (2023): 0.931 very high · 7th
- Website: www.tasman.govt.nz

Tasman District (Māori: Te Tai o Aorere) is a local government district in the northwest of the South Island of New Zealand. It borders the Canterbury Region, West Coast Region, Marlborough District and Nelson City. It is administered by the Tasman District Council, a unitary authority, which sits at Richmond, with community boards serving outlying communities in Motueka and Golden Bay / Mohua. The city of Nelson has its own unitary authority separate from Tasman District, and together they comprise a single region in some contexts, but not for local government functions or resource management (planning) functions. Amalgamation of the two districts has been discussed at times.

As part of the 1989 New Zealand local government reforms, the Tasman District was formed in two steps: first in April 1989 from a merger of Richmond Borough, Motueka Borough, and Waimea County, with Golden Bay County added in November 1989. Initially a district council, it became a unitary authority in 1992.

== History ==
=== Pre-1989 ===
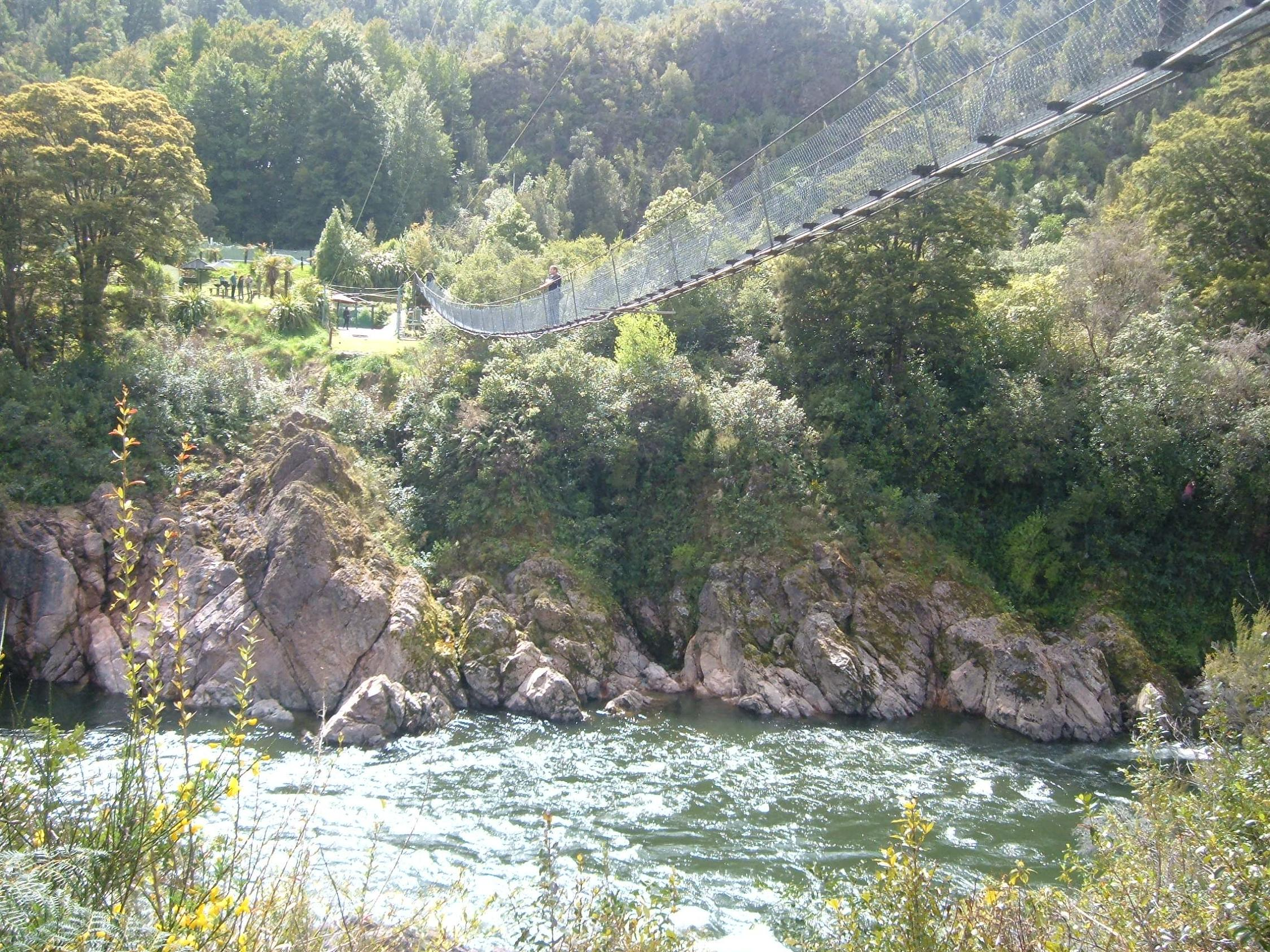
Swingbridge across the Buller River

According to tradition, the Māori canoe (waka) Uruao brought ancestors of the Waitaha people to Tasman Bay in the 12th century. Archaeological evidence suggests that early Māori settlers explored the region thoroughly, settling mainly along the coast where there was ample food.

The succession of tribes into the area suggests considerable warfare interrupted the settlement process. Around 1828, Ngāti Toa (under Te Rauparaha) and the allied northern tribes of Ngāti Rārua and Ngāti Tama started their invasion of the South Island. They took over much of the area from Farewell Spit to the Wairau River.

British immigrant ships from England arrived in Nelson in 1842 and European settlement of the region began under the leadership of Captain Arthur Wakefield. From 1853 to 1876, the area of the present-day Tasman District formed part of Nelson Province.

In the 1850s, agriculture and pastoral farming started and villages developed on the Waimea Plains and at Motueka. In 1856, the discovery of gold near Collingwood sparked New Zealand's first gold rush. Significant reserves of iron ore were found at Onekaka, and the Onekaka Ironworks operated during the 1920s and 1930s.

Fruit-growing started at the end of the 19th century. By 1945, it was making a significant contribution to the local economy, and that importance continues today.

=== Since 1989 ===
Tasman District was initially formed on 1 April 1989, replacing Richmond Borough, Motueka Borough, and Waimea County. The area was reconstituted through an Order in Council dated 13 June 1989, with Golden Bay County joining Tasman District on 1 November 1989. Tasman District was initially a district council within the Nelson-Marlborough Region. Tasman District became a unitary authority on 1 July 1992.

Nelson City initiated a proposal for Nelson and Tasman to be amalgamated. The Local Government Commission approved the proposal and it was put as referendums to voters in the respective areas. The proposal had to have received majority support in both areas to go ahead, and 57% of Nelson voters supported it, but 74% of Tasman voters rejected it. In May 2026, the New Zealand government announced local government restructuring and the possible Nelson-Tasman merger resurfaced. Nelson mayor Nick Smith favoured amalgamation, whilst Tasman mayor Tim King favoured closer collaboration without supporting amalgamation.

== Geography ==
Tasman District is a large area at the western corner of the north end of the South Island of New Zealand. It covers 9,616 km^{2} (3,713 sq mi) and is bounded on the west by the Matiri Ranges, Tasman Mountains and the Tasman Sea.

To the north, Tasman and Golden Bays form its seaward edge, and the eastern boundary extends to the edge of Nelson city, and includes part of the Spenser Mountains and the Saint Arnaud and Richmond Ranges. The Victoria Ranges form Tasman's southern boundary and the district's highest point is Mount Franklin, at 2,340 m (7,680 ft).

The landscape is diverse, from large mountainous areas to valleys and plains, and is sliced by such major rivers as the Buller, Motueka, Aorere, Tākaka and Wairoa. The limestone-rich area around Mount Owen and Mount Arthur is notable for its extensive cave networks, among them New Zealand's deepest caves at Ellis Basin and Nettlebed. There is abundant bush and bird life, golden sand beaches, the unique 40-kilometre sands of Farewell Spit, and good fishing in the bays and rivers. These assets make the district a popular destination for tourists.

Tasman is home to three national parks: Abel Tasman National Park (New Zealand's smallest at 225.41 km^{2}), Nelson Lakes National Park (1,017.53 km^{2}) and Kahurangi National Park (4,520 km^{2}).

The Maruia Falls, 8 kilometres (5.0 mi) southwest of Murchison, were created by the 1929 Murchison earthquake when a slip blocked the original channel.

== Demography ==
Tasman District covers 9,615.58 km^{2} (3,712.60 sq mi) and had an estimated population of 59,900 as of June 2025,, representing 1.1% of New Zealand's population. The population density was 6.2 people per km^{2}.

Historical population
Year	Pop.	±% p.a.
1991	34,026	—
1996	37,974	+2.22%
2001	41,352	+1.72%
2006	44,625	+1.54%
2013	47,157	+0.79%
2018	52,389	+2.13%
2023	57,807	+1.99%

Tasman District had a population of 57,807 in the 2023 New Zealand census, an increase of 5,418 people (10.3%) since the 2018 census, and an increase of 10,650 people (22.6%) since the 2013 census. There were 28,722 males, 28,887 females and 201 people of other genders in 22,617 dwellings. 2.5% of people identified as LGBTIQ+. The median age was 46.8 years (compared with 38.1 years nationally). There were 9,498 people (16.4%) aged under 15 years, 8,523 (14.7%) aged 15 to 29, 26,322 (45.5%) aged 30 to 64, and 13,467 (23.3%) aged 65 or older.

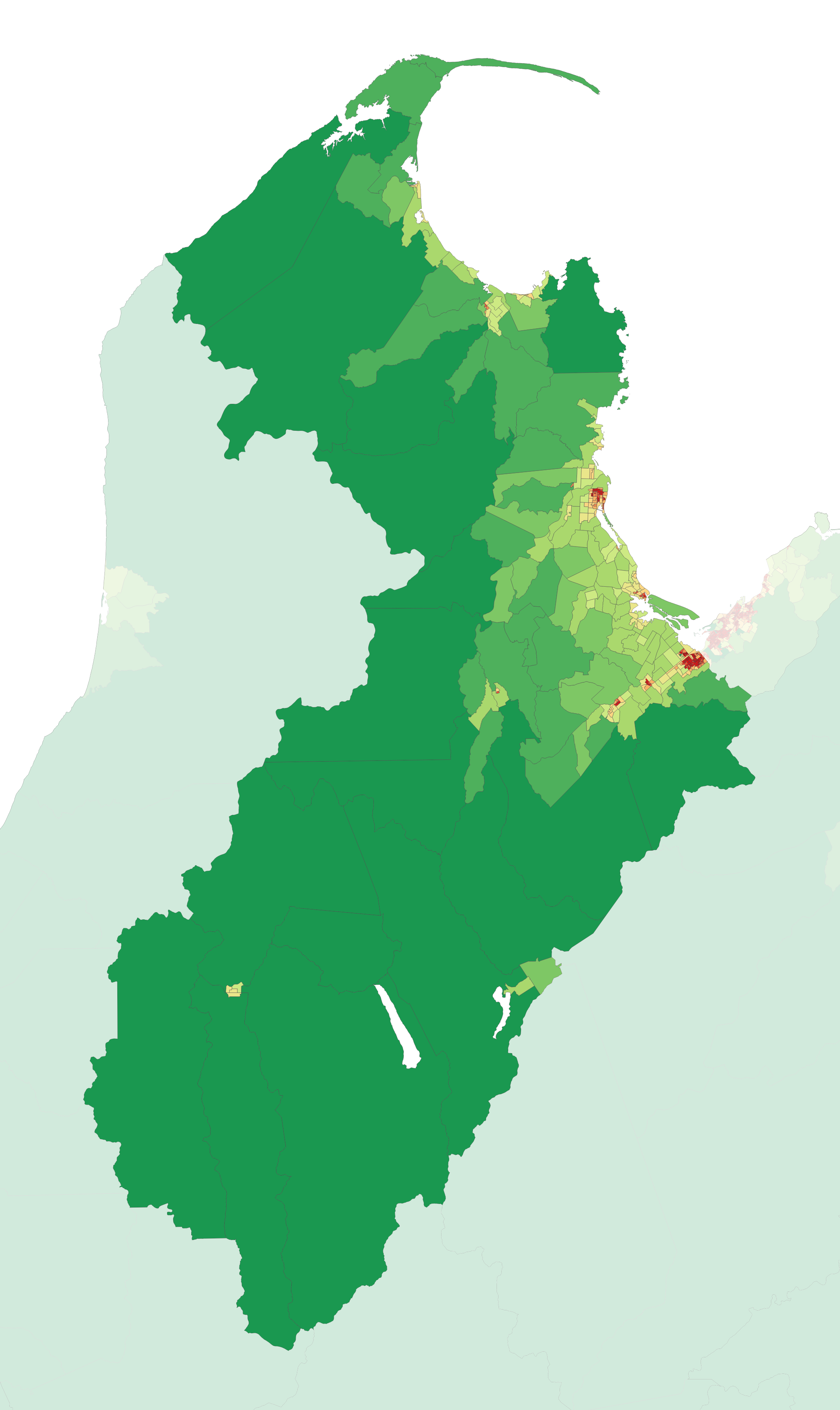
Population density in the 2023 census

People could identify as more than one ethnicity. The results were 90.7% European (Pākehā); 9.9% Māori; 2.6% Pasifika; 4.0% Asian; 0.8% Middle Eastern, Latin American and African New Zealanders (MELAA); and 3.2% other, which includes people giving their ethnicity as "New Zealander". English was spoken by 97.8%, Māori language by 2.0%, Samoan by 0.5% and other languages by 9.2%. No language could be spoken by 1.5% (e.g. too young to talk). New Zealand Sign Language was known by 0.5%. The percentage of people born overseas was 21.2, compared with 28.8% nationally.

Religious affiliations were 27.0% Christian, 0.4% Hindu, 0.2% Islam, 0.3% Māori religious beliefs, 1.0% Buddhist, 0.7% New Age, 0.1% Jewish, and 1.1% other religions. People who answered that they had no religion were 61.4%, and 8.1% of people did not answer the census question.

Of those at least 15 years old, 7,281 (15.1%) people had a bachelor's or higher degree, 26,712 (55.3%) had a post-high school certificate or diploma, and 11,781 (24.4%) people exclusively held high school qualifications. The median income was $35,900, compared with $41,500 nationally. 4,137 people (8.6%) earned over $100,000 compared to 12.1% nationally. The employment status of those at least 15 was that 22,566 (46.7%) people were employed full-time, 7,983 (16.5%) were part-time, and 870 (1.8%) were unemployed.

The main iwi represented in the wider Tasman region are Ngāti Rārua, Ngāti Tama (Golden Bay / Mohua and Tasman Bay), Te Ātiawa, Ngāti Koata, Ngāti Kuia (eastern Tasman Bay) and the Poutini Ngāi Tahu (southern areas).

In Tasman District, German is the second most-spoken language after English, whereas in most regions of New Zealand Māori is the second most-spoken language.

Famous former residents include the "father of nuclear physics" Sir Ernest Rutherford, former Prime Ministers Bill Rowling and Sir Keith Holyoake, and Sir Michael Myers, Chief Justice of New Zealand 1929–1946.

=== Urban areas and settlements ===
The Tasman District has six towns with a population over 1,000. Together, they are home to 60.8% of the district's population.

Urban area	Population (June 2025)	% of region
Richmond	19,950	33.3%
Motueka	8,290	13.8%
Wakefield	2,730	4.6%
Brightwater	2,330	3.9%
Tākaka	1,440	2.4%
Māpua	1,680	2.8%

Other towns and settlements include the following:

==== Golden Bay Ward ====
- Collingwood
- Pohara/Ligar Bay/Tata Beach/Tarakohe/Wainui
- Tākaka

==== Lakes-Murchison Ward ====
- Murchison
- Saint Arnaud
- Tapawera

==== Motueka Ward ====
- Kaiteretere
- Mārahau
- Motueka
- Riwaka

==== Moutere-Waimea Ward ====
- Brightwater
- Māpua–Ruby Bay
- Tasman
- Upper Moutere
- Wakefield

==== Richmond Ward ====
- Richmond

Individual wards
Name	Area (km^{2})	Population	Density (per km^{2})	Dwellings	Median age	Median income
Golden Bay Ward	2,587.54	5,748	2.22	2,580	50.2 years	$29,100
Lakes-Murchison Ward	5,577.11	4,107	0.74	1,650	46.3 years	$34,400
Moutere-Waimea Ward	965.40	15,321	15.87	5,679	47.4 years	$39,600
Motueka Ward	381.99	13,329	34.89	5,187	47.0 years	$32,400
Richmond Ward	103.53	19,302	186.44	7,518	45.0 years	$39,300
New Zealand					38.1 years	$41,500

== Government ==
Tasman District Council (unitary authority) headquarters are at Richmond, close to the adjoining Nelson City, which is 10 kilometres (6.2 mi) further north. The head of local government is the mayor. Community Boards exist to serve outlying areas in Motueka and Golden Bay.

== Economy ==
The GDP of the Tasman District was NZ$3.11 billion in 2033, representing 0.8% of New Zealand's national GDP. Over the 10 years to 2023, economic growth in the district was an average of 4.4% p.a., compared with 3.0% p.a. for all of New Zealand.
