= Christian Community Churches of Australia =

- Classification: Protestant
- Orientation: Plymouth Brethren
- Polity: Congregationalist
- Region: Australia
- Origin: 1850s as Open Brethren/Christian Brethren, incorporated as CCCAust in 2007.
- Congregations: 320
- Members: 46,176 (including children)

The Christian Community Churches of Australia are a network of Open Brethren churches, or "assemblies", in Australia. They do not form a denomination in the organizational sense, but rather a network of like-minded autonomous local churches.

== Brethren history in Australia ==
Brethren assemblies have existed in Australia since the 1850s. Holding congregational autonomy as a core principle, they long resisted forming any kind of central organization, preferring to operate as a network bound together by relationships rather than organized bodies. A number of organizations aiming to support the Brethren movement did arise, however, and gained widespread acceptance among the assemblies. These included the Stewards Foundation (established 16 July 1965). A national committee was established in 2006, which was subsequently incorporated as the Christian Community Churches of Australia. Not all Brethren assemblies affiliated to it immediately; the Western Australian Brethren did not join it until 2013.

The Open Brethren in Australia have been embarrassed by negative publicity surrounding the Plymouth Brethren Christian Church, a hardline branch of the Exclusive Brethren (and the only Exclusive group to exist in significant numbers in Australia), which some defectors have accused of being a cult. The Open Brethren decision to rebrand itself as the Christian Community Churches of Australia is seen by some as partly a reaction to public confusion between their own movement and the Exclusives.

According to the Evangelical publication, Operation World, there were 320 Brethren congregations in Australia with 46,176 affiliates in 2010.

== Brethren diversity ==
The Brethren in Australia have diversified greatly in the last generation. They form a continuum ranging from conservative "Gospel Halls" and "Gospel Chapels" at one end, through "Bible Chapels", "Community Churches", and other designations that include the term "church" at the progressive end. (The terms conservative and progressive are often informally used in Brethren circles to categorize assemblies and individuals according to the emphasis, or lack of emphasis, they place on teachings and practices that have historically distinguished the Brethren from other Evangelical Christians. These distinctives included rejection of salaried pastors, "open worship" in which male members of the congregation who felt "led by the Holy Spirit" would propose hymns, read scriptures, and offer prayers, male-only leadership, a cappella singing, Dispensationalist theology, complete rejection of the Charismatic movement, and varying degrees of insularity from non-Brethren Christians). Some of the more conservative assemblies still emphasize these distinctives, while many at the more "progressive" end of the spectrum now have salaried pastors, accompanied music in worship, a less dispensational way of understanding eschatology, and may allow for female participation in worship, and in some cases, in leadership. Many of the progressive assemblies are very willing to collaborate with non-Brethren Christians in evangelism and in interdenominational missions, and some are receptive to the Charismatic movement, although this is less common in Australia than among the New Zealand Brethren.

== Brethren institutions ==
As a network rather than an organization, the Brethren movement does not own or operate any institutions. There are, however, a number of institutions, including trusts, seminaries, and missions agencies which, although independent, are owned and operated by Brethren individuals and financially supported by Brethren assemblies. The Christian Community Churches of Australia itself is a service organization, not a governing body, which exists to facilitate coordination and cooperation among Brethren assemblies throughout Australia.

The Stewards Foundation, already mentioned, offers financial assistance to churches and related organizations affiliated with the Christian Community Churches of Australia, along with insurance and trusteeship services, and assists with humanitarian disaster relief within Australia. Other institutions that have widespread support among the Brethren include the Christian Brethren Trust (operating as a trustee for many assemblies in Victoria), three seminaries (Emmaus Bible College in Epping, New South Wales, Gospel Literature Outreach in Riverstone, New South Wales, and Mueller College of Missions in Redcliffe, Queensland), and four magazines (Serving Together (AMT), Assemblies Outreach, Spearhead, and CBFM).
