= Moutere-Waimea Ward =

- Ward
- Interactive map of Moutere-Waimea Ward
- Coordinates: 41.25°S 172.98°E
- Country: New Zealand
- District: Tasman District
- Time zone: UTC+12 (NZST)
  - Summer (DST): UTC+13 (NZDT)

Moutere-Waimea Ward is a ward of Tasman District in the north of the South Island of New Zealand.
