= Golden Bay Ward =

Coordinates: 40°40′38″S 172°40′58″E

- Ward
- Interactive map of Golden Bay Ward
- Country: New Zealand
- District: Golden Bay Ward
- Time zone: UTC+12 (NZST)
  - Summer (DST): UTC+13 (NZDT)

Golden Bay Ward is a ward of Tasman District in the north of the South Island of New Zealand.
