= Motueka =

Town in Tasman District, New Zealand

- Town
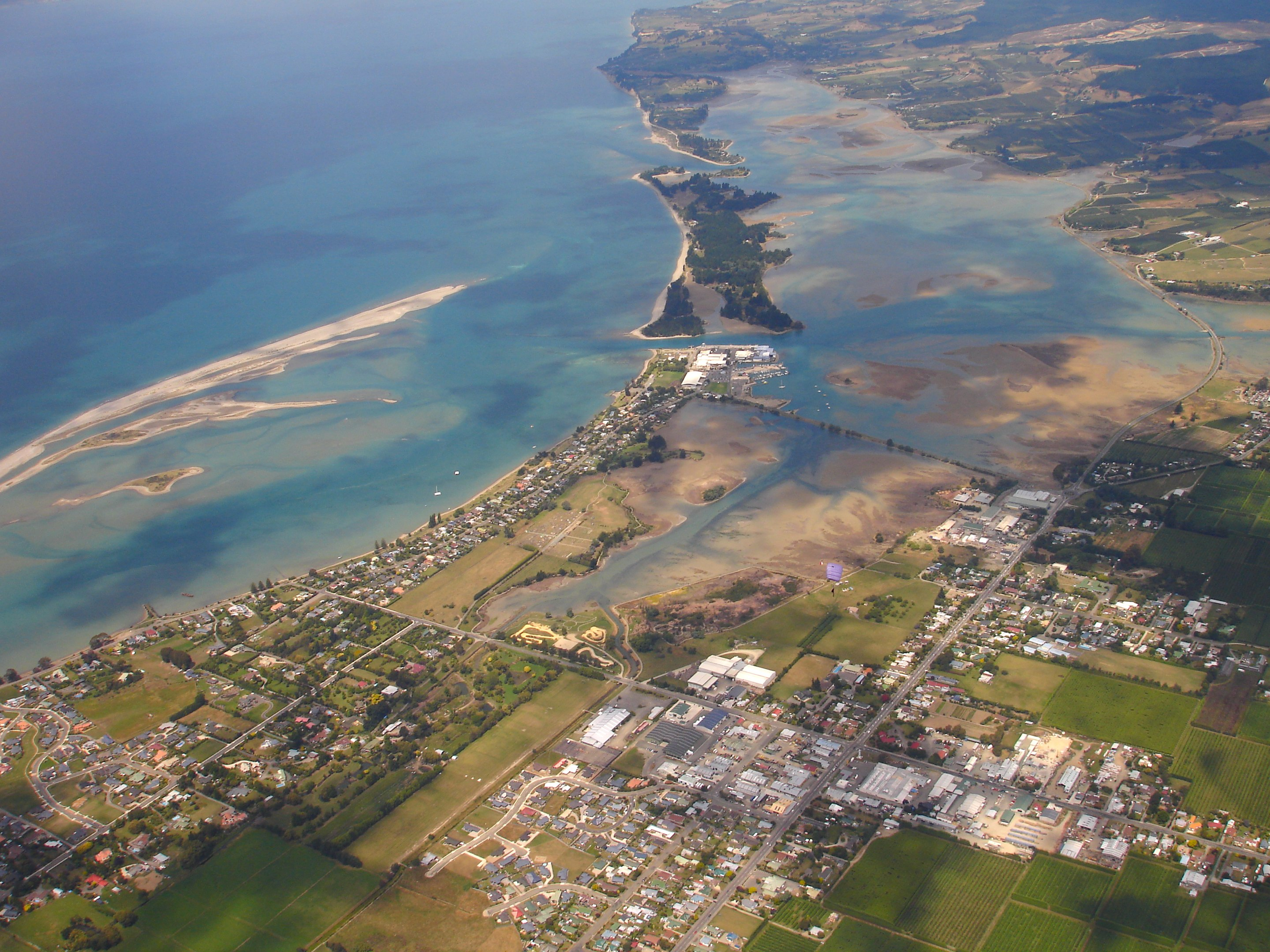
- An aerial view of Motueka looking east
- Nickname: "Mot"
- Interactive map of Motueka
- Coordinates: 41°07′24″S 173°00′53″E
- Country: New Zealand
- Territorial authority: Tasman
- Ward: Motueka Ward
- Community: Motueka Community
- Electorates: West Coast-Tasman; Te Tai Tonga (Māori)

Government
  - Territorial Authority: Tasman District Council
  - Mayor of Tasman: Tim King
  - West Coast-Tasman MP: Katie Milne
  - Te Tai Tonga MP: Mananui Ramsden

Area
  - Total: 12.68 km^{2} (4.90 sq mi)

Population (June 2025)
  - Total: 8,290
  - Density: 654/km^{2} (1,690/sq mi)
- Time zone: UTC+12 (NZST)
  - Summer (DST): UTC+13 (NZDT)
- Postal codes: 7120, 7196, 7197, 7198
- Area code: 03

Motueka is a town in the South Island of New Zealand, close to the mouth of the Motueka River on the western shore of Tasman Bay. It is the second largest in the Tasman Region, with a population of 8,290 as of June 2025.

The surrounding district has a number of apple, pear, and kiwifruit orchards, as well as growing a variety of specialised crops such as hops. The area formerly served as the main centre of tobacco growing in New Zealand until the early 1980s. A number of small vineyards have also been developed.

Nearby beaches (such as Kaiteretere and Mārahau) are very popular with holidaymakers, and the area around Motueka has one of the country's highest annual sunshine-hour indices. Riwaka lies 4.8 km north of Motueka via State Highway 60 and Nelson is 41.7 km to the east of Motueka via State Highway 60 and State Highway 6.

Motueka, as one of the nearest towns to the Abel Tasman and Kahurangi National Parks, has become the base of many tourism ventures, as well as in Nelson Lakes National Park, and in other recreational areas. Extensive limestone cave systems (including Harwoods Hole in the Tākaka Hill area north of Motueka) attract cavers and rock climbers. Sea kayaking, tramping, and canyoning now attract many thousands of visitors each year.

Many artists live in the area around Motueka, especially potters and reggae musicians. The Riverside Community, in nearby Lower Moutere, is a pacifist intentional community. Founded in the 1940s, it is New Zealand's oldest cooperative living community.

== Name ==
The name Motueka, or more correctly Motuweka, comes from the Māori language, and means weka island, the weka being a bird of the rail family. The town is colloquially called "Mot" by some residents.

== History ==
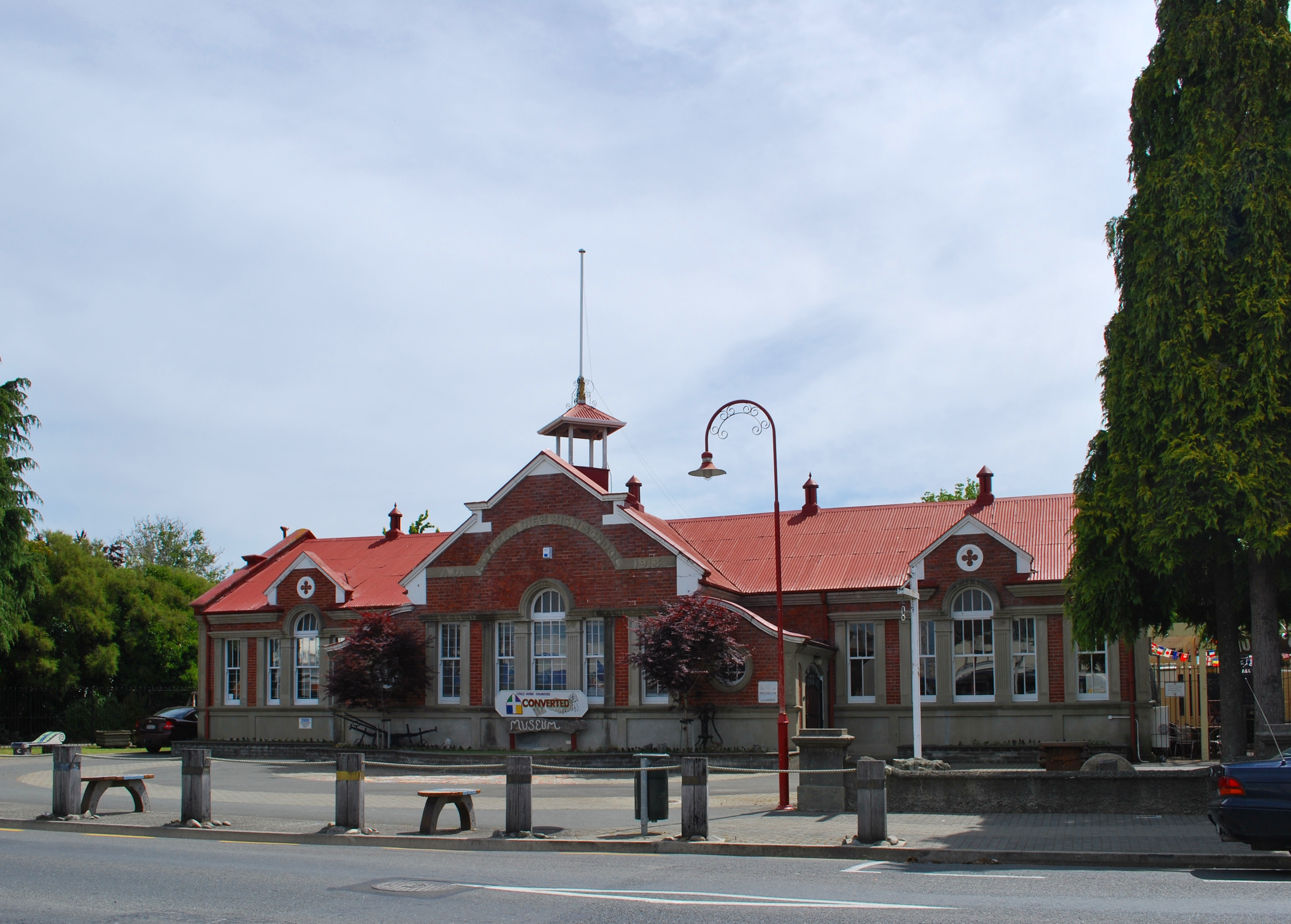
The Motueka District Museum

The first known European visitor to the coast near Motueka in 1827 was French explorer Jules Dumont d'Urville, of the French corvette Astrolabe. He explored and described much of the Tasman Bay shore line. Three ships carrying the New Zealand Company's Nelson expedition, led by Captain Arthur Wakefield, anchored at Astrolabe Roads, north of Kaiteretere Beach—about 16 kilometres (10 mi) due north of Motueka—in October 1841. Kaiteretere was selected as a site for the first settlement but was later abandoned in favour of Nelson Haven.

The exceptional fertility of the soil and the suitability of the surrounding land for small farm settlement were the main reasons for the establishment of the second town of the Nelson settlement at Motueka in 1842. There was trade between Nelson and Motueka in vegetables and timber in the 1840s. In 1850, Motueka had "a church, various tradespeople, a general store, a doctor, a clergyman, a magistrate and a constable". Motueka was described as "the village was laid out in small sections in the middle of a splendid bush, and had some good open land all around on which the farms were situated” in the 1850s. A significant flood hit Motueka in 1877 with the majority of buildings in the High Street being flooded.

During the period, 1853 to 1876, Motueka was administrated as part of the Nelson Province. With the abolition of provinces and Counties Act 1876, Motueka became part of the newly-formed Waimea County.

Motueka was proclaimed to be a borough on 6 December 1899 As a borough, Motueka became responsible for its own local governance; the first meeting of the Motueka Borough Council was held on 17 January 1900. The population at that time was 900 people with 182 ratepayers and 183 dwellings. The post office building was opened in 1902 by Sir Joseph Ward.

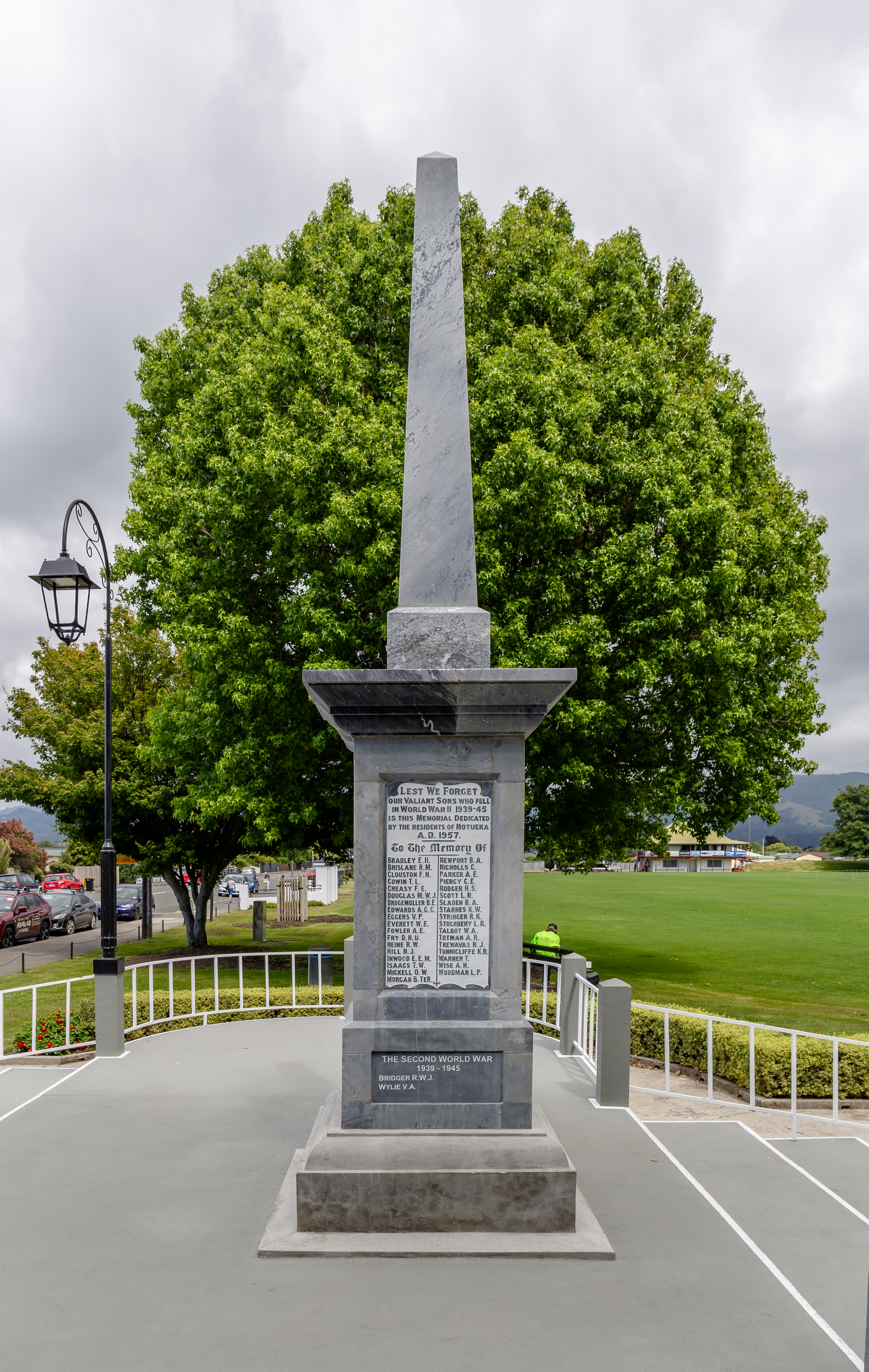
Motueka war memorial

The Motueka war memorial was unveiled in 1922. It commemorates the 32 soldiers who died in WWI from the Motueka district. A plaque on the war memorial was unveiled in 1957 to commemorate the 35 soldiers who died in WWII from the Motueka district.

== Demographics ==
The population of Motueka in 1951 was 2464 people which increased to 2824 people in 1956 and 3310 people in 1961.

Stats NZ describes Motueka as a small urban area. It covers 12.68 km^{2} (4.90 sq mi) and had an estimated population of 8,290 as of June 2025, with a population density of 654 people per km^{2}.

Historical population
Year	Pop.	±% p.a.
2006	6,624	—
2013	7,110	+1.02%
2018	7,998	+2.38%
2023	8,190	+0.48%
The 2006 population is for a larger area of 13.66 km^{2}. Source:

Motueka had a population of 8,190 in the 2023 New Zealand census, an increase of 192 people (2.4%) since the 2018 census, and an increase of 1,080 people (15.2%) since the 2013 census. There were 4,047 males, 4,119 females, and 24 people of other genders in 3,291 dwellings. 2.6% of people identified as LGBTIQ+. The median age was 47.7 years (compared with 38.1 years nationally). There were 1,206 people (14.7%) aged under 15 years, 1,227 (15.0%) aged 15 to 29, 3,393 (41.4%) aged 30 to 64, and 2,364 (28.9%) aged 65 or older.

People could identify as more than one ethnicity. The results were 82.5% European (Pākehā); 15.7% Māori; 5.8% Pasifika; 6.5% Asian; 0.8% Middle Eastern, Latin American and African New Zealanders (MELAA); and 3.2% other, which includes people giving their ethnicity as "New Zealander". English was spoken by 97.4%, Māori by 3.5%, Samoan by 1.0%, and other languages by 11.0%. No language could be spoken by 1.4% (e.g. too young to talk). New Zealand Sign Language was known by 0.4%. The percentage of people born overseas was 22.4, compared with 28.8% nationally.

Religious affiliations were 30.9% Christian, 0.5% Hindu, 0.3% Islam, 0.8% Māori religious beliefs, 1.7% Buddhist, 0.6% New Age, and 1.4% other religions. People who answered that they had no religion were 56.2%, and 7.7% of people did not answer the census question.

Of those at least 15 years old, 963 (13.8%) people had a bachelor's or higher degree, 3,705 (53.0%) had a post-high school certificate or diploma, and 2,322 (33.2%) people exclusively held high school qualifications. The median income was $31,200, compared with $41,500 nationally. 324 people (4.6%) earned over $100,000 compared to 12.1% nationally. The employment status of those at least 15 was 2,952 (42.3%) full-time, 1,014 (14.5%) part-time, and 135 (1.9%) unemployed.

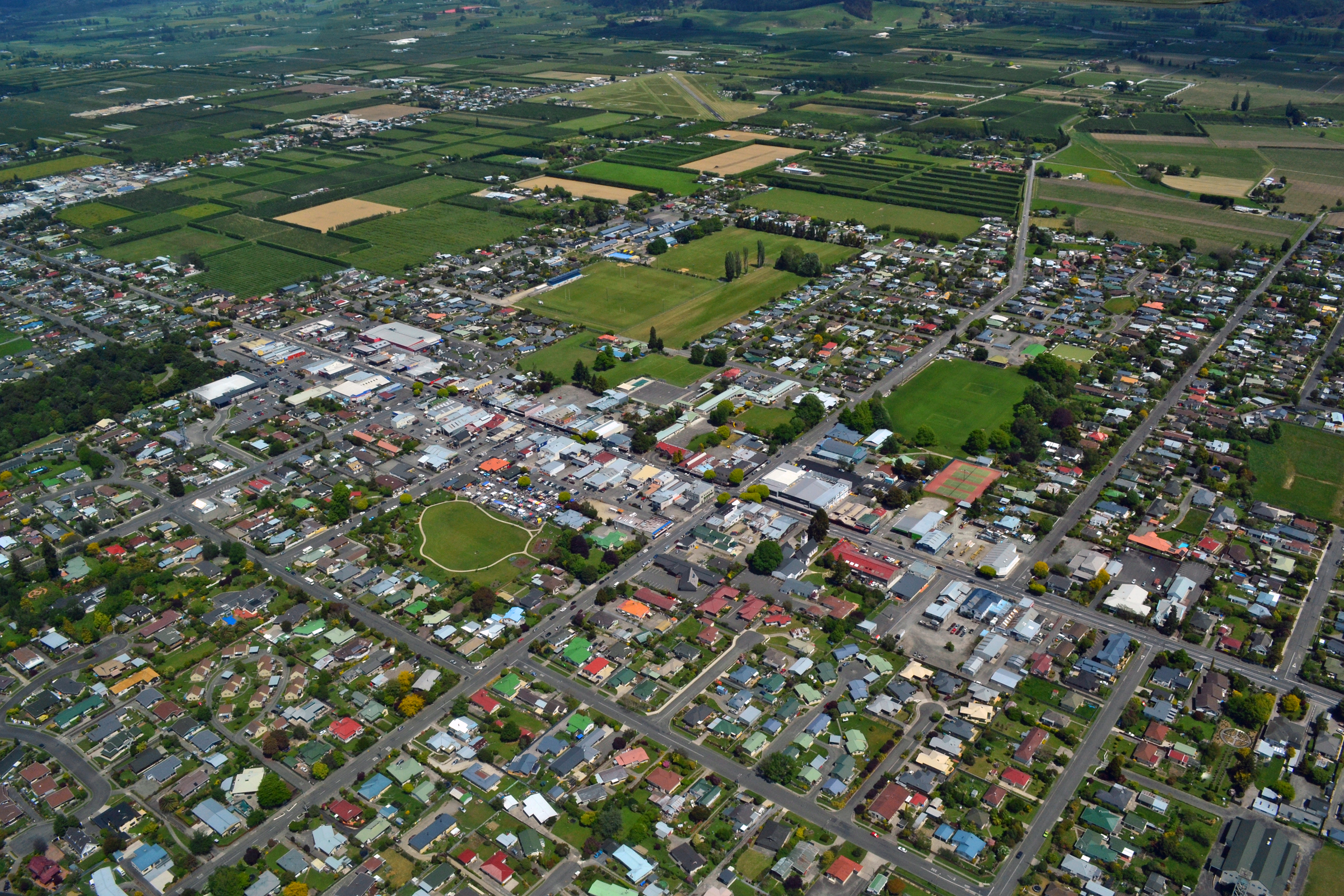
Motueka looking toward the south-west and the airport

Individual statistical areas
Name	Area (km^{2})	Population	Density (per km^{2})	Dwellings	Median age	Median income
Motueka North	1.57	2,490	1,586	1,029	48.1 years	$31,000
Motueka West	7.87	2,625	334	930	41.8 years	$32,300
Motueka East	3.25	3,078	947	1,332	52.7 years	$30,500
New Zealand					38.1 years	$41,500

== Geography and climate ==
Motueka is situated on the small Motueka Plain near the Motueka River which enters Tasman Bay about 4 km north of the town. To the west of the valley the land rises steeply to the Arthur and Pikiruna Ranges, and to the south the flat is broken by the gently rolling Moutere Hills.

The source of the Pearse River near Motueka is the deepest known cold-water cave in the world.

Motueka has an oceanic climate (Cfb) with cool, wet winters and mild, drier summers.

Climate data for Motueka (1991–2020 normals, extremes 1956–present)
Month	Jan	Feb	Mar	Apr	May	Jun	Jul	Aug	Sep	Oct	Nov	Dec	Year
Record high °C (°F)	34.0 (93.2)	36.2 (97.2)	31.4 (88.5)	27.3 (81.1)	25.1 (77.2)	21.8 (71.2)	19.9 (67.8)	21.9 (71.4)	24.1 (75.4)	27.2 (81.0)	29.8 (85.6)	31.9 (89.4)	36.2 (97.2)
Mean maximum °C (°F)	28.9 (84.0)	28.6 (83.5)	26.9 (80.4)	23.2 (73.8)	21.4 (70.5)	18.1 (64.6)	16.8 (62.2)	18.8 (65.8)	21.1 (70.0)	23.4 (74.1)	25.7 (78.3)	27.4 (81.3)	29.8 (85.6)
Mean daily maximum °C (°F)	23.7 (74.7)	23.7 (74.7)	22.0 (71.6)	18.8 (65.8)	16.3 (61.3)	13.5 (56.3)	13.0 (55.4)	14.2 (57.6)	16.1 (61.0)	18.2 (64.8)	20.0 (68.0)	22.1 (71.8)	18.5 (65.2)
Daily mean °C (°F)	17.9 (64.2)	17.8 (64.0)	16.0 (60.8)	13.0 (55.4)	10.4 (50.7)	7.8 (46.0)	7.1 (44.8)	8.5 (47.3)	10.4 (50.7)	12.5 (54.5)	14.2 (57.6)	16.6 (61.9)	12.7 (54.8)
Mean daily minimum °C (°F)	12.1 (53.8)	12.0 (53.6)	10.0 (50.0)	7.2 (45.0)	4.5 (40.1)	2.1 (35.8)	1.2 (34.2)	2.7 (36.9)	4.8 (40.6)	6.7 (44.1)	8.3 (46.9)	11.0 (51.8)	6.9 (44.4)
Mean minimum °C (°F)	6.5 (43.7)	6.7 (44.1)	4.9 (40.8)	1.6 (34.9)	−1.1 (30.0)	−2.9 (26.8)	−3.3 (26.1)	−2.3 (27.9)	−0.5 (31.1)	1.3 (34.3)	2.7 (36.9)	5.3 (41.5)	−3.8 (25.2)
Record low °C (°F)	2.8 (37.0)	2.0 (35.6)	0.9 (33.6)	−1.5 (29.3)	−4.8 (23.4)	−4.9 (23.2)	−6.2 (20.8)	−4.4 (24.1)	−2.6 (27.3)	−1.8 (28.8)	0.4 (32.7)	1.9 (35.4)	−6.2 (20.8)
Average rainfall mm (inches)	82.5 (3.25)	80.8 (3.18)	79.4 (3.13)	111.3 (4.38)	121.5 (4.78)	143.8 (5.66)	119.5 (4.70)	128.1 (5.04)	111.1 (4.37)	110.7 (4.36)	82.1 (3.23)	99.0 (3.90)	1,269.8 (49.98)
Source: NIWA

== Churches and religion ==
=== St Thomas's Anglican church ===
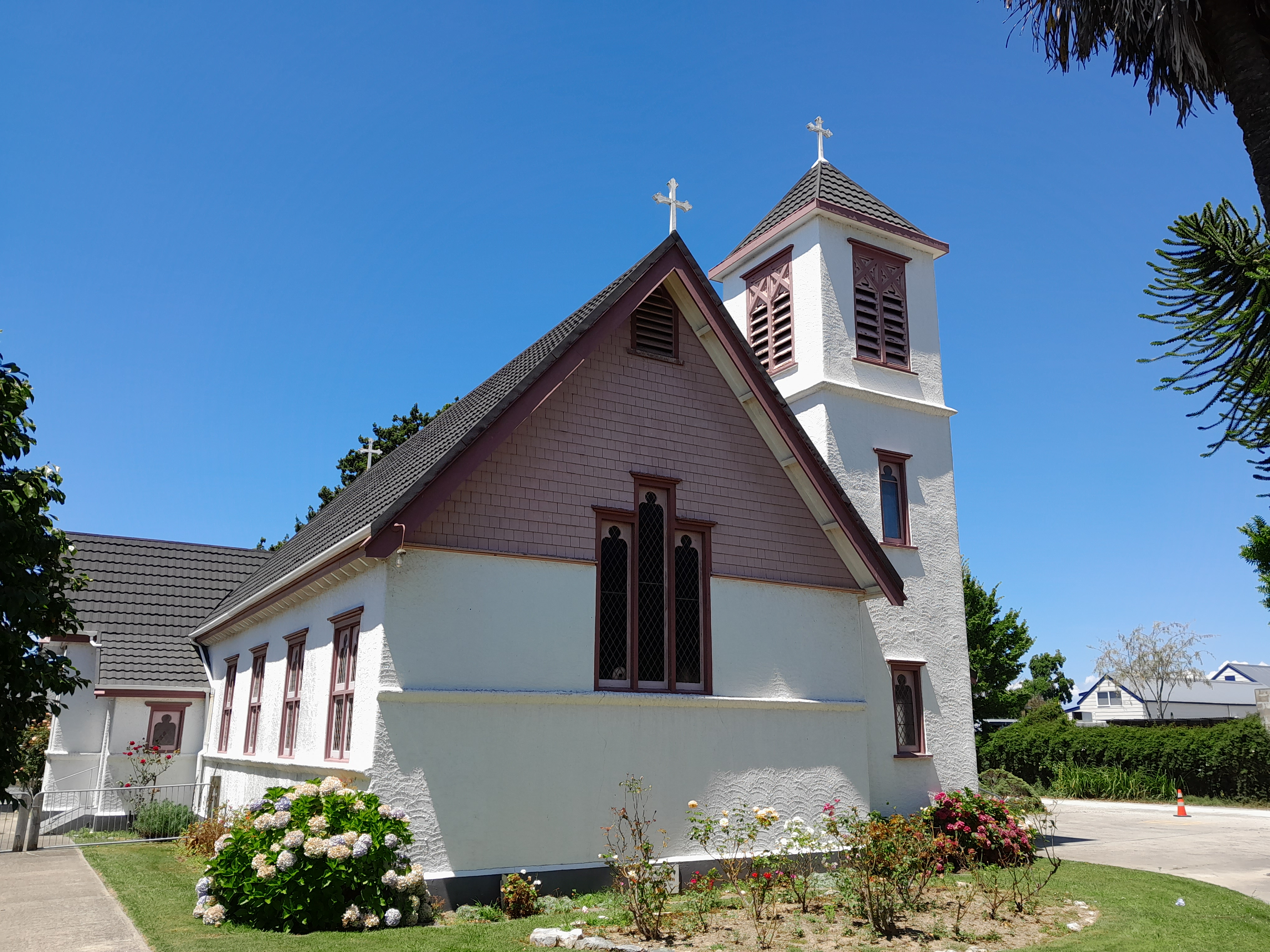
St Thomas's Anglican church (2023)

St Thomas's Anglican church, located at 101 High street, was listed as a category two historic place in 1982. It was built in 1911.

=== Former Catholic church ===
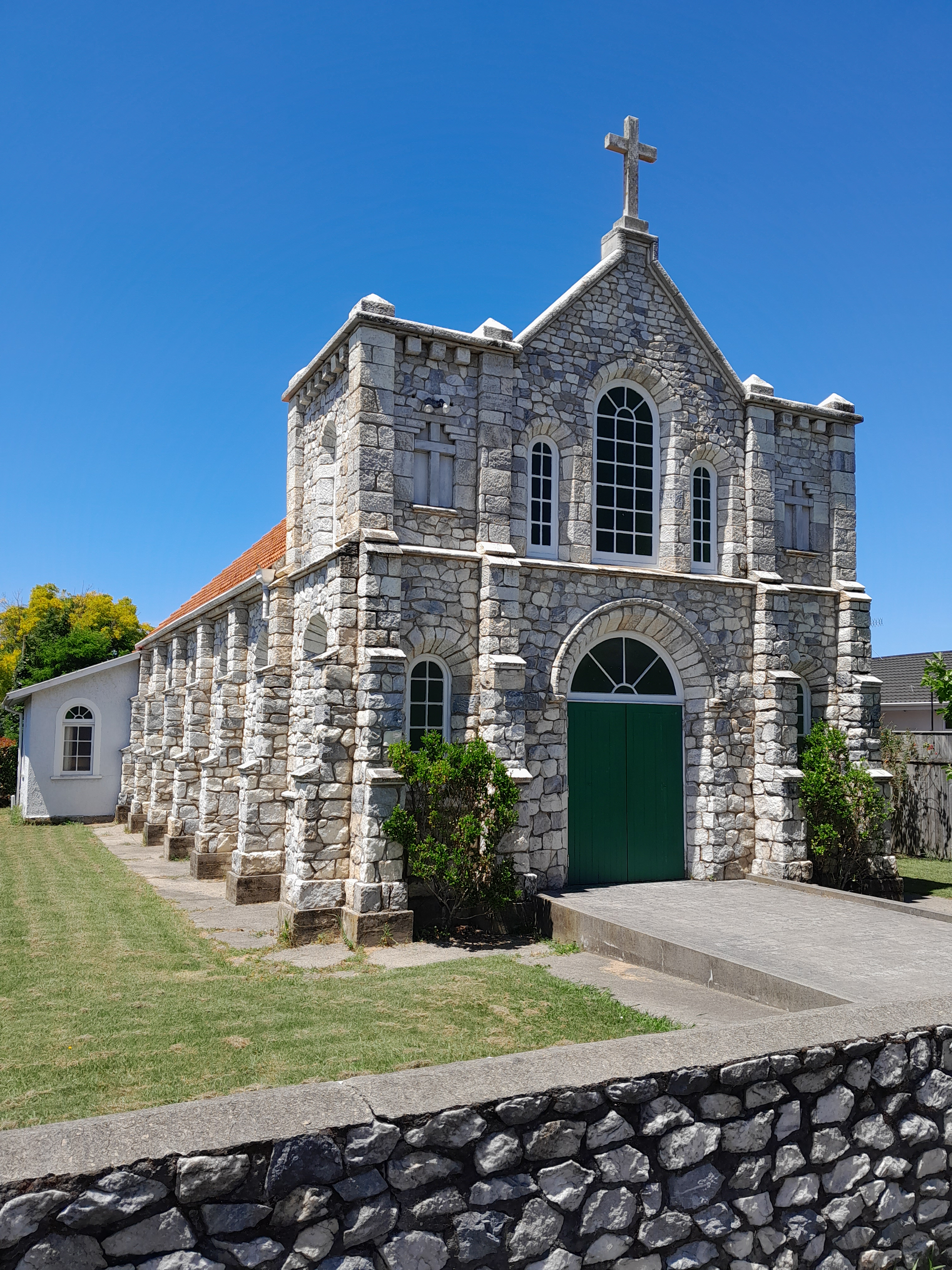
The former Motueka Catholic church (2023)

The former Catholic church, located at 31 High street, was listed as a category two historic place in 1982. St Peters Chanel church was consecrated in 1917 and was built out of marble from Tākaka. In 1985, the church was replaced by a larger church for the congregation.

=== St Andrew's church ===
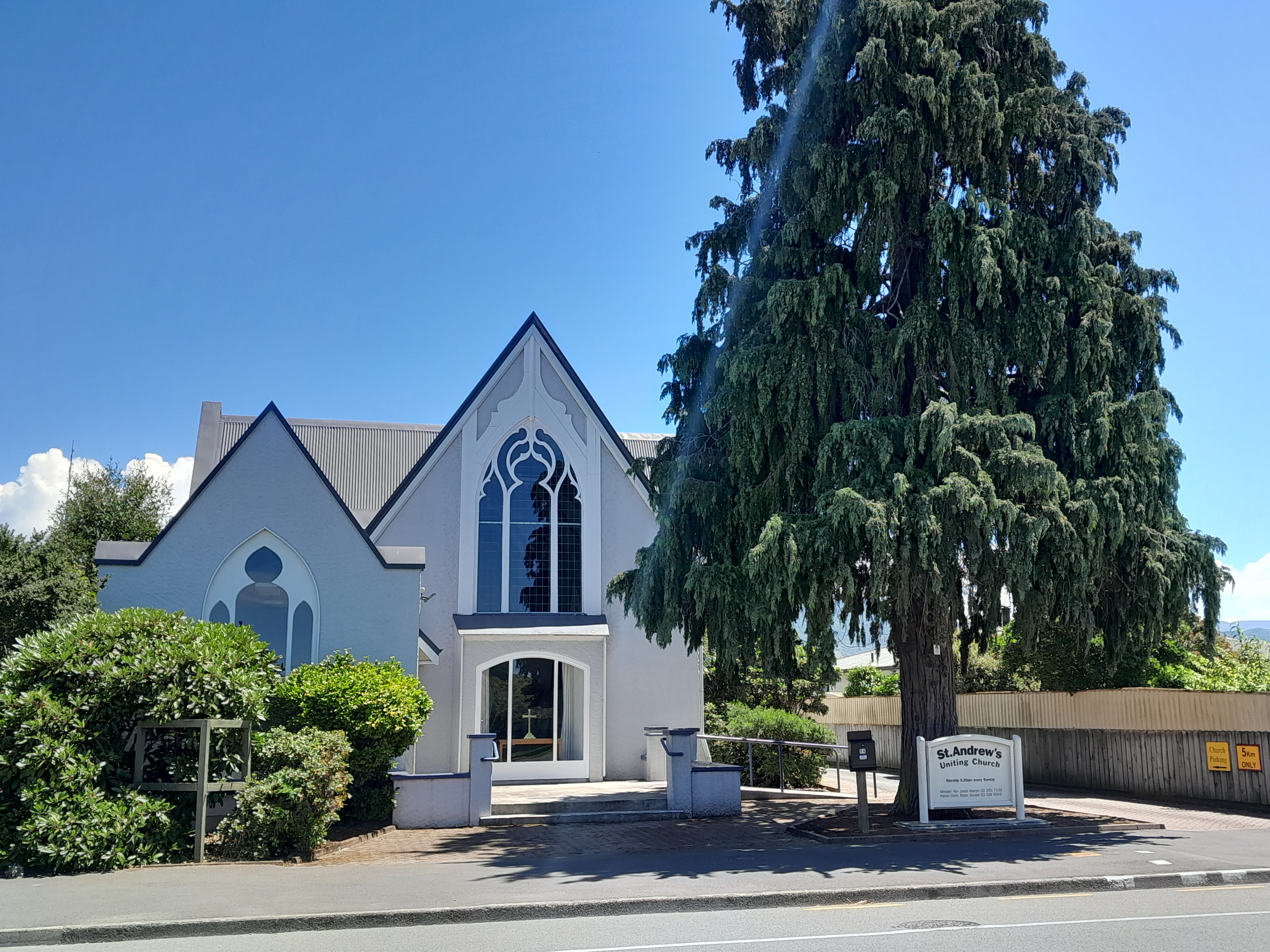
St Andrew's Church, Motueka (2023)

St Andrew's church, located at 64 High street, was listed as a category two historic place in 1982.

=== Plymouth Brethren ===
Motueka once served as a centre for the Plymouth Brethren: their New Zealand patriarch James George Deck (1807–1884) died in Motueka and lies buried in Motueka cemetery.

== Amenities ==
=== Motueka district museum ===
The Motueka district museum is located in the former Motueka district high school buildings (built 1913) at 140 High Street. The museum includes exhibitions on local history.

=== Library ===
The Motueka library is located at 32 Wallace Street. It was rebuilt in 2022 and cost just over $4.92 million. It is over twice the size of the previous library on Pah St.

=== Saltwater pool ===
Motueka is home to a saltwater pool which is located on the Motueka foreshore. It was originally built after a sighting of a shark in the 1920s. Originally a wire cage, in 1938, it was rebuilt as a pool and then upgraded in 1950 and 1992.

=== Golf course ===
The Motueka golf club was awarded the Holden New Zealand golf club of the year in 2018. It is located on Harbour Road in Motueka.

=== Motueka recreation centre ===
The Motueka recreation centre includes a stadium, climbing wall, a fitness lounge, a theatre facility, games room, a skating rink and netball courts. It is operated by Sport Tasman and is located at 40 Old Wharf Road. The climbing wall was refurbished in 2016.

== Economy ==
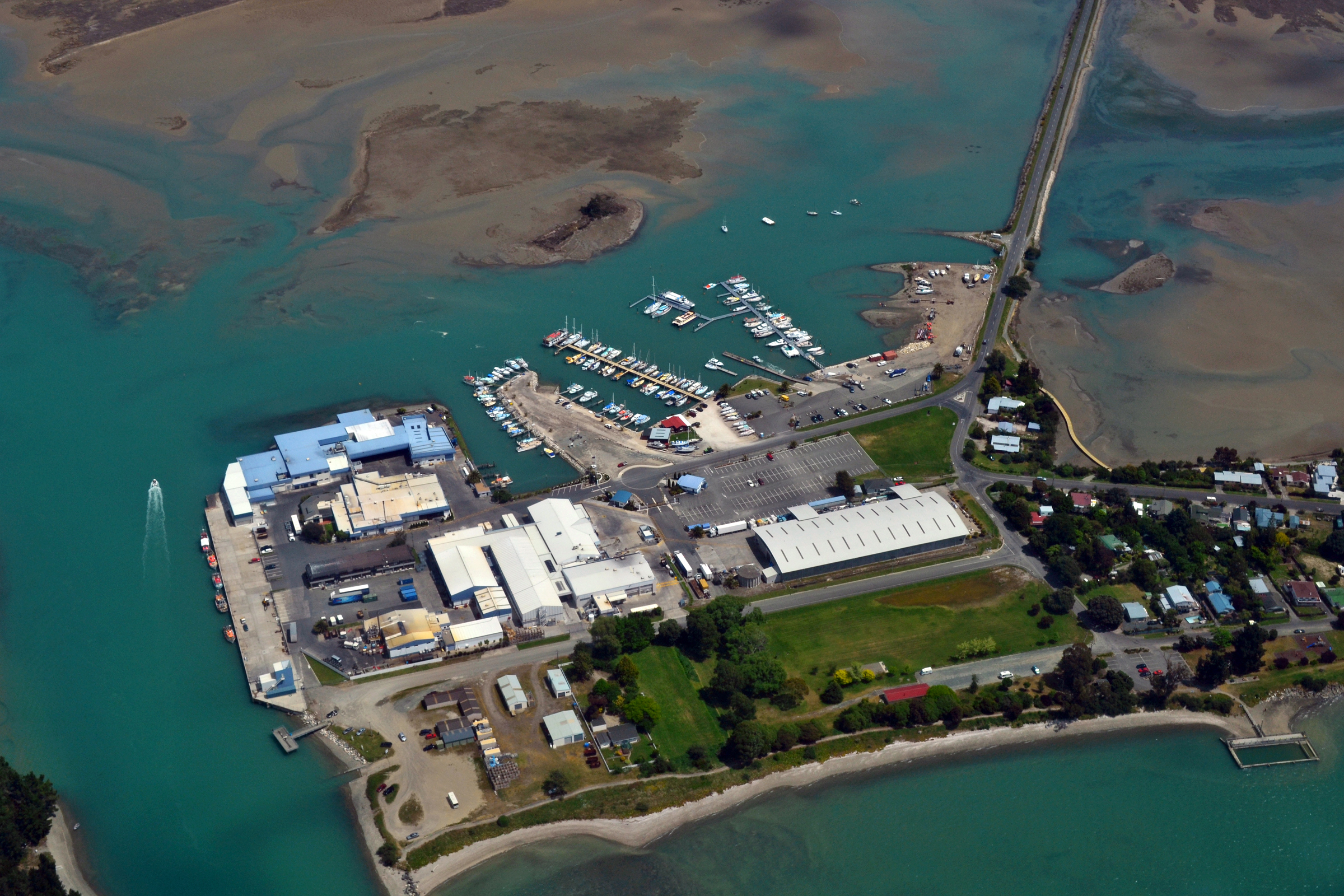
Talley's Seafood Division at Port Motueka

Horticulture is the main industry in the area surrounding Motueka, and the town benefits directly from this. Some of the main crops are apples, beer hops and kiwifruit. Sheep and cattle farming also contribute to the local economy.

Due to the seasonal growth of many crops, the town's population increases greatly with seasonal workers, especially during late summer and early autumn for the apple 'pick'.

At the height of tobacco production, Motueka was home to two tobacco factories. One owned by Australian company WD & HO Wills Holdings and the other by Rothmans International. The tobacco industry has ceased to exist in the area in the early 1980s, when the New Zealand government removed the requirement for some New Zealand grown tobacco to be included in locally produced cigarettes.

Major employers in Motueka include:

- Genia (formally MLC Group), operates a timber processing facility that specialises in cut-to-length componentry, small end section and specialised timber mouldings.
- Nelson Aviation College trains pilots for the aviation industry.
- Prolam has manufacturing facilities in Lower Moutere and Riwaka (previously Prime Pine) that produce glulam beams, i beams, LVL timber, posts, wood flooring, timber retaining walls and mid floors.
- Talley's Group was established in 1936 by Ivan Peter Talijancich. One of the town's largest employers, the company's Port Motueka site incorporates the Group Head Office, the Seafood Division and the Dairy Division. The Vegetable Division began operations in 1978 at Motueka, but has since been relocated to Blenheim and Ashburton. Seafood processing contributed $46.5 million (10.9%) to the local economy in 2021.
- CJ Industries is a construction and landscaping company.

New Zealand Energy Limited is a Motueka-based company that operates small hydroelectric power stations in Haast, Fox, Ōpunake and Raetihi.

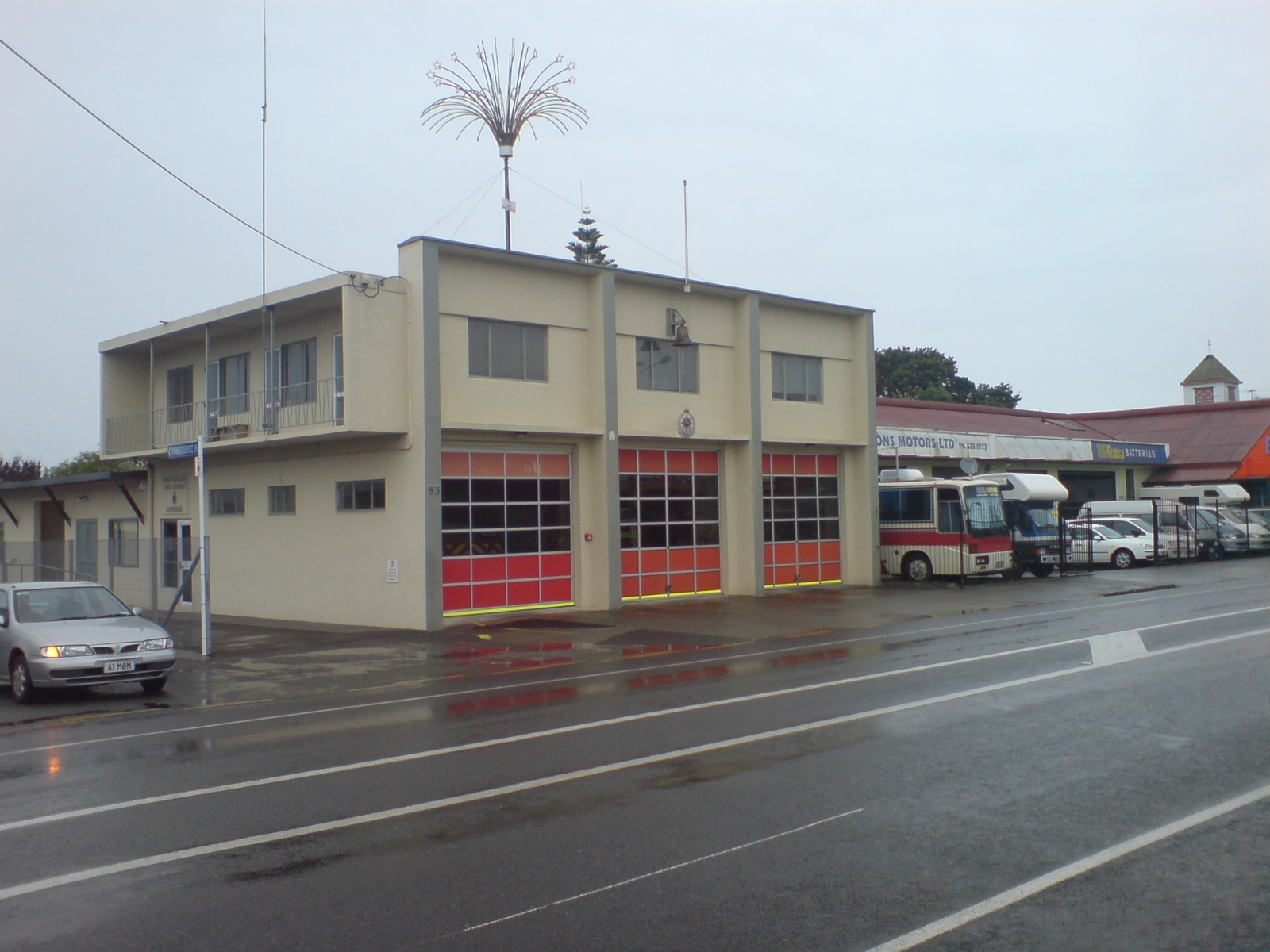
Motueka Fire Station

== Government ==
=== Local ===
From 1853 to 1876, Motueka was administered as part of the Nelson Province.

The Motueka Borough Council was formed in 1900 and existed until 1989, when local government reforms saw it merged into the Tasman District Council. Today the Motueka Ward is represented by three councillors and includes the nearby settlements of Kaiteretere, Mārahau, Ngātīmoti and Riwaka.

=== National ===
The electorate of Motueka and Massacre Bay was created for the 1853 New Zealand general election and was succeeded by the electorate of Motueka in the 1860–1861 general election which lasted until 1890. In 1896 the Motueka electorate was recreated, and lasted until 1946. Today Motueka is part of the West Coast-Tasman electorate.

== Education ==
Motueka High School is a co-educational state secondary school for Year 9 to 13 students, with a roll of 718 as of July 2026. It opened in 1955, replacing Motueka District High School which opened in 1902.

There are two co-educational state primary schools in the township for Year 1 to 8 students: Parklands School, with a roll of 199, and Motueka South School, with a roll of 170. Parklands began as Motueka Primary School in 1857, and moved to the site now occupied by the Motueka Museum in 1866. The District High School grew from Motuka Primary School. In 1944 the primary school moved to its current site, and changed its name to Parklands in 1956 after the formation of Motueka High School. Motueka South School opened in 1958.

There are two private primary schools in the township for Year 1 to 8 students: Motueka Steiner School, with a roll of 85, and St Peter Chanel School, with a roll of 90. Motuaka Steiner School started in 2002, with a kindergarten earlier opened in 1984. St Peter Chanel School opened in 1957.

There are also five other primary schools in the area surrounding Motueka.

== Media ==
=== Newspaper ===
There are two local newspapers in Motueka: The Guardian Motueka, out every Wednesday and The Tasman Leader, out every Thursday. The "Motueka Star" was established in August 1901, and was a six-page newspaper, published twice weekly.

=== Radio ===
The area has a local radio station, Fresh FM, which also broadcasts to Blenheim, Nelson, Tākaka and Tasman.

== Transport ==
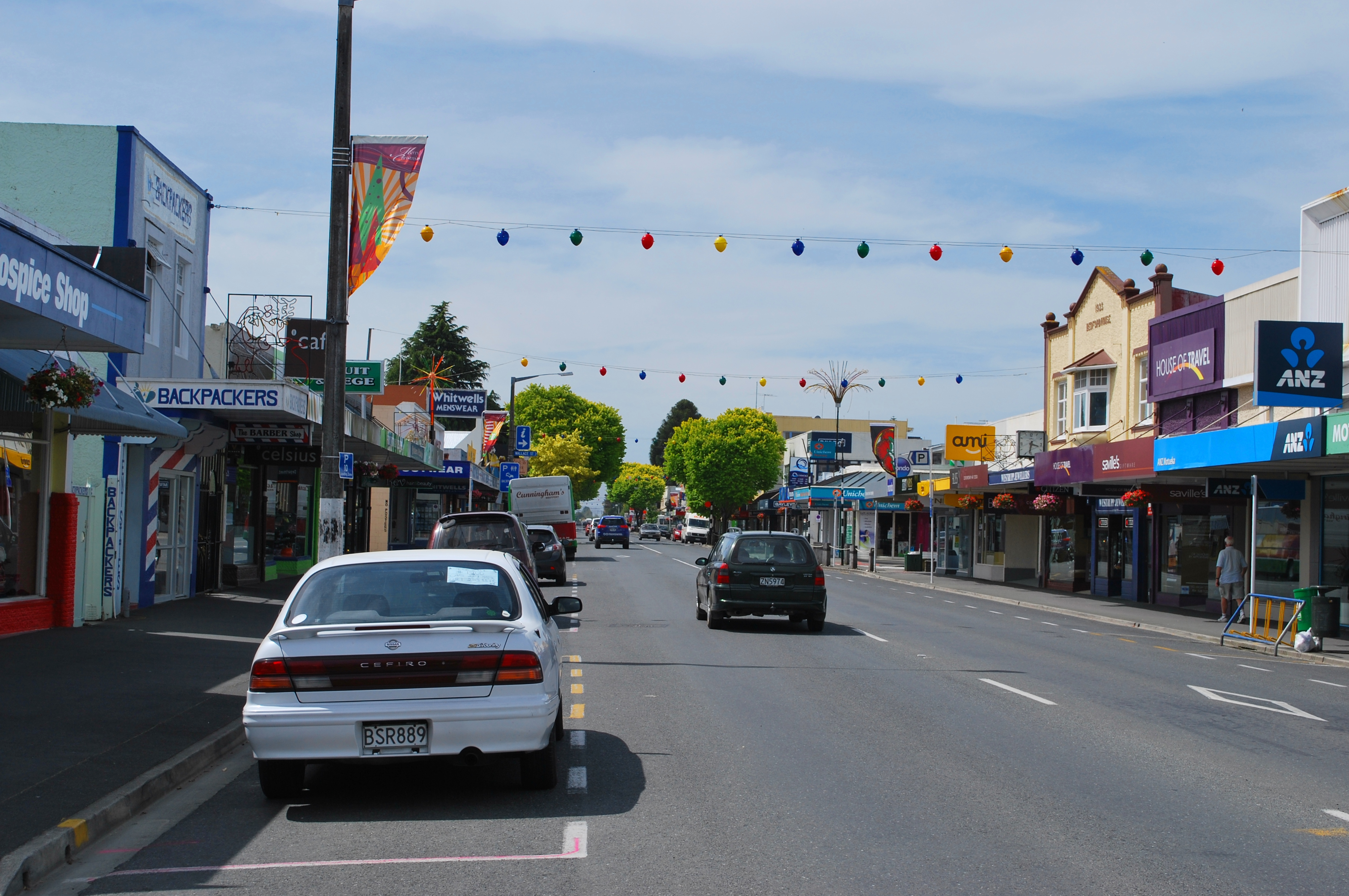
State Highway 60 runs through the centre of Motueka.

=== Road ===
Motueka is served by State Highway 60 which runs 114.5 kilometres (71.1 mi) from Collingwood in Golden Bay / Mohua to State Highway 6 near Richmond.

The former State Highway 61, now known as the Motueka Valley Highway, connects State Highway 60 at Motueka to State Highway 6 at Kohatu Junction near Tapawera.

=== Port ===
Port Motueka, 3 kilometres (2 mi) south-east of Motueka, on a tidal lagoon of 764 hectares (1,890 acres), provides sheltered berthage for coastal vessels.

=== Airport ===
The Motueka Aerodrome is 3 kilometres (2 mi) west of the town centre and serves as a base for the Motueka Aero Club and the Nelson Aviation College. In 1984, Motueka Air started scheduled passenger flights from Motueka to Wellington, New Zealand using a Piper Aztec aircraft. Within a couple of years the Motueka Air network had grown to include Nelson, Wellington and Palmerston North using additional Piper Chieftains. In 1988, Motueka Air was renamed Air Nelson and relocated to Nelson Airport.

== Culture and arts ==
=== Marae ===
Te Āwhina Marae is located in Motueka. It is a marae (meeting ground) for Ngāti Rārua, and Te Atiawa o Te Waka-a-Māui, and includes the Turangāpeke wharenui (meeting house).

=== Festivals ===
Motueka hosts the Kaiteriteri Carnival and Motueka Festival of Lights.

== Sport ==
=== Mountain biking ===
Motueka sits on the Tasman's Great Taste Trail which is a mountain bike trail connecting the towns of Nelson, Wakefield, Richmond, Motueka and Kaiteretere.

=== Teams ===
- Golden Bay-Motueka Rugby Union
- Tasman Rugby Union

== Sister cities ==
Motueka is twinned with:

- Kiyosato, Hokkaido, Japan

== Notable people ==
- Danforth Greenwood, physician
- Sarah Greenwood, artist
- Denis Aberhart, cricketer
- Michael Bennett, film director, screenwriter
- George Black, politician
- Tony Blain, cricketer
- Ann Boyce, New Zealand pioneer and herbalist.
- Edward Chaytor, military commander
- Bevan Congdon, cricketer
- Josh Coppins, professional motocross racer
- Herbert Curtis, politician
- James George Deck, evangelist
- Shannon Francois, netballer
- Owen Franks, Rugby Player, Crusaders, All Black
- David Havili, Rugby Player, Crusaders, All Black
- Ruth Gilbert, poet
- Toni Hodgkinson, middle-distance runner
- Keith Holyoake, Prime Minister of New Zealand
- Denny Hulme, 1967 Formula One world champion
- Richmond Hursthouse, politician
- Simon Mannering, rugby league player
- Roderick McKenzie, politician
- Glenn Milnes, cricketer
- Walter Moffatt, Mayor of Nelson
- Michael Myers, Chief Justice of New Zealand
- Charles Parker, politician
- Richard Hudson, politician
- Alfred Christopher Picard, politician
- Bill Rowling, politician
- Jerry Skinner, politician
- Shelton Woolright, musician, best known as the drummer for Blindspott
- Florence Young, missionary
