= Gordon Forlong =

Gordon Forlong (14 February 1819 – 30 August 1908) was a Scottish and New Zealand evangelist. He was also a lawyer, businessman, and farmer.

== Early life ==
Born in Pollok Castle, Renfrewshire, Scotland, on 14 February 1819, the son of William Forlong, a merchant, Gordon Forlong was educated at Glasgow Grammar School. He went on to study at the University of Glasgow and the University of Edinburgh, where he graduated in law. He was admitted to the Bar around 1842 and practised as an advocate in Aberdeen.

His education had made him a believer in deism, and he had earlier resisted the wishes of his great-uncle, Sir Robert Pollock, to become a minister in the Episcopal Church of Scotland, the Scottish branch of the Anglican Communion. While in London, however, Forlong was converted to Evangelical Christianity by a fellow-businessman.

On 15 January 1852 he married Laura Isabella Ansley of Bath, Somerset, in Margate, Kent. They had two daughters, Clara and Amy. Laura died in 1854, and Forlong remarried, on 9 June 1857, to Elizabeth Anna Houlton, in Paddington, London. They had 11 children.

After his conversion he began travelling widely as a lay preacher and evangelist, but returned to Scotland around 1859–60 and played a prominent role in the Second Great Awakening, which broke out in Scotland around that time. He controversially supported the idea that women were allowed to preach. He publicised the services by Jessie Macfarlane increasing her audiences in Edinburgh and Glasgow.

Forlong moved back to London around 1863, and around 1868 he founded Talbot Tabernacle in Notting Hill, where he remained until emigrating to New Zealand in 1876. A noted member of the congregation was Lord Congleton.

== New Zealand evangelist ==
With his second wife and their children, Forlong departed for New Zealand in May 1876 and arrived in Wellington on 4 August. Forlong acquired a farm near Bulls in the Rangitikei district and began preaching in the Bulls Town Hall. From 1880 to 1883, he moved to Dunedin and held revival meetings at the Great King Street Congregational Church and in the Queen's Theatre. Returning to Rangitikei, he held meetings in collaboration with the Salvation Army. In 1887, he moved to nearby Whanganui, where in November 1894 Elizabeth died. Around 1905, Forlong relocated to Rongotea, where he died on 30 August 1908.

== Analysis ==
Forlong was a religious fundamentalist who lived by the motto of "No compromise, no quarter, and no surrender." Mourners at his funeral eulogised him as "the last of the Puritans." In his associations, however, he was not denominationally partial. Although he played a pivotal role in founding what became the Open Brethren movement in New Zealand, and the Christian Brethren Church of New Zealand today remembers him as a pioneer, he disagreed with the insularity and isolationism of some of his fellow-Brethren and never committed himself exclusively to the Brethren movement. He preached in churches of different denominations, and was particularly supportive of the Salvation Army.
