= James George Deck =

James George Deck (1 November 1807 – 14 August 1884) was a British-born New Zealand evangelist.

== Life ==
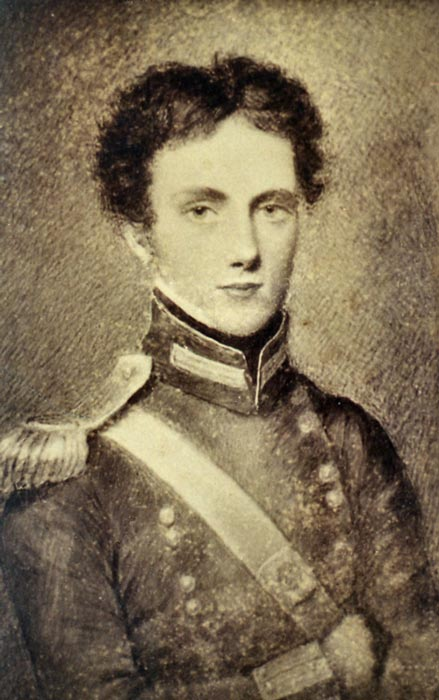
James George Deck in military uniform of the 14th Madras Infantry

Deck was born in Bury St Edmunds, Suffolk, England, to John Deck, a postmaster, and Mary (née Welch or Welsh). His ancestors included Huguenots who left France before the revocation of the Edict of Nantes in 1685. Well-educated, he could speak fluent French and was literate in Hebrew, Greek, and Latin. After receiving military training in Paris at the age of 17 he joined the British East India Company, and he purchased a military commission with the 14th Madras Infantry, where he served from 1824 to 1826.

After returning to England, Deck experienced an evangelical conversion and entered a private Anglican theological college, at Westbury-on-Trym. On 22 April 1829 he married Alicia Feild, the daughter of his tutor the Rev. Samuel Feild. In India, he resigned his commission in 1835 for religious reasons, and returned to England, tutoring the sons of Indian Army officers. Intending to enter the Anglican ministry, he became involved with the Plymouth Brethren instead; he was baptised by full immersion and became an evangelist for the movement, preaching first in Taunton and then in Weymouth.

When the Bethesda controversy came to a head in 1848, the Brethren movement split into the Exclusive Brethren (led by John Nelson Darby) and the Open Brethren (led by George Mueller). Deck unsuccessfully attempted reconciliation, and then after suffering a stroke and partial paralysis decided to emigrate to New Zealand. With his wife and eight surviving children, he arrived in Wellington on 13 August 1853, and moved to 240 ha of land purchased at Waiwhero, Ngātīmoti, in Nelson Province, joining other former Indian Army officers. Only a few weeks later his wife Alicia died, and his 20-year-old daughter Mary began caring for the family.

In July 1855 Deck married Lewanna Atkinson, who bore five children before she and her youngest son died of measles in 1865. On the first day of 1863 Deck founded the first "formal" Brethren assembly at Ngātīmoti, along with local families such as the Salisburys, although historian Peter Lineham believes that there had already been an informal group meeting on Brethren lines in nearby Motueka for some time. The Nelson Brethren Assemblies rapidly developed thereafter, and when the family moved to Wellington in 1865 Deck's preaching had such effect that more Assemblies were established. After five years he returned to Motueka.

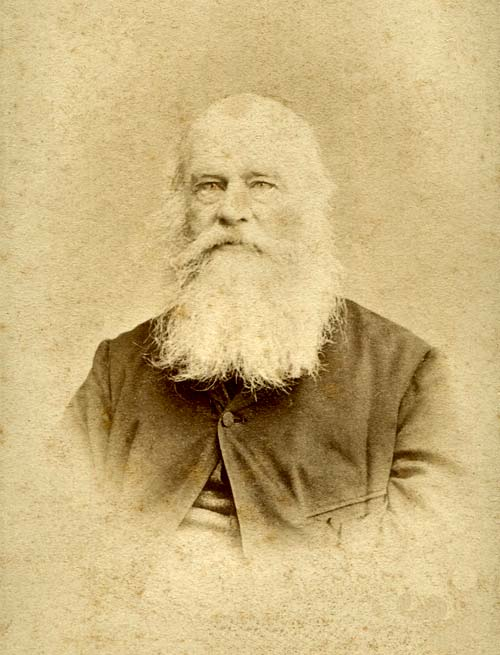
James George Deck late in life, with the splendid white beard for which he was well known

Deck had kept little contact with British Brethren and was unwilling to import the Exclusive-Open schism from the United Kingdom. But in 1875 the news of the division that had occurred in England became known in New Zealand, and with visits by Exclusive Brethren leaders George Wigram and John Nelson Darby the division was enforced, effectively splitting the Brethren movement in New Zealand almost a generation after the split had occurred in the British Isles. After Darby's visit Deck, perhaps reluctantly, sided with the Exclusive Brethren, but refused to isolate himself from assemblies that sided with the Open Brethren. According to Lineham, Deck has some claim to be the founder of both the Exclusive and Open Brethren in New Zealand. Deck appears to have been emotionally affected by the schism, so much so that he ceased writing hymns, for which he is internationally known. He died on 14 August 1884 at Motueka.

== Impact ==
Within 40 years of Deck's first Brethren meeting the 1900 census revealed that nearly 2% of the New Zealand population were Brethren.

The Brethren movement in New Zealand had an influence in New Zealand's rapid social development despite Deck's followers remaining outside of political institutions. One person brought up in the Motueka Assembly who left the Brethren and involved himself in politics was Keith Holyoake who went on to become a long serving Prime Minister and then Governor General.

== Family ==
Deck had fourteen children, nine with Alicia and five with Lewanna. Twelve children survived childhood. After Lewenna's death, Mary again took over caring for the children, and with her sisters established a boarding school for girls at their family home in the Waiwhero Valley and later at "Sandridge", the home on Motueka's Thorp Street where James George Deck lived from around 1874 until his death. Deck's sons and descendants were involved in both "open" and "exclusive" assemblies. His grandson John Northcote Deck helped found the South Seas Evangelical Mission in the Solomon Islands in 1904.
