= Florence Young =

New Zealand-born memoirist and missionary

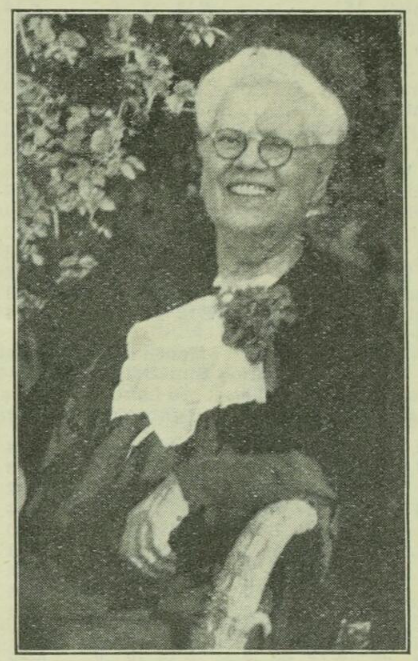
- Photograph, c. 1940
- Born: October 10, 1856; Motueka, New Zealand
- Died: May 28, 1940 (aged 83); Killara, New South Wales, Australia

Florence Selina Harriet Young (10 October 1856 – 28 May 1940) was a New Zealand-born missionary who established the Queensland Kanaka Mission in order to convert Kanaka labourers in Queensland, Australia. In addition, she conducted missionary work in China and the Solomon Islands.

== Life ==
Young was born in Motueka, South Island, New Zealand, the fifth child of an English farmer. Her parents were both Plymouth Brethren. She was educated at home in addition to two years in a boarding school in England.

She moved to Sydney, Australia in 1878, and in 1882 to Fairymead, a sugar plantation near Bundaberg, Queensland owned by her brothers Arthur, Horace, and Ernest Young. She started holding prayer meetings for the families of the planters, which became the Young People's Scriptural Union. Eventually the group attracted 4000 members. Increasingly, she focussed on the kanakas, whose "heathen" customs she detested. She began conducting classes in pidgin English, using pictures and a chrysalis to illustrate the resurrection.

In 1886 she founded the Queensland Kanaka Mission (QKM) at Fairymead as an evangelical, non-denominational church. It spread to other plantations and met with considerable approval from plantation owners and officials. In 1889, Government Inspector Caulfield noted that the behaviour of some South Sea Islanders had been improved by religious instruction. Stressing "salvation before education or civilization," it aimed to prepare the imported labourers for membership in their local established churches when they returned home. At its height, in 1904–1905, the mission employed 19 paid missionaries, and 118 unpaid "native teachers," and claimed 2,150 conversions.

Between 1891 and 1900, she spent six years with the China Inland Mission. She suffered a nervous breakdown, but recognized the work as preparation for the launch of the South Seas Evangelical Mission (SSEM), established in 1904 as a branch of the QKM in response to pleas from Peter Ambuofa and other repatriated converts who solicited help establishing and teaching their own congregations. In 1904 she led groups of white missionaries to Malaita in the Solomon Islands, hoping to nurture the newly established churches of her protégés. Young's nephew Northcote Deck, a medical doctor, worked with Young as a missionary in the Solomon Islands.

Young continued to administer the organization, from Sydney and Katoomba, New South Wales, and made annual trips to the island until 1926. She wrote an autobiography, Pearls from the Pacific, which was published in London in 1925. She died in Killara, Sydney and was buried in Gore Hill Cemetery with Presbyterian forms.
