= Motueka Ward =

- Ward
- Interactive map of Motueka Ward
- Coordinates: 41.07°S 172.95°E
- Country: New Zealand
- District: Motueka Ward
- Time zone: UTC+12 (NZST)
  - Summer (DST): UTC+13 (NZDT)

Motueka Ward is a ward of Tasman District in the north of the South Island of New Zealand.
