= Richmond Ward =

- Ward
- Interactive map of Richmond Ward
- Coordinates: 41°20′S 173°11′E
- Country: New Zealand
- District: Tasman District
- Time zone: UTC+12 (NZST)
  - Summer (DST): UTC+13 (NZDT)

Richmond Ward is a ward of Tasman District in the north of the South Island of New Zealand.
