= South Seas Evangelical Church =

The South Sea Evangelical Church (SSEC) is an evangelical, Pentecostal church in Solomon Islands. In total, 17% of the population of Solomon Islands adheres to the church, making it the third most common religious affiliation in the country behind the Anglican Church of Melanesia and the Roman Catholic Church. The SSEC is particularly popular on Malaita, the most populous island, where 47% of its members live; there are also smaller populations in Honiara and elsewhere on Guadalcanal, on Makira, and in other provinces.

== History ==
The organisation was founded at Bundaberg in 1882 and reorganised in 1886 as the "Queensland Kanaka Mission" (QKM) in Queensland, Australia, as an evangelical and non-denominational church targeting Kanakas (blackbirded labourers at the sugarcane plantations, mostly from Solomon Islands and Vanuatu). Florence Young, the sister of Arthur, Horace and Ernest Young, the owners of the Fairymead plantation on which the mission was located, was largely responsible for the establishment of the mission, and served as secretary of the organisation. At its height in 1904–05, it employed 19 missionaries, 118 unpaid "native teachers," and celebrated 2150 conversions. Young used pidgin English and illustrations to explain the resurrection and other Christian ideas.

The South Seas Evangelical Mission (SSEM) was established in 1904 by Young as a branch of the Queensland Kanaka Mission. Its purpose was to follow the workers back to their homeland, and maintain their religious instruction there. At that time fewer workers were coming, due to the White Australia policy. Florence Young continued to administer the organisation, from Sydney and Katoomba, and made annual trips to the island until 1926. Young's nephew Northcote Deck worked for the mission in the Solomons from 1909 until the late 1920s. Between 1906 and 1920, the SSEM established small enclaves on the coast of islands. On Malaita, these enclaves were always under threat from the more powerful bush groups. The first missionary in the Kwaio territory, for instance, was killed, ostensibly to purify a curse, but more because of the perceived threat to their power. Under pressure from the administration of the British Solomon Islands Protectorate, the Mission re-evaluated its linguistic policy, and in the 1920s began to use English as the medium of instruction instead of pidgins or local languages; however, to facilitate understanding, they devised a simplified English. The SSEM was criticised for using its religious influence to support the Malayta Company, which was led by the Young family in Queensland, and maintained close connections with the mission.

After World War II, the experience of many Solomon Islanders that not all whites are strict Christians made some upset that the SSEM withheld what they saw as the real key to power, education beyond literacy. Some whites were then ejected from churches as Malaita Bible teachers participated in the Maasina Rule movement. The South Seas Evangelical Church was established in 1964 under its current name, and became independent from the mission in 1975.

== Beliefs and practices ==
The SSEC is strict with regard to behaviour of its members, who are not permitted to drink alcohol, chew betel nuts or smoke. Both men and women are active in all aspects of the church's activities. The SSEC discourages performance of traditional forms of music, such as ꞋAreꞌare panpipe ensembles, because they are seen as related to the traditional ancestor worship, the spirits of which are considered "devils."

In Solomon Islands there are a number of schools sponsored by the SSEC, which, like other religious schools in Solomon Islands, receive subsidies from the government. In their missionary work, they have used a few Europeans, but they primarily train natives as Bible teachers, and arrange to have them teach their home community.

The SSEM publishes the work Not in Vain (originally, in the days of the QKM, Not in Vain: What God hath wrought amongst the Kanakas in Queensland), which includes annual reports, financial statements, and SSEM Letters.
