= List of missionaries to the South Pacific =

List of religious figures

Following is a list of notable Christian missionaries to the South Pacific islands, organized by protestants, restorationists, and Roman Catholics. Historically called the South Seas or Oceania, the South Pacific is a geographic region consisting of the portion of the Pacific Ocean located south of the equator. Countries in the South Pacific include Australia, the Cook Islands, the Federated States of Micronesia, Fiji, Kiribati, the Marshall Islands, Nauru, New Zealand, Niue, Palau, Papua New Guinea, Samoa, the Solomon Islands, Tonga, Tuvalu, and Vanuatu. The region also include French Polynesia, consisting of Gambier Islands, the Marquesas Islands, the Society Islands, Tuamotu Archipelago, Tahiti, and the Tubuai Islands.

== Protestant ==
- Cecil Abel (1903–1994), from and to Papua New Guinea
- Charles Abel (1863–1930), from England to Papua New Guinea
- Friedrich Wilhelm Albrecht (1894–1984), from Poland to Australia
- Peter Ambuofa, from Australia to Malaita
- Joseph Annand (1844–1932), from Canada to New Hebrides (now Vanuatu)
- Clarissa Chapman Armstrong (1805–1891), from the United States to the Marquesas Islands
- Francis Armstrong (1813–1897), from Scotland to Australia
- Richard Armstrong (1805–1860), from the United States to the Marquesas Islands
- Benjamin Yate Ashwell (1810–1883), from England to New Zealand
- James Backhouse (1794–1869), from England to Australia
- Emilia Baeyertz (1842–1826), from Wales to Australia and New Zealand
- Aminio Baledrokadroka (died 1926), from Fiji to Papua New Guinea
- Charles Baker (1803–1875), from England to New Zealand
- Shirley Waldemar Baker (1836–1903), from England to Australia and Tonga
- Thomas Baker (1832–1867), from England to Fiji
- William Bambridge (1820–1879), from England to New Zealand
- Charles Barff (1791–1866), from England to Huahine
- Helen Hugo Barrett (1921–2019), from England to the Solomon Islands
- George Bennet (1774–1841), from England to Tahiti
- Richard Berry (1824–1908), from England to Australia
- Henry Bicknell (1766–1820), from England to Tahiti and Moorea (Society Islands)
- Hiram Bingham II (1831–1908), from the United States to the Gilbert Islands (Kiribati)
- William Binnington Boyce (1804–1889), from England to Australia
- Alfred Brown (1803–1884), from England to New Zealand
- George Brown (1835–1917), from England to Samoa
- Thomas Buddle (1812–1883), from England to New Zealand
- Joeli Bulu (c. 1810–1877), from Tonga to Fiji
- John Burden (1862–1942), from the United States to Australia
- John Gare Butler (1781–1841), from England to New Zealand
- Edwin Butz (1864-1956), from the United States to Pitcairn Island, Tonga, and Australia
- Aaron Buzacott (1800–1864), from England to Rarotonga
- James Calvert (1813–1892), from England to Fiji
- Gething Caulton (1895–1976), from England to New Zealand
- James Chalmers (1841–1901), from Scotland to New Hebrides (now Vanuatu) and New Guinea
- Anne Chapman (1791–1855), from England to New Zealand
- Percy Chatterton (1898–1984), from England to Papua New Guinean
- George Clarke (1798–1875), from England to New Zealand
- Robert Henry Codrington (1830–1922), from England to Norfolk Island
- Elizabeth Fairburn Colenso (1821–1904), from England to New Zealand
- William Colenso (1811–1899), from England to New Zealand
- E. E. V. Collocott (1886–1970), from the United States to Tonga
- Richard Blundell Comins (1848–1919), from England to Emae (Vanuatu), San Cristobal (Solomon Islands), and Siota (Solomon Islands)
- Elizabeth Colenso (1821–1904), from and to New Zealand
- William Cooper (1835–1909), from Ireland to Australia and New Zealand
- Joseph Copeland (1866–1876), from Scotland to Tanna, Aneityum, Futuna (Vanuatu)
- James Cosh (1838–1900), from Scotland to Vanuatu
- William Cotton (1813–1879), from England to New Zealand
- William Pascoe Crook (1775–1846), from England to Australia, the Marquesas Islands, and Tahiti
- Thomas Cullwick (1862–1948), from England to Banks Island (Vanuatu), Norfolk Island, and New Zealand
- Harry Moore Dauncey (1863–1932), from England to Papua New Guinea
- John Davies (1772–1855), from England to Tahiti
- Ralph De Voil (1903–1977), from England to Melanesia and Australia
- John Northcote Deck (1875–1957), from Australia to the Solomon Islands
- Norman Cathcart Deck (1882 – 1980), from Australia to the Solomon Islands
- Philip Delaporte (c. 1868–1928), from the United States to Nauru
- Edward Doane (1820–1890), from the United States to Pohnpei (Federated States of Micronesia) and Ebon Atoll (Marshall Islands)
- Alexander Don (1857–1934), from Australia to New Zealand
- William Ewart Donnelly (1900–1975), from New Zealand to Fiji
- Wilfrid Douglas (1917–2004), from and to Australia
- Hannah Dudley (1862–1931), from Australia to Fiji
- James Duncan (1813–1907), from Scotland to New Zealand
- John Samuel Edmonds (1799–1865), from England to New Zealand
- Christopher Eipper (1813–1894), from Germany to Australia
- James Elder (1772–1836), from England to Tahiti
- Elekana, from Manihiki to Tuvalu
- William Ellis (1794–1872), from England to Tahiti and Madagascar
- William Thomas Fairburn (1795–1859), from England to New Zealand
- Constance Fairhall (1906–1993), from England to Papua New Guinea
- Henry Fletcher (1868–1933), from England to New Zealand
- Johann Flierl (1858–1947), from Kingdom of Bavaria to New Guinea
- Charles Fox (1878–1977), from England to the Solomon Islands
- Laura Francis (1865–1946), from and to Australia
- John Gale (1831–1929), from England to Australia
- John Geddie (1815–1872), from Canada to Vanuatu
- William Wyatt Gill (1828–1896), from England to Australia, and Rarotongaco and Mangaia (Cook Islands)
- Louis Giustiniani, from England to Australia
- Richard Godfrey, from New Zealand to Pentecost (Vanuatu) and the Solomon Islands
- John Francis Goldie (1870–1955), from Australia to the New Georgia Islands (Solomon Islands)
- George N. Gordon (1822–1861), from Canada to New Hebrides (now Vanuatu)
- James Gordon (1832–1872), from Canada to New Hebrides (now Vanuatu)
- Thomas Grace (1815–1879), from England to New Zealand
- Ernest Gribble (1868–1957), from and to Australia
- Harry Griffiths (1895–1987), from England to Australia
- Luther Halsey Gulick Sr. (1828–1891), from the United States to Ebon Atoll (Marshall Islands)
- Octavius Hadfield (1814–1904), from England to New Zealand
- Friedrich Hagenauer (1829–1909), from the Kingdom of Saxony to Australia
- William Hall (1778–1844), from England to New Zealand
- David Hand (1918–2006), from England to Papua New Guinea
- Johann Christian Simon Handt (1794–1863), from Germany to New Zealand
- Stephen N. Haskell (1833–1922), from the United States to Australia
- Carl Heine (1870–1944), from Australia to the Marshall Islands
- Annie Henry (1879–1971), from and to New Zealand
- William Henry (1770–1859), from England to Tahiti
- Hermann Herlitz (1834–1920), from Prussia to Australia
- Edward Hilliard (1851–1936), from the United States to Australia and Tonga
- John Hobbs (1800–1883), from England to New Zealand
- Arthur Hopkins (1869–1943), from England to Malaita (Solomon Islands)
- Matthew Hunkin (1815–1888), from England to Samoa and Niue
- John Hunt (1812–1848), from England to Fiji
- John Inglis (1808–1891), from Scotland to New Hebrides (Vanuatu)
- Samuel Ironside (1814–1897), from England to New Zealand
- John Jefferson (1760–1807), from England to Tahiti
- Neville Johnson (died 2019), from England to Australia
- Sarah Jolliffe, from England to Tuvalu
- Edmund Kalau (1928–2014), from Germany to Guam
- Rēnata Kawepō (died 1888), from and to New Zealand
- James Kekela (1824–1904), from Hawaiian Kingdom to Marquesas Islands
- Merritt Kellogg (1832–1921), from the United States to Tahiti, Huahine, and Raʻiātea (Society Islands)
- Charlotte Kemp (1790–1860), from England to New Zealand
- Hermann Kempe (1844–1928), from Germany to Australia
- James Kemp (1797–1872), from England to New Zealand
- Thomas Kendall (1778–1832), from England to New Zealand
- Christian Keyser (1877–1961), from the Kingdom of Bavaria to New Guinea
- John King (1787–1854), from England to New Zealand
- Margaret Kissling (1808–1891), from England to New Zealand
- Ini Kopuria (died 1945), from and to Solomon Islands
- Daniel H. Kress (1862–1956), from Canada to Australia
- Lauretta Eby Kress (1863–1955), from the United States to Australia
- Lazarus Lamilami (c. 1908–1977), from and to Australia
- A. K. Langridge (1857–1938), from the United States to New Hebrides (Vanuatu)
- John Laughton (1891–1965), from Scotland to New Zealand
- William George Lawes (1839–1907), from England to Papua New Guinea
- Mary Cover Lawry (1799–1825), from Australia to Tonga
- Annie Lock (1876–1943), from and to Australia
- Daniel Macdonald (1846–1927), from Scotland to Australia
- Walter MacDougall (1907–1976), from and to Australia
- John W. Mackenzie (1845–1914), from Canada to New Hebrides (Vanuatu).
- William MacKenzie (1897–1972), from New Hebrides (Vanuatu) to Australia
- Joel Hulu Mahoe (1831–1891), from Hawaiin Kingdom to Gilbert Islands (Kiribati)
- John Manton (1807–1864), from England to Australia
- Samuel Marsden (1765–1838), from England to Australia
- Josua Mateinaniu, to and from Fiji
- James Mathers (1854–1911), from Ireland to Australia
- Robert Maunsell (1810–1894) from Ireland to New Zealand
- Oscar Michelsen (1844–1936), from Norway to Vanuatu
- J. Graham Miller (1913–2008), from New Zealand and Australia to New Hebrides (Vanuatu)
- Peter Milne (1834–1924), from Scotland to New Hebrides (Vanuatu)
- William Mitchell (1803–1870), from Ireland to Australia
- John Morgan (1812–1865), from England to New Zealand
- Donald Morrison (1828–1869), from Canada to New Hebrides (Vanuatu)
- Rupert Mounsey (1867–1952), from England to New Guinea
- Sioeli Nau (1825–1895) from Tonga to Fiji
- Sailasa Naucukidi, from Fiji to Papua New Guinea
- Mehetabel Newman (1822–1908), from England to New Zealand
- George Hunn Nobbs (1799–1884), from England to Pitcairn Island and Norfolk Island (Australia)
- James Noble (died 1941), from and to Australia
- Henry Nott (1774–1844), from England to Tahiti and Moorea (French Polynesia)
- Hugh Otter-Barry (1887–1971), from England to Australia
- Rodger Page (1878–1965), from Australia to Tonga
- John Palmer (1837–1902), from England to New Zealand
- Papeiha (died 1967), from Bora Bora to Aitutaki and Rarotonga (Cook Islands)
- Hone Tana Papahia (1856–1912), from and to New Zealand
- Frank H. L. Paton (1870–1938), from Aniwa (Vanuatu) to Australia
- John Gibson Paton (1824–1907), from Scotland to New Hebrides (Vanuatu)
- Margaret Paton (1841–1905), from England to New Hebrides (Vanuatu)
- John Patteson (1827–1871), from England to New Zealand
- Nukai Peniamina, from and to Niue
- Nathaniel Pidgeon (1803–1879), from Ireland to Australia
- George Platt (1789–1865), from England to French Polynesia (Moorea, Bora Bora, Raiatea) and Samoa
- James Pollitt (1813–1881), from England to Australia
- Te Manihera Poutama (died 1847), from and to New Zealand
- Thomas Powell (1809–1887), from England to Samoa
- George Pratt (1817–1894), from England to Samoa
- George Pritchard (1796–1883), from England to the Society Islands
- William Gilbert Puckey (1805–1878), from England to New Zealand
- Arthur Purchas (1821–1906), from Wales to New Zealand
- Evelyn Ramsey (1923–1989), from the United States to Papua New Guinea
- Minarapa Rangihatuake (died 1893), from and to New Zealand
- Susannah Jane Rankin (1897–1989), from Wales to Papua New Guinea
- Don Richardson (1935–2018), from Canada to Netherlands New Guinea
- William Ridley (1819–1878), from England to Australia
- Darlene Rose (died 2004), from the United States to New Guinea
- Ruatoka (1846–1903), from the Cook Islands to British New Guinea
- Mary Anne Rymill (1817–1897), from England to New Zealand
- Edward Sayers (1902–1985), from New Zealand to the Solomon Islands
- Isobel Schenk (1898–1980), from and to Australia
- Rodolphe Samuel Schenk (1888–1969), from and to Australia
- Carl Wilhelm Schmidt (died 1864), from Germany to Australia and Samoa
- Clamor Wilhelm Schürmann (1815–1893), from Germany to Australia
- George Selwyn (1809–1878), from England to New Zealand
- Sarah Selwyn (1809–1907), from England to New Zealand
- James Shepherd (1796–1882), from Australia to New Zealand
- Elsie Smith (1881–1968), from England to New Zealand
- John Smithies (1802–1872), from England to Australia
- Alexander Neil Somerville (1813–1889), from Scotland to Australia and New Zealand
- Seymour Mills Spencer (1812–1898), from the United States to New Zealand
- James Stack (1801–1883), from England to New Zealand
- James West Stack (1835–1919), from and to New Zealand
- Carl Strehlow (1871–1922), from Germany to Australia
- Hilmer Swanson (1932–2005), from the United States to Palau
- Rawiri Taiwhanga (1818–1874), from and to New Zealand
- George Taplin (1831–1879), from England to Australia
- Henare Wiremu Taratoa (1830–1864), from and to New Zealand
- John Tay (1832–1892), from the United States to Pitcairn Island (British Overseas Territories)
- Richard Taylor (1805–1873), from England to New Zealand
- Hēnare Mātene Te Whiwhi (died 1881), from and to New Zealand
- Alfred Teall, from England to Ambae (Vanuatu) and Banks Island (Vanuatu)
- Christian Gottlieb Teichelmann (1807–1888), from Kingdom of Prussia to Australia
- Lancelot Edward Threlkeld (1788–1859), from England to Tahiti and Australia
- Alan Tippett (1911–1988), from Australia to Fiji
- Oliver Fellows Tomkins (1873–1901), from England to Papua New Guinea
- George Turner (1818–1891), from England to Samoa
- Nathaniel Turner (1793–1864), from England to New Zealand, Australia, and Tonga
- David Unaipon (1872–1967), from and to Australia
- Ilaijia Varani, from and to Fiji
- Carl Sylvius Völkner (c. 1819–1865), from Germany to New Zealand
- Daniel Vrooman (1818–1895), from the United States to Australia
- Douglas Walkden-Brown (1921–2013), from Australia to Fiji
- George Washington Walker (1800–1859), from England to Australia
- James Wallis ( 1809–1895), from England to New Zealand
- Mary Wallis (1802– 1893), from England to New Zealand
- Gregory Warner (born c.1780), from England to Tahiti
- Joseph Waterhouse (1828–1881), from England to Fiji
- William Watt (1843–1926), from Scotland to the New Hebrides (Vanuatu)
- Daniel Wheeler (1771–1840), from England to Australia, Tahiti, the Sandwich Islands
- William White (1794–1875), from England to New Zealand
- John Whiteley (1806–1869), from England to New Zealand
- Henry Williams (1792–1867), from England to New Zealand
- Jane Williams (1801–1896), from England to New Zealand
- Marianne Williams (1793–1879) from England to New Zealand
- Samuel Williams (1822–1907), from England to New Zealand
- Thomas Williams (1815–1891), from Australia to Fiji
- William Williams (1800–1878), from England to New Zealand
- Charles Wilson (1770–1857), from England to Tahiti
- John Alexander Wilson (1809–1887), from England to New Zealand
- Eliza Wohlers, (1812–1891), from England to New Zealand
- Johan Wohlers (1811–1885), from Germany to New Zealand
- William Yate (1802–1877), from England to New Zealand
- John Youl (1773–1827), from England to Tahiti and Tasmania (Australia)
- Florence Young (1856–1940), from New Zealand to the Solomon Islands
- Johann Leopold Zillmann (1813–1892), from Germany to Australia

== Restorationist ==
- Carl Christian Amussen (1825–1902), from the United States to New Zealand
- William Barratt (1823–1889), from England to Australia
- Milton Bennion (1870–1953), from the United States to New Zealand
- Shawn Bradley (born 1972), from the United States to Australia
- H. David Burton (born 1938), from the United States to Australia
- William Henry Chamberlin (1870–1921), from the United States to the Society Islands
- Brady Christensen (born 1996), from the United States to New Zealand
- Matthew Cowley (1897–1953), from the United States to New Zealand
- Paul Alan Cox (born 1953), from the United States to Samoa
- Greg Curtis (born 1960), from the United States to New Zealand
- Loren C. Dunn (1930–2001), from the United States to Australia
- Augustus Farnham (1805–1865), from the United States to Australia and New Zealand
- Burton K. Farnsworth (1890–1945), from the United States to Samoa
- Mark Hill Forscutt (1834–1903), from the United States to Samoa
- Jack N. Gerard (born 1957), from the United States to Australia
- Greg Grant (born 1960), from the United States to Australia
- Doyle L. Green (1915–1975), from the United States to Tahiti
- John H. Groberg (born 1934), from the United States to Tonga
- Benjamin Franklin Grouard (1819–1894), from the United States to the Society Islands
- O. Vincent Haleck (born 1949), from the United States to Samoa
- Rufus K. Hardy (1879–1945), from the United States to New Zealand
- Taysom Hill (born 1990), from the United States to Australia
- Paula Houston (born 1960), from the United States to New Zealand
- James Judd (1884–1961), from the United States to Australia
- Bronson Kaufusi (born 1991), from the United States to New Zealand
- Francis W. Kirkham (1877–1972), from the United States to New Zealand
- John R. Lasater (1931–2017), from the United States to New Zealand
- Daniel H. Ludlow (1924–2009), from the United States to Australia
- Millard F. Malin (1891–1974), from the United States to New Zealand
- Robert Manookin (1918–1997), from the United States to New Zealand
- Hyrum Manwaring (1877–1956), from the United States to Tasmania (Australia)
- Rex Maughan (born 1936), from the United States to Samoa
- Bruce R. McConkie (1915–1985), from the United States to Australia
- David O. McKay (1873–1970), from the United States to Samoa, Tonga, and New Zealand
- Stuart Meha (1878–1963), from and in New Zealand
- Wendell B. Mendenhall (1907–1978), from the United States to New Zealand
- Louis C. Midgley (born 1931), from the United States to New Zealand
- John Murdock (1792–1871), from the United States to Australia
- Howard C. Nielson (1924–2020), from the United States to Australia
- Russell T. Osguthorpe (born 1946), from the United States to Tahiti
- Glenn L. Pace (1940–2017), from the United States to Australia
- Arnold Potter (1804–1872), from the United States to Australia
- Addison Pratt (1802–1872), from the United States to Tahiti
- Louisa Barnes Pratt (1802–1880), from the United States to Tahiti
- V. Lane Rawlins (born 1937), from the United States to Australia
- Marion G. Romney (1897–1988), from the United States to Australia
- Glen L. Rudd (1918–2016), from the United States to New Zealand
- Robert E. Sackley (1922–1993), from Canada to Australia
- Eric B. Shumway (born 1939), from the United States to Tonga
- Robert L. Simpson (1915–2003), from the United States to New Zealand
- Gordon H. Smith (born 1952), from the United States to New Zealand
- Brigham Smoot (1869–1946), from the United States to Tonga
- Zerubbabel Snow (1809–1888), from the United States to Australia
- Usaia Sotutu (born 1947), from and to Fiji
- Simon Southerton, from and to Australia
- Trent Staggs (born 1974), from the United States and to Tahiti
- Richard H. Stallings (1940–2025), from the United States to New Zealand
- Thomas C. Stanford (1865–1946), from the United States to New Zealand
- Jim Usevitch (born 1964), from the United States to New Zealand
- Talite Vaioleti (born 1980), from Tonga to Australia
- Devaughn Vele (born 1997), from the United States to Samoa
- Peter Vidmar (born 1961), from the United States to Australia
- Osborne J. P. Widtsoe (1877–1920), from the United States to Rarotonga (Cook Islands)
- John Williams (1796–1839), from England to Tahiti and Samoa
- Edward J. Wood (1866–1956), from Canada to Samoa
- Robert D. Young (1867–1962), from the United States to Australia

== Roman Catholic ==
- Suzanne Aubert (1835– 1926), from France to New Zealand
- Ottavio Barsanti (1825–1884), from Italy to New Zealand
- Joseph Dalton (1817–1905), from Ireland to New Zealand and Australia
- Joseph Marie Garavel (1824–1885), from France to New Zealand
- Antoine Garin (1810–1889), from France to New Zealand
- Jean Lampila (1808–1897), from France to New Zealand
- Adrian Langerwerf (1876–1935), from The Netherlands to New Zealand
- James McDonald (1824–1890), from Ireland to New Zealand
- Jean Étienne Pezant (1811–1880), from France to New Zealand
- Jean-Baptiste Pompallier (1801–1871), from France to New Zealand
- John Rodgers (1915–1997), from and to New Zealand
- Emmanuel Rougier (1864–1932), from France to Fiji
- Louis Catherin Servant (1808–1860), from France to New Zealand

== See also ==
- Bible translations into Oceanic languages
- First missionaries in Polynesia
- List of Catholic missionaries
- List of Catholic missionaries to China
- List of Catholic missionaries in India
- List of Catholic missions in Africa
- List of Christian missionaries
- List of Eastern Orthodox missionaries
- List of missionaries to Hawaii
- List of Mormon missionary diarists (Pacific)
- List of Protestant missionaries in China
- List of Protestant missionaries in India
- List of Protestant missionaries to Southeast Asia
- List of Slovenian missionaries
- Timeline of Christian missions
