= Charles Wilson (missionary) =

English missionary

Charles Wilson (1770–1857) was a British missionary associated with the London Missionary Society (LMS) who served in the South Pacific during the late 18th and early 19th centuries. Born around 1770 in Tough, Scotland, Rev. Charles Wilson dedicated 56 years to missionary work, spending 40 of those years in the Society Islands. His unwavering faith and perseverance in the face of personal loss and hardship left a lasting impact on the region's Christian community. Orphaned early and tested by hardship, he developed a deep faith through his godly mother. His trials led him to missionary service, where he made a lasting impact. In 1798, Wilson began his missionary journey on the Duff, enduring hardship, including the ship's capture. Undeterred, he reached Tahiti in 1801, becoming one of the first to spread the gospel. Throughout his ministry, he showed perseverance, teaching, guiding converts, and taking on manual labor despite many challenges. Wilson remained devoted to his calling despite personal tragedies, including the loss of both his wives and children. His unwavering faith contributed to the growth of churches across the islands. He retired in 1842 and spent his final years in Samoa, where he died in 1855 at age 85. His legacy endures as a testament to a life dedicated to God and service.

== Early life ==
Charles Wilson was Born in Tough, Scotland, in 1770. He lost his father in infancy, and was raised by his mother, who is remembered as a devout and godly woman. From an early age, she instilled in him the truths of religion. He spent some time attending the school in his native parish, but around the age of fourteen, he was sent to Aberdeen to apprentice as a baker. Not long after this move, his mother died. Despite this early loss, he found care and guidance under the providence of "the Father of the fatherless." After completing his training and gaining experience in the baking trade, he moved to London, where he became part of the ministry of Dr. Waugh and other prominent religious figures. When Wilson began to consider a future in missionary work, his employer urged him to remain in the baking business, even promising to soon hand over the business to him.

== Missionary calling. Second voyage of the Duff ==
When the Directors of the London Missionary Society were seeking agents for the second voyage of the Duff, Wilson offered his services for the South Sea Mission. His application was accepted. He was among the missionaries who embarked on December 19, 1798, aboard the Duff, commanded by Captain Thomas Robson and bound for the South Sea Islands. However, the ship would never reach its destination.

The Duff was captured off Cape Frio on February 19, 1799. As the ship approached Rio de Janeiro, it was seized by the French privateer Le Grand Buonaparte, commanded by Captain A. Carbonelle. The men were transferred to the Buonaparte, while their wives, children, and the surgeon remained on the Duff, which was now under captain Rivière. Having in less than a fortnight taken three other prizes, all of them Portuguese brigs, captain Carbonelle decided to sail for Montevideo in the Rio de la Plata. The Buonaparte reached its destination on March 12, 1799. On their arrival, the missionaries had the happiness to learn that the Duff had reached Montevideo several days before them. A Spanish officer told Captain Carbonelle that the governor had prohibited him from selling his prizes or disembarking his prisoners. He added that a specific departure time would be allowed, after which he must leave the port with everything in his possession. While in South America, the missionaries were not held as prisoners of war and were allowed to move freely without threat or restriction. As of March 30, they were all settled comfortably in one house. Captain Carbonelle and his officers not only continued to show them great kindness, but even the Spaniards, for the most part, treated them with the highest courtesy.

After staying in Montevideo for more than six weeks, the missionaries were required to leave in compliance with the governor's orders. On May 7, 1799, they embarked aboard a small Portuguese brig the Postilion which was a prize of Captain Carbonelle and set sail for Rio de Janeiro. However, the brig was captured on June 5, by a Portuguese frigate of forty-six-guns, which was part of a fleet, before reaching its destination. The captain had purchased the brig that was transporting the missionaries without it having been formally condemned as a prize of war, and having also committed certain illicit acts of smuggling, his vessel was then seized by his own countrymen. The missionaries, having been captured a second time, were ordered to disembark from the brig and were transferred either to the commodore's ship, the Medusa, a seventy-four-gun vessel, or to the Amazona, the forty-six-gun frigate, both serving as escorts for the fleet bound for Lisbon.

The English missionaries were set at liberty on their arrival in Lisbon on September 21. They quickly secured passage to England, departing from Lisbon on October 4, aboard two ships, the Prince of Wales and the Fortitude. Most of them arrived in England on October 13, 1799, after nearly ten months of absence.

== Charles Wilson's perseverance: A second journey to the South Seas ==
Among the 39 candidates who had originally set out aboard the Duff on December 20, 1798, only Charles Wilson, James Hayward, William Waters, John Youl, and James Mitchell volunteered once again to travel to Tahiti. They boarded the Royal Admiral, commanded by Captain William Wilson, which was transporting 300 convicts to the penal colony of Sydney. Seven other young men had been recruited: James Elder, William Scott, James Shepherd, William Read, Stephen Morris, Samuel Teissier, and John Davies.

They set sail from Spithead in May 1800, making their way to Rio de Janeiro as part of their voyage to the South Seas. After a long voyage with several stopovers, they arrived in Tahiti on July 10, 1801.

James Shepherd, unable to cope with seasickness, disembarked at Portsea. Stephen Morris died in New South Wales as a result of an epidemic that had broken out shortly after the ship's departure. James Mitchell, during his stay in New South Wales, decided to enter the service of a Sydney merchant. As for William Read, his companions eventually convinced Captain Wilson to re-embark him, as he was deemed incompatible with the rest of the group for collaborative work. He continued to work for the LMS on the island of Ceylon.

A group of eleven missionaries had already set sail aboard the Nautilus for Port Jackson on March 30, 1798, and after a six-week voyage, they had reached their destination.

== Fly of the missionaries to Moorea and Huahine ==
Wilson worked as a missionary in Matavai (Mahina), Tahiti, for several years. However, disturbances in the district disrupted missionary activities. Following an insurrection against Pomare II in November 1808, most of the missionaries temporarily relocated to Huahine aboard the Perseverance on November 10, 1808. They were warmly welcomed by Ariipaea, his wife Itia, and Puru, Ariipaea's brother. While Charles Wilson, James Hayward, William Scott, and Henry Nott initially remained in Matavai, escalating violence compelled them to retreat to Moorea following a major battle on December 22, 1808, during which Pomare II lost sovereignty over the island of Tahiti. On April 3, 1809, Charles Wilson and William Scott joined the other missionaries in Huahine, followed later by james Hayward on July 22, 1809. During their stay on the island, missionaries John Davies, William Henry, James Elder, and Charles Wilson traveled around the island to preach the Gospel while also estimating the population at approximately 1,300 people.

== Return to the colony of New South Wales via the Fiji Islands ==
On October 17, 1809, the brig Hibernia, under Captain William Campbell, anchored in the harbor of Fare, accompanied by the Port Jackson schooner Venus, commanded by Captain John Burback. Campbell had recently succeeded in recapturing the Venus from the rebellious natives of Tahiti. Most of the missionaries, led by John Davies, departed Huahine on October 26, 1809, aboard the Hibernia, which was bound for the Fiji Islands to collect a cargo of sandalwood for the Chinese market. James Hayward and the elderly William Caw, who had already ended his association with the London Missionary Society, chose to remain behind. The only other remaining English missionary, apart from Hayward, was Henry Nott, who was in Moorea. The Hibernia sustained damage in Fiji and was brought ashore on November 20 at an islet off the Macuata coast for repairs. Several of the missionaries went ashore to prepare a hut for their residence. On November 28, 1809, Captain Chase of the Hope, who was aware of their distress, arrived and anchored near the islet. On December 4, with the assistance of the Americans, the vessel was partially hove down. The damage was found to be less severe than anticipated, and the American ship carpenter agreed to undertake the repairs. During their stay on the islet, the missionaries were supplied with provisions by the Fijians. The locals displayed a great curiosity about the missionaries' women and on several occasions, offered to buy them in exchange for sandalwood or even trade them for some of their own women. It was necessary to keep them at as much distance as possible. Without a doubt, if they had the chance, they would seize the missionaries' women and take them. On December 28, it was reported that the Fijians had devised a plan to approach the missionaries during the night, with the intention of killing them and seizing their women and property. Upon hearing of this, Captain Chase, displaying great humanity, offered to do anything in his power to assist the missionaries, stating that his ship and guns were at their disposal.

On December 30, 1809, the American carpenter had completed the repairs on the Hibernia. On January 9, 1810, all missionaries and their families boarded the Hibernia, except for Gregory Warner, the surgeon, who had secured a promise of free passage to China aboard the Hope. He intended to travel to India. They set sail in the morning On January 23, 1810, sailing at a rate of six miles an hour, they departed the Fiji Islands.

On February 17, 1810, the Hibernia anchored at Sydney Cove. The missionaries addressed a letter to Governor Macquarie, informing him of their arrival and circumstances, and requesting, as British subjects in distress, the privileges of settlers in the Colony.

== First marriage, and return to Moorea ==
Upon learning that conditions in Tahiti had improved, some missionaries returned to the island in 1811. Wilson joined them the following year, accompanied by his wife, Charlotte Burnett, whom he had married during his stay. She was a member of the Tabernacle Church in Moorfields, and had recently arrived in Sydney.

In July 1812, King Pomare II informed several missionaries of his resolute decision to renounce his false gods and former sinful ways. He sincerely expressed his desire to embrace the Christian faith as the only true religion, to acknowledge Jehovah as his God, and to accept Jesus Christ as his sole Saviour and Redeemer. He added that, if they deemed it appropriate, they could record his name as a candidate for baptism, and he asked them to pray for him.

With the promising signs of success, the missionaries were filled with renewed hope, which soon blossomed into real progress. Wilson contributed to the work at the shared mission station at Eimeo, and, along with others, took part in preaching tours around Eimeo and Tahiti.

== Unexpected journey to the Leeward Islands with Pomare II ==
On September 3, 1814, he made an unplanned visit to the Leeward Islands, having been driven there by adverse winds, aboard the brig Matilda from India, commanded by Captain Fowler. He had boarded the vessel off the harbour at Eimeo to assist in freeing her from a perilous position she had gotten into while attempting to reach the anchorage. He was accompanied by Pomare II, Taaroaarii, son of Puru, George Bicknell, nephew of Henry Bicknell, Samuel Henry, son of William Henry, and other people from Moorea. They were compelled to stay in the Leeward islands for three months. There, he preached frequently to large crowds. The missionaries were so busy spreading their religion that they overlooked two important events: the allegiance of all the chiefs of the Leeward Islands to Pomare II and Pomare II's adoption of Teri'inohorai, grandson of Tapoa I, who was betrothed to his daughter, Aimata (future Pomare IV). They were all back in Moorea on December 2, 1814.

== Relocation to Matavai Tahiti and death of his wife ==
In December 1817, Wilson relocated to Tahiti, where he served at Waugh Town (missionary station at Matavai Bay) from 1818 to 1842. His wife, with whom he had four children (two boys and two girls), died on August 12, 1818.

== Return to New South Wales' colony. Second marriage and return to Tahiti ==
In 1820, Charles Wilson went on another trip to Sydney, taking his two sons with him while leaving his daughters on the islands. There, he took a second wife and left Sydney aboard the ship Hope on March 10, 1821, in the company of his new wife and his sons, as well as James Hayward and his new wife. They arrived at Matavai Bay on April 28, 1821. It is noted that one of his sons, Samuel Wilson, was about 10 years old at the time. The translation of the Bible in Tahitian, in which he had participated alongside other missionaries, had progressed well. On December 7, 1821, he witnessed the death of Pomare II. Wilson also had to endure the harmful effects of the Mamaia or Visionary Heresy, which had spread to Tahiti and the Leeward Islands from 1826 to 1841.

== The end of an era ==
In the 1840s, the new generation of missionaries did not find the Tahitian people in the state of spiritual elevation they had expected. Charles Wilson, William Henry, and Henry Nott received a letter of appreciation from the directors of the London Missionary Society for their admirable services, along with permission for them and their families to settle in a country of their choice. This provoked the anger of John Davies, who had not been affected by this sanction, as well as the indignation of Jacques-Antoine Moerenhout. The new missionaries loudly proclaimed their supposed superiority; however, most of them did not master the Tahitian language...

== Retirement and the Franco-Tahitian War ==
After more than four decades of missionary service in the Society Islands, Wilson retired in 1842 but remained in Matavai (Māhina). The missionary community quickly disbanded amid political turmoil in 1844. Thomas McKean, James Wilson's successor, was shot and killed on June 30, 1844, in Matavai during an engagement between the French and the Tahitians.

== A peaceful end in Samoa ==
After the death of McKean, Wilson decided to move to Samoa. His second wife died on August 4, 1848, and Wilson himself died at Falealili, Upolu, Samoa, on July 3, 1857, at the age of 87.
