= John Youl (priest) =

John Youl (30 June 1773 – 25 March 1827) was an Australian Anglican priest, Congregationalist minister and landowner. Youl was the first chaplain to the northern part of modern-day Tasmania and played a foundational role in the early religious life of colonial Australia. Initially sent to Tahiti by the London Missionary Society, he later became the first chaplain to the northern settlement of Port Dalrymple. Active in ministry, education, and agricultural development, Youl was instrumental in establishing churches, schools, and pastoral enterprises, and contributed significantly to the spiritual and social structure of Tasmania during its formative years.

== Early life and missionary travels ==
John Youl was born in London on 30 June 1773, into a family with Scottish ancestry tracing back to Stirling. On 19 December 1798, he embarked on his first missionary journey to Tahiti as a lay representative of the London Missionary Society aboard the Duff.

However, the voyage was disrupted when the Duff was captured by a French Privateer on February 19, 1799. After being released and spending six weeks in Montevideo, the missionaries boarded a small Portuguese brig bound for Rio de Janeiro on May 7, 1799. En route, the brig was intercepted by a Portuguese fleet sailing to Portugal.

The English missionaries were freed upon arrival in Lisbon on September 21. They quickly arranged passage back to England, departing Lisbon on October 4, aboard the Prince of Wales and the Fortitude. Most of them returned to England on October 13, 1799, after nearly ten months abroad.

Back in London, Youl became active in domestic missionary work and helped found the London Itinerant Society.

== South Sea Islands ==
John Youl's ordination took place in May 1800 at the Congregational chapel in Portsea. He then departed for the Pacific aboard the Royal Admiral, a long-distance mail ship of the East India Company transporting approximately 300 convicts to the penal colony at Sydney. Upon arrival in Sydney, Youl was delayed for three months, during which he assisted Reverend Samuel Marsden and preached in various settlements including Toongabbie, Kissing Point, and the Hawkesbury.

John Youl reached Tahiti on July 10, 1801, accompanied by James Elder, John Davies, and other missionaries. The group operated under the protection of Pomare I and later Pomare II. Since their arrival in March 1797, the English missionaries faced considerable challenges in their efforts to convert the Tahitian population to Christianity, primarily due to their lack of proficiency in the local language. This linguistic barrier hindered the effective transmission of the evangelical message. Nevertheless, despite these impediments, the missionaries remained steadfast in their spiritual commitment.

On April 20, 1801, the English missionaries in Tahiti became aware of a conflict between Pōmare I and the inhabitants of Atehuru, a district situated on the western coast of the island. The dispute originated from the alleged theft, by individuals from Atehuru, of a sacred object from Pare: the image of the principal deity 'Oro. While tensions surrounding this event continued to shape local political dynamics, the missionaries remained focused on their evangelical efforts. Their linguistic progress soon yielded tangible results. The first missionary sermons delivered without an interpreter took place on August 16, 1801, and the first written text in a Polynesian language appeared on October 8, 1801.

In late March 1802, a major assembly was convened in Atehuru. During this gathering, Otoo (later Pōmare II), having previously demanded the return of the image of 'oro and been refused, seized the object by force. This action provoked a violent rebellion and resulted in considerable bloodshed. The idol of 'Oro was subsequently recaptured by the people of Atehuru during a night assault on Pōmare I and his son Otoo (Pomare II) in Tautira, at a time when they were engaged in traditional religious ceremonies. In response, an expedition was organized by Captain Bishop, accompanied by a contingent of twenty-four English seamen, and Pōmare I with his troops, in an effort to subdue the Atehuruans. The missionary James Elder took part in this punitive expedition in the capacity of a surgeon. The conflict eventually came to an end on July 4, 1802, following the death of Rua, the principal leader of the Atehuru faction, who had been supported by other tribes from Tahiti’s western coast. The missionaries later reflected that had it not been for what they interpreted as divine intervention, namely the unexpected arrival of Captain Bishop of the Venus and his crew on the island and the wrecking of the Norfolk commanded by Captain House near Matavai Bay, they along with Pomare I, Otoo, and their followers would likely have been expelled from Tahiti and might even have faced mortal danger.

On March 8, 1805, John Jefferson and John Davies convened a meeting to establish a standardized Tahitian alphabet, laying the groundwork for an English–Tahitian dictionary. By 1806, the dictionary contained approximately 2,000 words, primarily compiled by Henry Nott and John Davies. In October 1806, the opening of an evening school enabled Davies to transcribe a small syllabary, which was sent to London on May 3, 1807. Printed in 1812, it marked a major milestone in the modern history of Tahiti and the Pacific, as the first book ever published in an Oceanic language.

John Youl worked in Tahiti until 1807, contributing to early efforts to translate religious texts and establish Christian teachings in the Society Islands. His experience in Polynesia shaped his understanding of cross-cultural ministry and prepared him for future service in Australia. Although Youl had already departed Tahiti, by the end of 1815 the London Missionary Society's efforts culminated in the abandonment of idolatry, human sacrifice, and infanticide, and in the widespread adoption of Christianity across the Society Islands.

== Arrival in Australia and ministry in New South Wales ==
Returning to Sydney in 1807, he accepted a pastoral role at the Ebenezer church, supported by the Portland Head Society. On January 31, 1810, he married Jane Loder in Parramatta. Jane was the daughter of George Loder, a local gaoler and pound-keeper. The couple went on to have nine children—six sons and three daughters.

=== Ordination and service in Van Diemen’s Land ===
In 1813, Youl returned to England to pursue further theological study and was promised ordination by the Bishop of London. He received episcopal orders from the Bishop of Chester in 1815. Shortly afterward, Earl Bathurst appointed him as the first chaplain to Port Dalrymple in northern Van Diemen’s Land, with an annual salary of £183. After arriving in Sydney, Governor Lachlan Macquarie temporarily stationed him in Liverpool until housing was arranged for his family in Van Diemen’s Land.

=== Establishing a parish in Launceston ===
Youl visited Port Dalrymple in December 1818 to assess his new parish. During a three-week stay, he officiated 41 marriages and baptized 67 children. He and his family later traveled from Sydney to Launceston aboard the Prince Leopold, arriving in November 1819 with thirty tons of freight. Initially, services were held in a converted blacksmith’s shop on Cameron Street, with an iron drum used to summon parishioners. In July 1821, he relocated to a newly built parsonage in George Town, where he ministered to convicts, ran a school, and toured his expansive parish.

=== Land grants and pastoral legacy ===
Under Bathurst’s directive, Youl’s salary was increased to £250. He was granted 400 acres of glebe land, five assigned servants, and government livestock. Additionally, he received a personal land grant of 700 acres along the South Esk River. With breeding stock from John Macarthur’s flock, Youl helped his sons establish themselves as successful pastoralists in the region.

== Final years and death ==
In December 1824, Lieutenant-Governor George Arthur laid the foundation stone for St John’s Church of England in Launceston. Although Youl admired the interior design, he found the exterior proportions compromised due to Arthur’s edits to the architectural plans. He moved to Launceston but struggled with respiratory illness and disillusionment over local moral standards. He died of asthma on March 25, 1827, shortly after participating in the church’s consecration. His widow, Jane, lived until July 19, 1877 and died in Perth, Tasmania.

== See also ==
- Youl family
