= Thomas Stanford =

Thomas Stanford may refer to:

- Thomas Stanford (film editor) (1924–2017), Academy Award winning film editor
- Thomas Stanford (MP) for Stafford
- Thomas C. Stanford (1865–1945), legislator
- Thomas Welton Stanford (1832–1918), American-born Australian businessman, spiritualist and philanthropist

== See also ==
- Tom Stanford (1860–?), British footballer
