= Peter Milne (missionary) =

Peter Milne (17 May 1834 – 24 November 1924) was a Scottish missionary to the New Hebrides (now Vanuatu).

Milne was born in Aberdeen, and studied at the University of Aberdeen and the Free Church College. He was ordained in 1868 as a missionary under the Presbyterian Synod of Otago and Southland, and arrived in Nguna in 1870. By 1896 the entire island was (at least nominally) Christian. Milne served in the New Hebrides for more than fifty years.

Milne encouraged the production of arrowroot as a means of paying for the printing of religious books in the local language. Along with Daniel Macdonald and John W. Mackenzie, Milne translated the Old Testament into Efatese. He and Macdonald were involved in a feud that lasted for more than fifteen years, which started with a disagreement over how to translate the word "God" in the local language.
