= John W. Mackenzie =

Canadian missionary (1845–1914)

John William Mackenzie (c. 1845 – 14 October 1914) was a Presbyterian missionary from Nova Scotia to the New Hebrides (now known as Vanuatu).

Mackenzie was born in Pictou County, Nova Scotia, and studied at Dalhousie College. He served as a missionary in southern Efate from 1872 to 1912. J. P. MacPhie suggested in 1914 that "his tactfulness has meant much to the whole mission and his saintly character has exercised a unique influence upon Europeans as well as natives." According to J. Graham Miller, Mackenzie is "rightly remembered and honoured" as South Efate's "most eminent missionary".

Along with Daniel Macdonald and Peter Milne, Mackenzie translated the Old Testament into the Efatese language.

Mackenzie was the father of William MacKenzie, who served as a missionary in Aurukun, Queensland.
