= Varani (surname) =

Varani is a surname. Notable people with the surname include:

- Bruno Varani (1925–2005), Argentine basketball player
- Ilaijia Varani, Fijian chief
