= David Edmonds =

David Edmonds may refer to:

- David Edmonds (businessman) (born 1944), British businessman, civil servant and administrator
- David Edmonds (cricketer) (1907–1950), New Zealand cricketer
- David Edmonds (philosopher) (born 1964), British philosopher

== See also ==
- Dave Edmunds (born 1944), Welsh singer-songwriter, guitarist and record producer
