= Henry Bicknell (missionary) =

English missionary (1766–1820)

Henry Bicknell (1766 – 7 August 1820) was an English missionary affiliated with the London Missionary Society (LMS), notable for his evangelical and practical contributions in the Society Islands, particularly Tahiti and Mo'orea, during the early nineteenth century. Trained as a carpenter, Bicknell applied his technical expertise to support the missionary enterprise. Beyond his craftsmanship, he played an essential role in the dissemination of Christianity throughout Polynesia.

== Biography ==
Born in 1766, Bicknell felt a deep calling to missionary work and was appointed to the South Seas Mission. On August 10, 1796, he sailed with other missionaries from England aboard the Duff, commanded by Captain James Wilson, as part of the pioneering London Missionary Society mission to Polynesia. After a long voyage, he arrived in Tahiti on March 5, 1797, where he played a vital role in spreading Christianity among the islanders. As a carpenter, Bicknell also contributed practical skills to the missionary community.

He was instrumental in building the Haweis, the first vessel constructed by English missionaries in Mo'orea. Working with Henry Nott, William Scott, Charles Wilson, James Hayward, and his nephew George Bicknell, he helped transform native timber into a 70-ton brig under the patronage of King Pōmare II. Launched in December 1817, the Haweis supported missionary travel and trade across the islands, reflecting the practical skills and collaborative spirit of its builders. The Haweis completed its first voyage to Port Jackson (Sydney), arriving on 23 January 1819 bearing a commercial cargo of pork and coconut oil, thereby marking a significant milestone in missionary maritime enterprise in the South Pacific.

Bicknell left Tahiti for Port Jackson (Sydney) on May 29, 1808, and returned to England in 1809, where he married Mary Ann Bradley. In 1810, he returned to Tahiti, later moving to Moorea before settling at the Matavai Bay mission station. At the end of 1815, he bore witness to the renunciation of idolatry, the cessation of infanticide and human sacrifice, and the progressive establishment of Christianity throughout the Society Islands. In 1818, he settled in Papara, Tahiti, where he pursued his missionary endeavors until his death from dysentery on 7 August 1820. He was buried in Mo'orea and survived by three sons and two daughters.

After his death, his widow, Mary Ann Bicknell, later married John Davies, another influential missionary in the Pacific.
