= Oscar A. Kirkham =

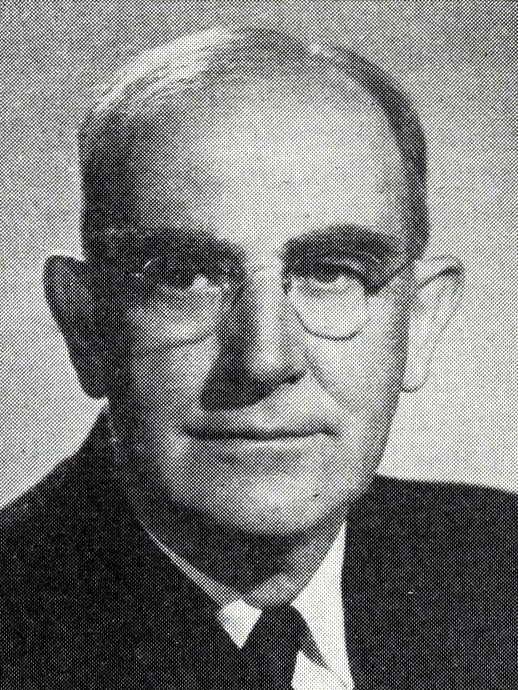

First Council of the Seventy
- October 5, 1941 – March 10, 1958
- Called by: Heber J. Grant

Personal details
- Born: Oscar Ammon Kirkham; January 22, 1880; Lehi, Utah Territory, United States
- Died: March 10, 1958 (aged 78); Salt Lake City, Utah, United States

Oscar Ammon Kirkham (January 22, 1880 – March 10, 1958) was a general authority in the Church of Jesus Christ of Latter-day Saints (LDS Church) and one of the seven presidents of Seventy.

== Biography ==
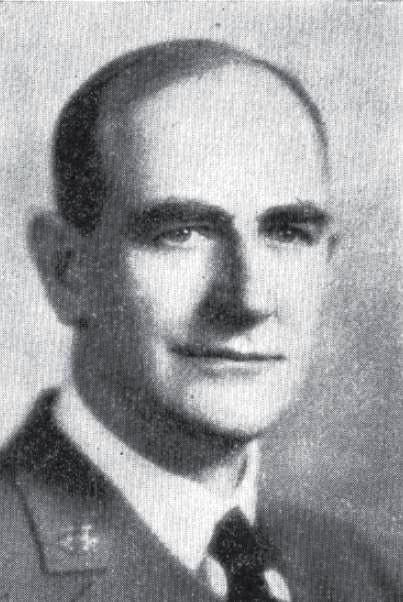
Kirkham ca. 1936

Kirkham was born in Lehi, Utah Territory, to James Kirkham and his wife, Mary Mercer. Oscar Kirkham was the younger brother of prominent educator and Book of Mormon defender Francis W. Kirkham. Kirkham was ordained a seventy by Joseph W. McMurrin on February 26, 1905. After serving as a missionary for The Church of Jesus Christ of Latter-day Saints in Germany and graduating from Brigham Young Academy, Kirkham studied music in Germany and then taught at the Latter-day Saints University.

In 1913 Kirkham was appointed the traveling secretary of the LDS Church's Young Men's Mutual Improvement Association (YMMIA) to oversee recreational activities. He later served for many years as the executive secretary of the YMMIA. Kirkham was involved with Scouting at a high level, serving as a regional scout executive and on the U.S. national staff at the 1929 International Jamboree at Arrowe Park in Birkenhead, England, where he was in charge of the religious exercises of the American scouts.

Heber J. Grant installed Kirkham as one of the seven presidents of the Seventy on October 5, 1941. Marion D. Hanks had Kirkham's personal notes published as a book, Say the Good Word, to which Hanks wrote the foreword.

After having taught music at Ricks Academy early in his career, Kirkham was later honored with a building named after him on the campus of Ricks College.
