= Stephen N. Haskell =

American missionary (1833–1922)

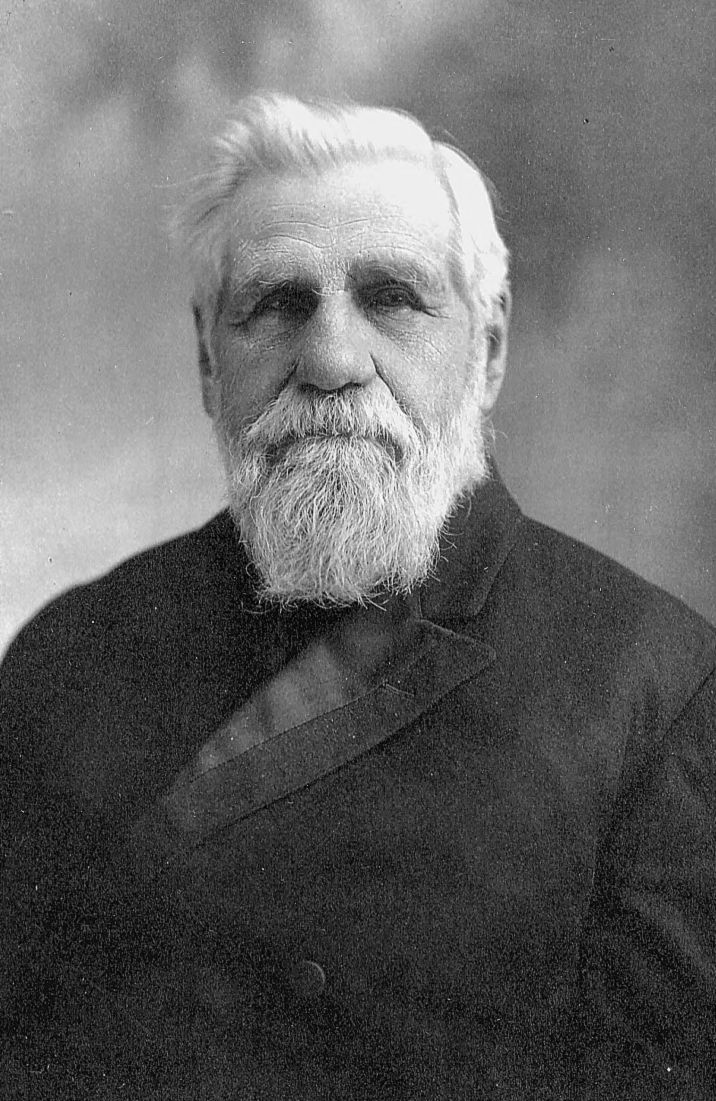
- Born: April 22, 1833; Oakham, Massachusetts
- Died: 1922 (aged 88–89); National City, California
- Occupations: Evangelist, missionary and editor in the Seventh-day Adventist Church
- Known for: One of the pioneers of the Seventh-day Adventist Church in the South Pacific

Stephen Nelson Haskell (April 22, 1833 – October 9, 1922) was an evangelist, missionary and editor in the Seventh-day Adventist Church who became one of the pioneers of the Seventh-day Adventist Church in the South Pacific.

== Personal life ==
He was born in Oakham, Massachusetts on April 22, 1833. He was converted to Christianity at the age of 15 when he joined the Congregational church. When he was 17 years old, while working on a farm, the owner on his deathbed, asked him before he died to take care of his 38-year-old sister who was paraplegic due to illness. After thinking about this, he accepted and he thought that the best way to look after her was marrying her. By this time, he and Mary were Methodists.

A couple of years later, Mary Haskell's health improved and was able to walk again. He had been married for two years when he heard about the imminent second coming of Jesus according to Millerite preachings and soon embraced this hope. Haskell started telling everyone about the Adventist message and a friend invited him to preach. As a soap manufacturer and dealer, he had to travel a lot, which gave him the chance of meeting people and making new friends wherever he went.

After the death of Mary Haskell in 1894 at the age of 81, Stephen spent the next five years as a missionary in Africa and Australia. Intensely lonely and often depressed after Mary's death, he drew much encouragement from the letters of Ellen White. He received more letters from her than any other person outside her immediate family. Eventually he proposed marriage to her [as she was widowed] but she declined, suggesting instead that Hetty Hurd would make a good companion for him.

== Involvement in the church ==
While president of the New England Conference, he served three times president of the California Conference (1879–1887, 1891–1894, 1908–1911) and also of the Maine Conference (1884–1886). He and Mary founded the first Tract and Missionary Society (forerunner of the General Conference Personal Ministries Department), and from 1870 to 1889 Stephen promoted and organized that work from local societies to the General Conference. Haskell popularized the Bible reading method of religious discourse among Seventh-day Adventists. In November 1883 the General Conference session endorsed this question-and-answer method and authorized a monthly magazine, Bible Reading Gazette, forerunner of the book Bible Readings for the Home Circle. For Haskell, the Bible reading method became his favorite mode of presentation, which he taught to others through the Bible Training School and later Bible Handbook.

== Mission work ==
In 1885, Haskell was in charge of the first group of Seventh-day Adventist missionaries who went to open the work in Australia. Together with two other Adventist preachers, John Corliss and Mendel Israel, he helped start the Signs Publishing Company first began as the Echo Publishing Company, in North Fitzroy, a suburb of Melbourne, which by 1889, was the third largest Seventh-day Adventist publishing house in the world. He also founded South Lancaster Academy (now Atlantic Union College) in 1882.

From 1889 to 1890 he traveled to many parts of the world on behalf of Adventist missionary work. His wife died in 1894, and in 1897 he married Hetty Hurd and with her did evangelistic and Bible work in Australia and the United States. He also authored several books including: The Story of Daniel the Prophet, The Story of the Seer of Patmos, and The Cross and its Shadow. Haskell died in National City, California on October 9, 1922.

== Vegetarianism ==
Haskell was a vegetarian, and abstained from alcohol and tobacco. He argued that the food God intended for humankind were "fruits, grains, and nuts". Haskell believed that God, health and compassion for animals were interconnected and that God would punish those who abused animals. Haskell visited Auckland in 1885 and attempted to convert those around him to vegetarianism. However, on one occasion Haskell admitted to eating corned beef on his way to England aboard the Majestic as he was alleged to have starved on bread, cheese, and butter.

== See also ==
- History of the Seventh-day Adventist Church
- List of missionaries to the South Pacific
- Seventh-day Adventist Church Pioneers
