= John Samuel Edmonds =

English missionary (1799–1865)

John Samuel Edmonds (1799 in Dorset, England – 1865 in Kerikeri, New Zealand) was a New Zealand missionary, trader, stone mason and founding father.

== Early life ==
John was the son of Robert Edmonds and Priscilla Edmonds (née Edmonds) of Dorset, England. While his parents had the same surname, they had a common ancestor at least five to six generations back. He married his first wife, Mary Ann Stickland (1804 in Swanage, Dorset, England to 9 March 1862 in Parnell, Auckland, New Zealand), on 25 July 1822 in Swanage, Dorset, England. They had four of their children in England before boarding the ship, Elizabeth on route to Australia and New Zealand upon the glowing recommendation of Rev. John Tucker who also journeyed to New Zealand with the Edmonds family. Their fifth child was born in Hobart, Tasmania and the remainder of their children were born in the Northland Region of New Zealand.

Edmonds would work as a catechist for the Church Missionary Society. He was a stone mason by trade, and helped build the wharf at Kerikeri in the late 1830s. He owned land at Kerikeri, where he built a stone house for his family, now known as the Edmonds Ruins. After Mary Anne's death, Edmonds would marry widow, Ellen Davies (née Hunter) with whom he had two children together.

== Children ==
John Samuel's children were:

=== With Mary Ann ===
- Samuel John Edmonds, born 18 November 1823 in Yorkshire, England, died 1888 in Auckland, New Zealand. He married Louisa Makepeace in 1853 and had 11 children. He was involved in the publication of the first newspaper in New Zealand to be printed completely in Te Reo Maori, The Korimako. Samuel line currently are in possession of the family bible handed down to the eldest son as was tradition at the time.
- Arthur Edmonds (also known as Aata Edmonds), born 21 September 1825 in Kent, England, died 1914 in Haruru Falls, Bay of Islands. He would first marry Erana Kaire in 1845, and then Ani Ngarepe. He had 8 children by his first wife and 6 by his second. He was disowned by his father for having married Maori women.
- William Edmonds, born 7 February 1829 in Kent, England and died 1897 in Auckland, New Zealand. He married Emmeline Shearer in Auckland in 1856.
- Henry Edmonds, born 4 December 1831 in Southborough, Kent, England and died in 1906 in Kerikeri, New Zealand. He married Anne Catherine Wilson Kemp in 1866 and had 9 children.
- Alfred Samuel Edmonds, born 7 December 1833 in Hobart, Tasmania, and died 1898 in Tairua, Coromandel. He married Erana Te Onerere, by whom he had three children. He later married Sarah Anne Makepeace, a sister of his eldest brother Samuel's wife, Louisa, and had 3 more children.
- John Tucker Edmonds, born 1835 and died in 1918 at Haruru Falls. He was named after the Rev. John Tucker. He married Raiha Pekama in 1857 and together they had 13 children. He did have a first marriage and had children to this wife but no information is known about her or those children. Like his older brother, Arthur, John was disowned by his father but for a different reason. When John Samuel listed his children in the family bible he omitted John Tucker Edmonds and would refer to him as "Edmonds by name but not by blood". It is speculated that Mary Ann and the Rev. John Tucker had an affair and as to not cause controversy within the Missionary community, John Samuel claimed John Tucker Edmonds as his own but only by name.
- Rueben Edmonds, born 1836 in Kerikeri, New Zealand.
- Joseph Edmonds born 1836 in Kerikeri, New Zealand and died in 1882. He married Felicia Tremain and then Annie Coyle. He had 3 children by Coyle.
- Jane Elizabeth Edmonds, born 1837 in Kerikeri, New Zealand and died in Rhode Island. She married George Edward Budlong, an American whaler who had settled in the Bay of Islands in 1857. They had 6 children together. In 1870 she and two of her children travelled to New Bedford on board the Alice Cameron.
- Sarah Gammon Edmonds, born 1839 in Kerikeri, New Zealand. She married Louis Goffe in 1857 and then Samuel Francis Prockter. She had 5 children by Louis Goffe.
- Matilda Edmonds, born 1843, she married John Wright Hingston in 1864. They had 8 children.

=== With Ellen ===
- John George Petingale Edmonds
- Mary Anne Edmonds

== Notable descendants ==
- Clarence R. Budlong, American tennis player
- Brendon Edmonds, rugby union player
- David Edmonds, cricketer
- Huia Edmonds, rugby union player
- Te Atawhai Hudson-Wihongi, football player
- Akira Ioane, rugby union player, son of Sandra Wihongi and brother of Reiko Ioane
- Nanaia Mahuta, politician
- Adam Parore, cricket player
- Chris Tremain, politician and son of Kel Tremain
- Garrick Tremain, artist, brother of Kel Tremain and uncle of Chris Tremain
- Kel Tremain, rugby union player
- Karena Wihongi, rugby union player
- Verina Wihongi, Olympic Taekwondo practitioner
- David Wikaira-Paul, actor
