= William Watt (missionary) =

Scottish missionary (1843–1926)

William Watt (1843–1926) was a Scottish missionary to the New Hebrides (now Vanuatu). He was ordained as a minister of the Reformed Presbyterian Church of Scotland in 1868, and arrived in the New Hebrides the following year. He served on the island of Tanna for more than forty years, retiring to Australia in 1910. Watt operated a printing press on his mission station. He wrote about the cannibalism practised on the island.
