= Daniel Macdonald (missionary) =

Scottish-Australian missionary (1846–1927)

Daniel Macdonald (4 March 1846 – 18 April 1927) was a missionary to the New Hebrides (now Vanuatu). He was born in Alloa, Scotland, but migrated to Ballarat, Victoria. He studied at the Presbyterian Theological Hall in Melbourne, and was the first Australian-trained Presbyterian missionary to the New Hebrides.

Macdonald served at Port Havannah on the island of Efate from 1872 to 1905. He was the "most notable linguist in the history of the New Hebrides Mission", and was the "organising translator-editor" of the Nguna–Efate Old Testament published in 1908. He, John W. Mackenzie, and Peter Milne each contributed approximately one third of the translation. Macdonald espoused the idea that Oceanic languages were of Semitic origin, and promoted a hybrid Efatese language. He and Milne were involved in a feud that lasted for more than fifteen years, which started with a disagreement over how to translate the word "God" in the local language.

Macdonald was a major promoter of the Australasian New Hebrides Company which was founded in 1889, lobbying prominent Australian businesspeople and members of parliament to invest in the firm in order to forestall French influence in the New Hebrides.

Macdonald was awarded a Doctor of Divinity degree from McGill University, and served as moderator of the Presbyterian Church of Victoria in 1896.

He married Elizabeth Keir Geddie, daughter of missionary Rev. John Geddie.
