= Sailasa Naucukidi =

Fijian missionary

Sailasa Naucukidi was a Fijian Methodist-Wesleyan missionary who volunteered to take the Gospel of Jesus Christ to New Britain, Papua New Guinea in 1876. In 1878, he was martyred and his remains cannibalized. His remains along with other Fijian martyrs lay buried atop the Vunela Fijian martyrs cemetery Kabakada, East New Britain.

== Life ==
The mission to New Britain was launched in 1875. Wesleyan pastor George Brown, the organizer, met with colonial opposition, as a result of British policy after the tragic epidemic which killed 40,000 in Fiji. He finally appealed to the students of Navuloa, the Methodist Theological School at the time, describing the dangers and pointing out that they might well be going to their deaths. Eighty three students were present and heard the appeal and after consulting their wives and families they all volunteered.

The colonial government because of its strict native out-migration policy after the measles epidemic in early 1875 finally relented. By 1876 the new mission field at New Britain had been divided into two areas, one under Aminio Baledrokadroka and the other under Sailasa, and there were 14 teachers’ stations.

Thus began Fiji’s own missionary enterprise. In the year 1878, Sailasa the Fijian minister was journeying inland with a small party south of Kabakada on the Gazelle peninsula, and preaching the Gospel as he went, when they were suddenly attacked, slain and their bodies dismembered and cannibalized.

As Thomas Baker was martyred in Fiji, so was Sailasa Naucukidi in New Britain as a result of the Wesleyan Church's proselytization missions in the latter part of the nineteenth century in the South Pacific.

Lelean Memorial School, at Davuilevu, Nausori, Fiji, honours his memory by naming one of its four houses after him.

Fijian Methodist missionaries have since helped spread the gospel in New Guinea, the Solomon Islands, Northern Australia, Vanuatu and recently to the Caribbean.
