= Aminio Baledrokadroka =

Fijian missionary

Aminio Baledrokadroka (died 1926) was the charismatic leader of Fiji's Methodist (Wesleyan) missionary band to New Britain Island, Papua New Guinea in the latter part of the nineteenth century. He displayed excellent qualities of leadership in adversity and paved the way for later generations of native Fijian missionaries in spreading Christianity to other parts of Papua New Guinea and the Solomon Islands.

== Life ==
The mission to New Britain was launched in June 1875, just forty years after the first Wesleyan missionaries Cargill and Cross brought Christianity to Fiji's shores in 1835. Just months after the tragic measles epidemic which killed 40,000 in Fiji, Reverend George Brown the Methodist missionary, appealed to the students of Navuloa Methodist Mission School, to embark on spreading the Christian gospel to their Melanesian brethren. Reverend George Brown, emphasized to the zealous native Fijian converts the dangers involved in missionary work and pointed out that they might well be going to their deaths. Eighty three students who attended the mission school were present and heard Brown's appeal. They were cautioned to consult with their wives and families in deciding to volunteer for the mission. It is recorded in the Fiji Methodist Church which was then governed by the New South Wales Australia Wesleyan synod, that the whole student body as enrolled at Navuloa, offered to go and spread the faith.

The colonial government of the day was not keen on the mounting of the mission, most probably wanting to limit out-migration of natives as the population had been devastated by the measles epidemic earlier that year. A hand picked few were finally chosen by Brown and cleared by the colonial government. They left the shores of Fiji, true to their evangelical calling some never to return. By 1876 the new mission field in New Guinea which originally consisted of fourteen teacher's stations had been divided into two areas, one under Rev. Baledrokadroka and the other under Rev.Sailasa Naucukidi.

The accounts of Aminio Baledrokadroka's deep faith and tales of his miraculous deeds are legendary in the Methodist Church of Fiji. He and his wife Lavenia Tupou returned to Fiji in 1885. He finally retired to his village, in Nasaqalau, Lakeba, Lau where he lies buried. Reverend Aminio Baledrokadroka and his fellow Fijian missionaries proselytization legacy and martyrdom is today honored in Kabakada village and the Province of East New Britain. A memorial monument was erected on top of the buried remains of the four slain martyrs on Vunela hilltop on 15 August 1975, the one hundredth anniversary of the arrival of the Fijian missionaries in the New Guinea islands. The burial site now known as the Fijian Cemetery holds 41 graves which are now part of the Vunela historical tourism site.
