= Thomas Williams (missionary) =

Australian missionary and author (1815–1891)

Thomas Williams (b. 1815 in Horncastle, Lincolnshire, England; d. 1891) was a Wesleyan Methodist and missionary from Adelaide, Australia, who served in Fiji for thirteen years, from 1840 to 1853. Together with the Wesleyan Methodist and missionary James Calvert, who is regarded as the "father" of the Fiji missions and served in Fiji for seventeen years, he produced a significant work on Fijian culture, language, and society.

Thomas Williams and James Calvert: Fiji and the Fijians (New York, 1860)

== Fiji and the Fijians ==
The work Fiji and the Fijians by Thomas Williams and James Calvert was first published in London in 1858, edited by George Stringer Rowe, and appeared in New York in 1859. The book addresses the origins of the natives, warlike tendencies, industrial products, customs, traditions, religion, and language, and includes notes on the pronunciation of the Fijian language.

The Journal of Thomas Williams, Missionary in Fiji, 1840–1853 was published in 1931 and documents his experiences during his years of missionary work.

His and Calvert's works are considered central sources for the history of Fiji and missionary activity in the South Pacific islands.

== Publications ==
Fiji and the Fijians: The Islands and Their Inhabitants

  - London, 1858 (digitized copy)
  - New York, 1859 (I, II)
- New York, 1860 transcription project
  - Third Edition
    - London, 1870 (digitized copy)
    - Boston, 1871 (digitized copy)

Journal

  - Henderson, G.C. (ed.): The Journal of Thomas Williams, Missionary in Fiji, 1840–1853. Angus & Robertson Ltd., Australien 1931

== Bibliography ==
- Gunson, Niel. "Thomas Williams (1815–1891)". Australian Dictionary of Biography. National Centre of Biography, Australian National University.
