= Isobel Schenk =

Australian missionary (1898–1980)

Isobel May "Mysie" Schenk, BEM (née Johnston; 10 January 1898 – 6 October 1980) was a Christian missionary who worked for many years alongside her husband, Rev. Rodolphe Samuel Schenk (1888–1969), at the Mount Margaret Mission in Western Australia. Rev. Schenk established the mission in 1921, under the auspices of the Aboriginal Inland Mission (later the United Aborigines Mission (UAM)).

She was born in Prahran, Victoria in 1898 to William Johnston and Mary Marcella McKay Johnston. She was a typist when she met Rodolphe Schenk in Melbourne, where they married. She later "taught crafts to the women" on the mission. The mission was made a central 'rationing station' and was visited by anthropologists and researchers including A. P. Elkin, Phyllis Kaberry, Joseph Birdsell and Norman Tindale.

Along with the Chief Protector of Aborigines in Western Australia, these researchers engaged in the assimilation debates of the day. Rev. Schenk's "unsympathetic and fundamentalist interference with traditional practices"—such as infanticide, the ritual drinking of blood ... and in-law avoidance laws—attracted criticism from A. P. Elkin, and resistance from Aboriginal elders. Many Aboriginal children were taken to the mission, which had a children's home and a hospital, and mining- and pastoral -related work was carried out there.

== BEM ==
Isobel May Schenk was awarded the BEM in the 1978 New Year Honours for her work in Aboriginal welfare.

== Death ==
Isobel May Schenk died in October 1980 in Albany, Western Australia.

== Family ==
The Schenks had three daughters and a son, who survived their parents: Margaret Morgan, Esther Milnes, Elizabeth Miller, and Roderick Schenk.
