= Joseph Annand =

Canadian missionary (1844–1932)

Joseph Annand (1 January 1844 – 28 January 1932) was a missionary from Nova Scotia to the New Hebrides (now known as Vanuatu). He studied at Dalhousie College, Princeton Theological Seminary, and Pine Hill Divinity Hall before being ordained to missionary service in 1872. He served on Efate and Aneityum before being appointed the inaugural principal of the Teachers' Training Institute on Tangoa in 1894. He served in this position until his retirement in 1913.

According to Arthur M. Smith, Annand "firmly believed in the superiority of Western culture and Christianity," and was "determined to stamp out traditional native practices, or 'kastom,' through the introduction of Western material culture".
