= James Calvert (missionary) =

English missionary (1813–1892)

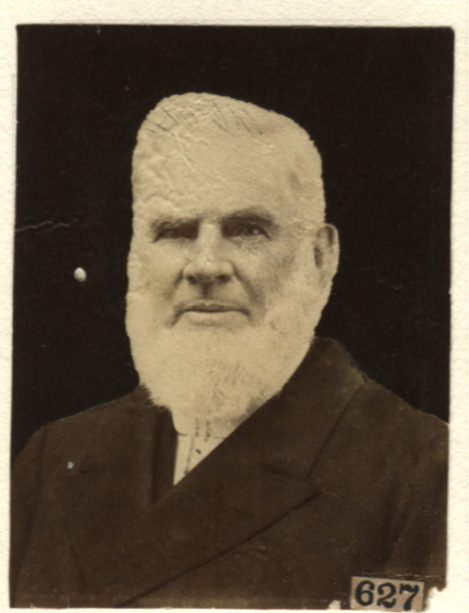

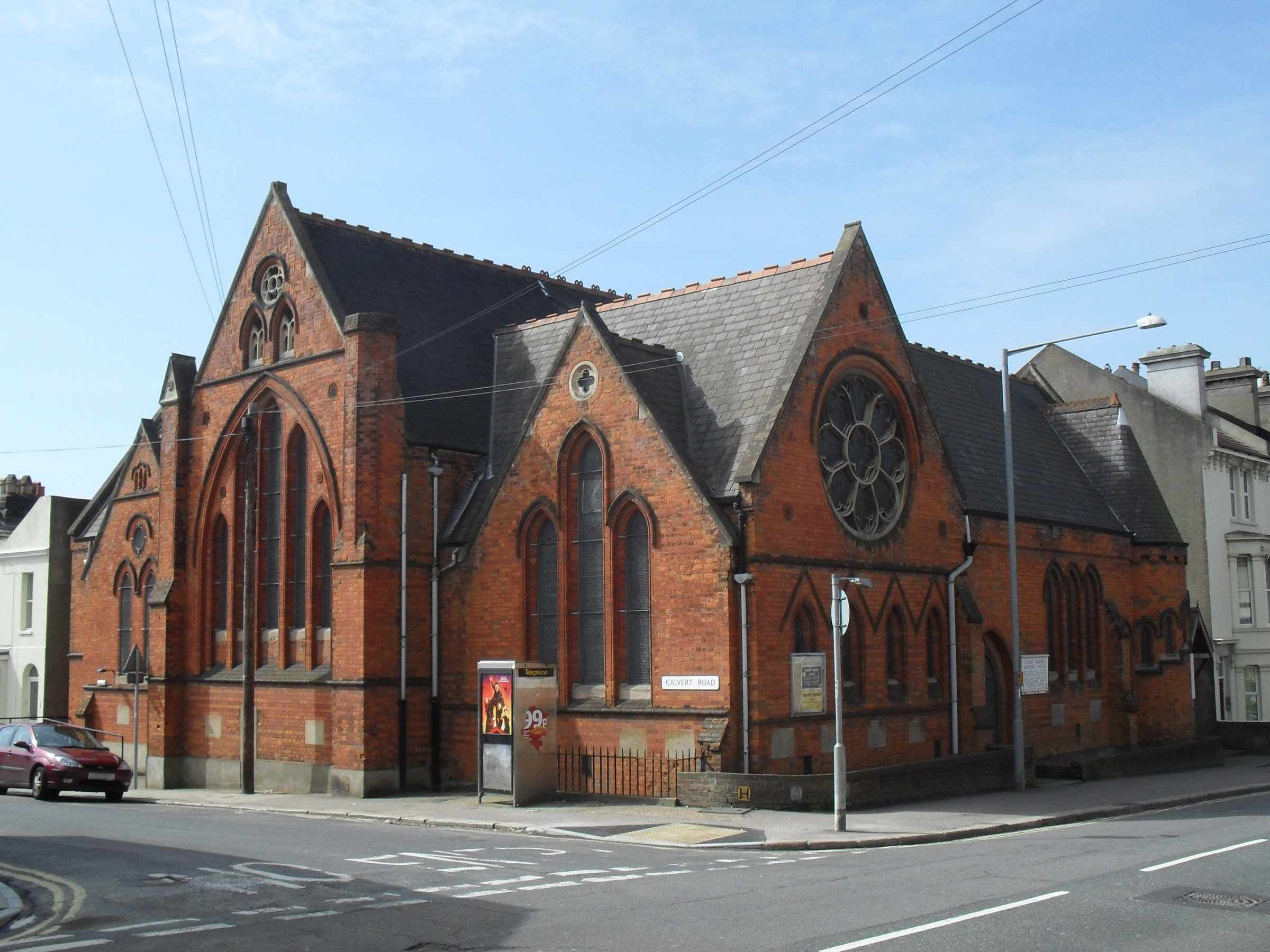
Calvert founded this Wesleyan chapel in Hastings, now called the Calvert Memorial Methodist Chapel.

James Calvert (3 January 1813 – 8 March 1892), was a Methodist missionary.

James Calvert was a native of Pickering, in the North Riding of Yorkshire. He was sent out in 1838, in company with John Hunt, to work as a missionary in Fiji. From 1837 Fijian chiefs had regarded missionaries as a threat to their authority. He remained in Fiji until December 1855, during which time he witnessed a successful advance of Christianity. He returned to Fiji (May 1861-July 1864) as Chairman of the Wesleyan District of Fiji.

In his work with the Fijians, Calvert was supported by his wife, Mary Fowler Calvert. They had married on 22 March 1838, five weeks before sailing for Fiji (via Sydney). They had four daughters and three sons, all born in Fiji. Mary died in January 1882 in Torquay. In February 1889 James Calvert married his second wife, Matilda, the widow of the Rev. Dr. Andrew Kessen.

Through Calvert's ministry the Fijian King Seru Epenisa Cakobau was converted to Christianity, renounced polygamy, and for many years after lived a consistent life. His last act as a king was to cede Fiji to the United Kingdom.

In February 1856 Calvert sailed from Sydney to England on the "Light of the Age", arriving on 23 May 1856. The family settled at Woodbridge in Suffolk. During his stay in Britain he superintended the printing of the Bible in the Fijian language. Following his second period of Missionary service in Fiji, he and his wife arrived back in England on the "Yatala" in May 1866. After living in Bromley from 1867 to 1871, in 1872 he was sent out by the Wesleyan Missionary Society to South Africa. He and his wife Mary returned to England from South Africa in 1881.

James Calvert died at Hastings, England, in 1892 aged 79. In that year he founded a Wesleyan chapel in Hastings; after his death it was named the Calvert Memorial Chapel. Two of his daughters pre-deceased him. His youngest son James (c.1852-1910) attended New Kingswood School from 1863 to 1866, and in October 1885 married Elizabeth Anna Clarke, the second daughter of John Creemer Clarke MP; his father presiding at their wedding. James Calvert (junior) went on to become a member of the London Stock Exchange in 1887.

== See also ==
- Thomas Williams (missionary)
