= Constance Fairhall =

British missionary nurse (1906–1993)

Constance Fairhall MBE
- Fairhall from a 1934 missionary magazine
- Born: Constance Grace Fairhall; 11 March 1906; Worthing, England
- Died: 30 March 1993 (aged 87); Worthing, England
- Other name: Paul
- Occupation: Missionary nurse

Constance Fairhall MBE (11 March 1906 – 30 March 1993), also known as Paul, was a missionary nurse from Tunbridge Wells, England. In 1936 she established hospitals to treat leprosy and TB on a small island near Port Moresby, Papua New Guinea, where she served for 37 years. She published three books about her experiences.

== Personal life ==
Fairhall was born in Worthing, England to Albert Thomas Fairhall (1863-1946) and Grace Fairhall, née Holder. She had two sisters and a brother from her father's first marriage. Fairhall attended Tunbridge Wells High School for Girls and joined the Mount Pleasant Congregational Church aged 15. She was a Sunday School leader and Girl Guide leader. When she was 18 her mother died. Fairhall cared for her father for two years, before moving to London to train as a nurse. In 1970, after nursing in Papua New Guinea for 37 years, she returned to Tunbridge Wells.

== Papua New Guinea ==
Fairhall was a state registered nurse. She trained at St Bartholomew's Hospital, London, graduating in 1931, and the Elsie Inglis Memorial Maternity Hospital in Edinburgh. She joined the London Missionary Society (LMS) in 1932 and began nursing in Port Moresby, Papua New Guinea in 1933, where she initially worked at a mission hospital in Hanuabada on the outskirts of Port Moresby. With the encouragement of Papua New Guinea's lieutenant-governor Hubert Murray and the support of the local government, she "persuaded the people of Papua to lend her Gemo Island" (official name: Hanudamava), a 128-acre island, 3 miles off the coast. In 1936 she established isolation hospitals on the island for people with tuberculosis and leprosy.

== World War II ==
When war broke out, some missionary nurses including Fairhall volunteered to stay to care for the injured. However, it was deemed that "the presence of white women would add too heavy a responsibility to the problems of the men", so in February 1942, together with Anne Cole, Fairhall was one of the last two civilians to be evacuated from Port Moresby to Australia. During the war, Gemo was occupied by Australian troops and the hospital buildings were used as a prison.

Between 1942 and 1944, Fairhall joined the Australian Army Nursing Service, and spent time at a field hospital near the Adelaide River, Darwin. In 1944, having herself contracted TB, Fairhall travelled to the UK to recuperate. She received invitations from the Federation of Congregational Women and the Guide International Service to join a volunteer team in Yugoslavia, but Fairhall remained in the UK to work with the LMS.

== Return to Papua New Guinea ==
Fairhall returned to Papua New Guinea in 1947, reopening both hospitals before moving on to other regions. Between 1947 and 1962 she travelled the country, working in "15 different areas, teaching, counselling and generally helping," including Port Moresby (1949), Koaru (1952 to 1953), Kapuna (1953 to 1955) and Delena (1958 to 1960). When a community complex was built in Hohola, Fairhall was invited to take charge of the clinic and welfare centre, which necessitated her resignation from the LMS. In 1962 she joined the Papua New Guinea government's Department of Social Development and Home Affairs. She also worked on the provisional committee of the local YMCA and was a lecturer of medicine at the Bomana Mental Hospital. During this work, she met and worked with Dame Rachel Cleland.

In June 1970, Fairhall was awarded an MBE "in recognition of her work as a welfare officer with the department of Social Development and Home Affairs in Papua and New Guinea."

== Return to England ==
After returning to England in 1970, Fairhall worked with overseas missionary students at St Andrews Hall, Birmingham. She returned to Mount Pleasant Church in Tunbridge Wells. Between 1972 and 1980 she worked as an assistant warden at Lomas House, a home for retired missionaries, in Worthing.

In her will she bequeathed her body to the University of London's School of Anatomy.

== Books ==
Fairhall published three books about her experiences in Papua New Guinea:

- Where Two Tides Meet (1945) – Pub. Edinburgh House Press
- Island of Happiness (1952) – illustrated by Helen Jacobs. Pub. British missionary societies
- Some Shape of Beauty (1961) – Pub. London Missionary Society

== See also ==
- Vision and Reality in Pacific religion (2001) Ed. Herda, P. Reilly, M. Hilliard, D Pub. University of Canterbury, New Zealand. Chapter Where Tides Meet: The Missionary Career of Constance (Paul) Fairhall in Papua by Diane Langmore ISBN 9781740761970
