= James Kekela =

Hawaiian missionary (1824–1904)

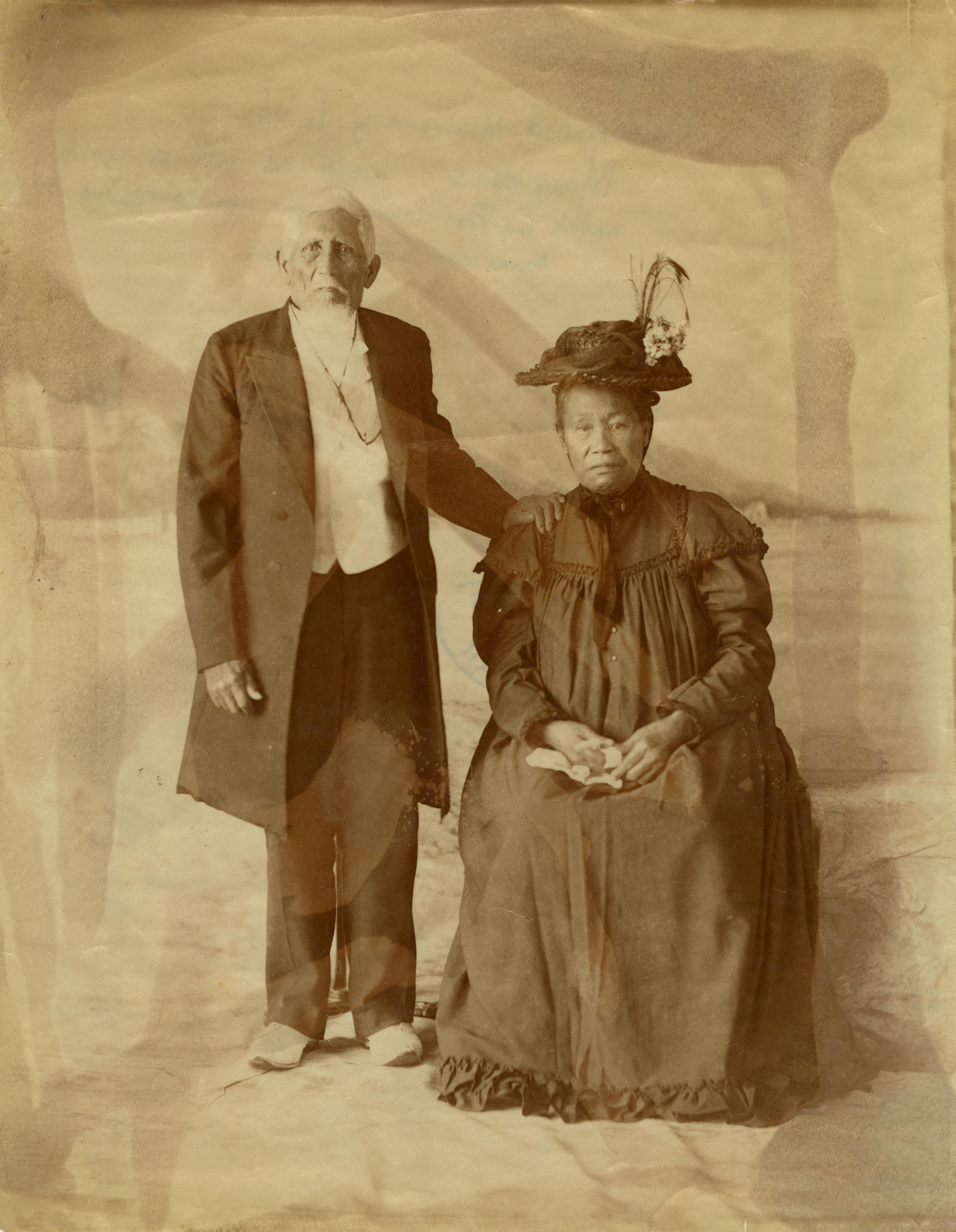
James Kekela and his wife Naomi

James Hunnewell Kekela (May 22, 1824 – November 29, 1904) was born in Mokulēʻia, Waialua, on the island of Oahu. He was the first Native Hawaiian to be ordained a Protestant minister in 1849. He worked as a missionary in the Marquesas Islands. President Abraham Lincoln presented him with a gold pocket watch after he rescued an American sailor from cannibals.

== Life ==
At an early age, he was educated in the Christian faith by American missionary Reverend John S. Emerson, stationed in Waialua. He attended the Sunday school of Reverend Benjamin Wyman Parker. He also attended the Lahainaluna Seminary at the expense of Captain James Hunnewell, whose name he adopted as his own.

On December 21, 1849, Kekela was ordained as a Protestant minister, the first Native Hawaiian to be ordained. He initially worked as a pastor preaching at a small church in Kahuku, on the island of Oahu, and in 1852, he accompanied a reconnaissance mission to Micronesia to scout out new mission grounds. In 1853, Kekela and his wife Naomi were asked to join the new Protestant mission in the Marquesas Islands.

From 1853 until his retirement in 1899, Kekela lived and worked in the Marquesas Islands. He would head the mission along with Reverend Samuel Kauwealoha and Reverend Zachariah Hapuku (who arrived in 1861). Other missionary couples followed as well. The impact of the Hawaiian mission was reportedly small and met with many setbacks. Despite this, the modern Protestant Church in the Marquesas "retained the imprint of its Hawaiian founders". On January 14, 1864, Kekela rescued an American sailor Jonathan Whalon, of the New Bedford whaling vessel, the Congress, from a cannibal chief and his followers on Hiva Oa. In gratitude for his service to an American citizen, President Abraham Lincoln awarded him a gold Cartier pocket watch. The watch bore the inscription:

From the President of the United States to Rev. J. Kekela For His Noble Conduct in Rescuing An American Citizen from Death on the Island of Hiva Oa January 14, 1864.

After retiring to his native Hawaii in 1899, he died on November 29, 1904, in Honolulu. He was buried at the cemetery of Kawaiahaʻo Church. He and his wife Naomi, who was educated at Wailuku Female Seminary, had many children; two sons and four daughters were reported at the time of his death.

== Bibliography ==
- Kuykendall, Ralph Simpson (1965) [1938]. The Hawaiian Kingdom 1778–1854, Foundation and Transformation. Vol. 1. Honolulu: University of Hawaii Press. ISBN 0-87022-431-X. OCLC 47008868.
- Lange, Raeburn (2006). Island Ministers: Indigenous Leadership in Nineteenth Century Pacific Islands Christianity (PDF). Christchurch, New Zealand: Macmillan Brown Centre for Pacific Studies, University of Canterbury. ISBN 978-1-74076-176-5. Archived from the original (PDF) on 2017-02-23.
