= Rodolphe Samuel Schenk =

Australian missionary (1888–1969)

Rodolphe Samuel Schenk (29 October 1888, Macorna, Victoria – 7 August 1969) was an Australian missionary.

He attended a New South Wales interdenominational theological college and in 1917 joined the United Aborigines' Mission. From Walgett, where he built a bag church and a wooden hut for himself, he ministered to Aboriginal communities, travelling long distances by motor cycle, addressing meetings and making converts. In 1920 he spent four months in Melbourne preparing for a new mission on the Western Australian goldfields near Laverton ().

Choosing the old Mount Margaret goldfield, he leased its common and began to erect huts and raise goats to finance provision of rations. Soon groups of Aborigines came to 'sit down' at the mission and helped to build fences, shepherd goats and pull sandalwood. His success in attracting Aborigines and his policy of paying them modest wages antagonized local pastoralists who tried to sabotage the mission and have it moved into the desert ().

In Melbourne on 14 October 1922 Schenk married Isobel May Johnston, a typist; at Mount Margaret she taught crafts to the women. The products helped to finance the mission, as did the publication of Schenk's 'prayer letters' by the U.A.M. and concerts given by the Mount Margaret Minstrels. School classes began in 1926, and from 1932 Mrs. Mary Bennett taught there. It was in basic literacy and numeracy, craft and vocational training that the mission made its greatest impact.

Mount Margaret had been secure from 1927 when police began to entrust Aborigines of part-descent who were state wards to Schenk's care rather than to the Moore River government settlement north of Perth. This was approved by the chief protector of Aborigines A. O. Neville, who strengthened Schenk's hand by making the mission a central rationing station. Thirty children were accommodated in the first Graham Home by 1930; parents were encouraged to settle at the mission — unlike the dormitory-based régimes of other Aboriginal institutions.

The mission used a "no work, no rations" formula. Earning opportunities expanded with the installation of a small ore-crushing battery, and low-grade alluvial ore was exploited by Aboriginal miners. Others learned carpentry, shearing and station work ().

Schenk originally purchased miners' huts and building material which he reassembled at Mount Margaret; the Depression allowed him to buy more buildings. Water was a problem but medical facilities were provided by Mrs. Bennett's gift of the Christisson Memorial Hospital in 1936. By 1933 the European staff at Mount Margaret numbered ten, there were forty-one students at the school and the mission had the appearance of a regular township.

Difficulties surfaced when Aboriginal elders resisted Schenk's "unsympathetic and fundamentalist interference" with traditional practices. He opposed infanticide, the ritual drinking of blood, the use of sacred boards (which he thought were deified), and in-law avoidance laws which undermined his mass meetings. While not conversant with the local languages, he advised his subordinates to learn them and his daughters Margaret, Esther and Elizabeth became fluent.

Mount Margaret was visited in 1930 by A. P. Elkin and Phyllis Kaberry who hoped to conduct field-work there. Elkin later criticized Schenk's attitude to traditional Aboriginal beliefs; in turn the missionary accused the anthropologists of fostering "works of darkness" and "the resurgence of the devil". However, J. B. Birdsell and Norman Tindale, who came in 1939, thought Mount Margaret "the best solution to the pressing half-caste problem".

Supporting the mission's assimilationist approach, Tindale predicted that it would become less relevant to Aborigines as they entered white society. Nevertheless, Schenk bitterly opposed the 'merge' and 'absorb' policy for Aborigines of mixed descent which Neville advocated; he resented the chief protector's complaint that the growing Mount Margaret population was undermining assimilation. After World War II outside employment attracted many older residents but they were replaced by tribal people from the Central Reserve. Schenk had contributed to setting up another U.A.M. settlement at Warburton Range in 1933.

In 1954 Schenk retired to Esperance where he died on 7 August 1969, aged 80, survived by his wife, three daughters and son.
