= Gregory Warner (missionary surgeon) =

Gregory Warner (c. 1805–after 1811) was a British missionary surgeon affiliated with the London Missionary Society. Trained for medical service in response to urgent appeals from Tahiti, he was ordained in London and deployed to the South Pacific, where he served in New South Wales, Tahiti, and Huahine. Warner played a crucial role in providing medical aid to island leaders and participated in the early efforts to Christianize the Society Islands. His writings challenge certain missionary narratives and offer detailed insight into indigenous health and cultural practices. After parting ways with the LMS, Warner traveled through China and India, where he continued his medical work, though little is known about his later life.

== From Spa Fields to Tahiti: The Journey of a Missionary Surgeon ==
For several years, the missionaries had pleaded to the Directors for a replacement surgeon after various failed appointments. They eventually trained Warner, a member of the London Itinerant Society, for the task and the LMS press broadcast his appointment. In 1805, the Directors sent a letter to Marsden that conveyed the purpose of his role. The letter expressed their anxiety that the Tahitian mission lacked an adequate portion of medical skill and noted that the maladies brought on the natives by the Vices of Europeans demand also their compassionate interference. They continued saying that on these grounds they had been induced to place Mr Warner for three years past in such situations as were the most favourable for the acquisition of Knowledge of Surgery and Medicine.

Warner was appointed to the South Seas as a missionary surgeon and was ordained on October 7, 1805, at Spa Fields Chapel in London. He sailed to the South Pacific on November 6, 1805, and arrived in New South Wales in August 1806. He was initially assigned to the Hawkesbury Settlement by Samuel Marsden. However, Warner soon traveled to Tahiti to continue his missionary work, arriving there on May 12, 1807 aboard the Elizabeth.

== Saving Pomare II and his Stepfather Tenania from a certain death ==
In his medical journal from his time in Tahiti between 1807 and 1808, Warner recorded the various treatments he prescribed to members of the mission. He also noted attending to Pōmare II and his step father, Tenania who had fallen gravely ill after consuming poorly distilled alcohol. His skill and care saved their lives, and Ariipaea temporarily lost the use of his legs after the incident but eventually recovered.

== A Few venereal diseases ==
Gregory Warner’s medical observations from May 17, 1808 offer a striking counterpoint to the London Missionary Society’s claims about widespread venereal disease in Tahiti. After spending twelve months among the islanders, Warner reported encountering only one case of the disease. He acknowledged that symptoms might be concealed by some individuals, but emphasized that he had not observed any of the typical signs—such as chancres, buboes, throat ulcers, scalp lesions, skin blotches, or venereal nodes—among the population.

== Political Upheaval and Missionary Transitions in Huahine ==
Due to increasing unrest and an insurrection against Pomare II in Tahiti, Warner relocated with other missionaries to Huahine embarking aboard the Perseverance on November 10, 1808. The missionaries’ arrival in Huahine coincided with a period of political upheaval and shifting alliances across the Society Islands

While at Huahine, the missionaries encountered several prominent figures from the Leeward Islands, including Tehaapapa I, Tamatoa III, Tapoa I, Teriitaria II, Nohorai, Puru, Ari'ipaea, and his wife Itia, the former wife of Pomare I, as well as other chiefs from neighboring islands. The military and matrimonial alliances forged between these leaders and the Pomare family played a major role in consolidating peace in Tahiti and laying the groundwork for the spread of Christianity throughout the Society Islands. The goal set by the London Missionary Society will be achieved in November 1815 after the battle of Fei Pi.

== Dangerous passage via the Fiji Islands ==
Warner’s stay in Huahine was brief. On October 17, 1809, the brig Hibernia, under Captain William Campbell, anchored in the harbor of Fare, accompanied by the Port Jackson schooner Venus, commanded by Captain John Burback. Campbell had recently succeeded in recapturing the Venus from the rebellious natives of Tahiti. Most of the missionaries, departed Huahine on October 26, 1809, aboard the Hibernia, which was bound for the Fiji Islands to collect a cargo of sandalwood for the Chinese market.

James Hayward and the elderly William Caw, who had already ended his association with the London Missionary Society, chose to remain behind. The only other remaining English missionary, apart from Hayward, was Henry Nott, who was in Moorea. Together, they sustained the Christianization efforts initiated in 1797—efforts that history would ultimately vindicate.

The Hibernia sustained damage in Fiji and was brought ashore on November 20 at an islet off the Macuata coast for repairs. Several of the missionaries went ashore to prepare a hut for their residence. On November 28, 1809, Captain Chase of the Hope, who was aware of their distress, arrived and anchored near the islet. On December 4, with the assistance of the Americans, the vessel was partially hove down. The damage was found to be less severe than anticipated, and the American ship carpenter agreed to undertake the repairs.

During their stay on the islet, the missionaries were supplied with provisions by the Fijians. The locals displayed a great curiosity about the missionaries' women and on several occasions, offered to buy them in exchange for sandalwood or even trade them for some of their own women. On December 28, it was reported that the Fijians had devised a plan to approach the missionaries during the night, with the intention of killing them and seizing their women and property. Upon hearing of this, Captain Chase, displaying great humanity, offered to do anything in his power to assist the missionaries, stating that his ship and guns were at their disposal.

On December 30, 1809, the American carpenter had completed the repairs on the Hibernia. On January 9, 1810, all missionaries and their families boarded the Hibernia, except for Gregory Warner, the surgeon, who had secured a promise of free passage to China aboard the Hope. He intended to travel to India. They set sail in the morning On January 23, 1810, sailing at a rate of six miles an hour, they departed the Fiji Islands.

On February 17, 1810, the Hibernia anchored at Sydney Cove. The missionaries addressed a letter to Governor Macquarie, informing him of their arrival and circumstances, and requesting, as British subjects in distress, the privileges of settlers in the Colony.

== From China To india via Moorea ==
Warner ended up in Macao, near Canton in 1810. According to the LMS press, he had been recommended by Robert Morrison to undertake a mission to Prince of Wales’s Island (Penang). However, Warner never proceeded to Penang. Instead, he traveled to India, where he was likely appointed as a civil surgeon by the East India Company. According to a letter from missionary Henry Nott dated October 10, 1810, Gregory Warner was reported as a passenger aboard the brig Favourite, under the command of Captain Fisk, which made a stop in Moorea while en route to Calcutta.

Though little evidence remains on his time in India, a letter he wrote to the Governor General, Lord Minto did survive. The letter commenced with Warner expressing his deep disappointment at the limited progress made by the London Missionary Society in Tahiti prior to his arrival. Most notably, he condemned what he perceived as widespread sexual permissiveness among the local population, describing it as “lasciviousness... carried to such a pitch as almost to exceed description and belief.”

Gregory Warner’s contributions to the missionary work in the South Pacific, especially in Tahiti and the surrounding islands, were significant in a time of great upheaval. However, little is known about his life after he left the LMS, and his exact date of death remains unclear.
