= Thomas C. Stanford =

American politician (1865–1946)

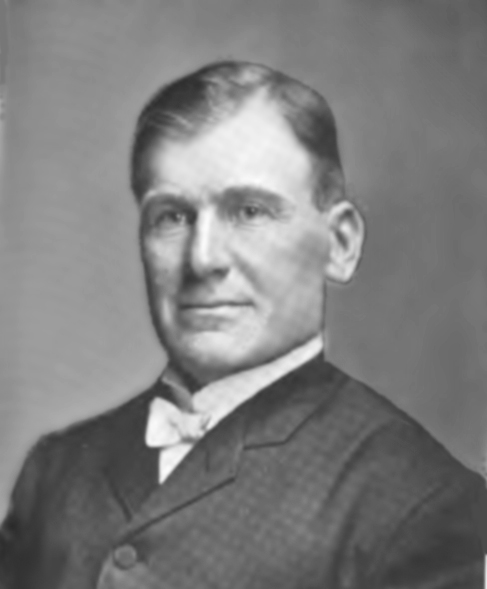

Member of the Idaho House of Representatives
- In office 1907

Personal details
- Born: September 30, 1865 Logan, Utah Territory, U.S.
- Died: January 14, 1946 (aged 80) Boise, Idaho, U.S.
- Resting place: Cloverdale Memorial Park
- Party: Republican
- Spouse: Ida Ivie (m. 1900)
- Children: 4
- Education: Brigham Young University
- Occupation: Politician, rancher
- Known for: Founder of Carey, Idaho

Thomas C. Stanford (September 30, 1865 – January 14, 1946) is the founder of Carey, Idaho. He was a Mormon rancher and a state legislator in Idaho.

== Early years ==
Stanford was born in Logan, Utah Territory, a son of Stephen and Louisa (Forman) Stanford. His father, a native of England, came to Utah Territory in 1861. Of the ten children, Thomas C. was the fifth and was four years old when the family moved to Salt Lake City, where he grew up and received a basic education. He later attended the Brigham Young Academy.

== Homesteading and ranching ==
In 1884, at age nineteen he moved to Albion, Idaho. After a brief stay there, he located a homestead in the Little Wood River valley, which was the center of his operations as a rancher and stockman. Along with operating his own ranch, Stanford also worked for a number of years as a cowboy, stage driver, and freighter.

In 1895 he bought additional land and engaged in sheep raising as well a continuing his interests in cattle and horses. He was regarded as one of the most successful livestock producers in Idaho. In his later years he also raised hogs on an extensive scale. His home place consisted of 160 acres (64.7 hectares) near Carey, Blaine County, Idaho. Further down the valley he had 250 acres (101.2 hectares) of land. Both farms were under irrigation and capable of producing fine crops.

Stanford continued actively in the sheep business until 1918. He then sold his flocks and focused on general ranching and cattle raising. Over the years he replaced the family's original log home with "a beautiful and commodious residence" and similarly upgraded the ranching structures.

== Organizing stock growers ==
Stanford was instrumental in the organized activities of Idaho stock growers and in 1908-10 served as president of the Idaho Wool Growers Association. He was instrumental in getting much legislation passed beneficial to wool growers, and as president of the association called the first meeting that led to the organization of the National Wool Warehouse. Western wool growers organized the National Wool WareHouse and Storage Company at a 1909 meeting in Chicago. Their intent was to deal cooperatively with wool buyers to regularize pricing and avoid wide swings in the supply-demand situation.

== Political activity ==
Stanford was a Republican member of the Ninth Idaho Legislature in the lower house (1907), and Governor Hawley appointed him a member of the livestock board of the state. For many years he played an active and influential role at the Republican state convention. Supporters and friends urged him to run for governor in 1912, but he declined. He did serve in Blaine County as a Justice of the Peace and in other local offices.

== Family and religion ==
In June 1900, he married Ida Ivie, daughter of John Ivie, an old Indian scout, who served during the early Indian wars in Utah. The four children of their marriage were: Roka, Esther, Charles, and Frank.

Mr. Stanford was for a number of years actively connected with the Church of Jesus Christ of Latter-day Saints and served as a missionary in New Zealand for three years and for two years in the United States.

== Community development ==
Mr. Stanford assisted in developing irrigation projects in Blaine County and surrounding parts of Idaho. In fact, his name seems to have been associated both as a worker and liberal contributor to all the community development projects in the Little Wood River valley for many years. He was an organizer of the local telephone company at Carey, served as vice president of the company, and was afterward elected its president. He was also one of the organizers of the Carey State Bank and at one time was president of the Cooperative Store.

He moved to Boise, Idaho in 1945 due to ill health and died there. He is buried in the Cloverdale Memorial Park, west of Boise.
