= Efatese language =

Artificial mixed language of Efate Island in Vanuatu

Efatese
- Fate
- Created by: Daniel Macdonald
- Date: 19th century
- Setting and usage: evangelism on Efate Island, now in Vanuatu
- Purpose: Constructed language: mixed language; Efatese
- Sources: the Oceanic languages of Efate

Language codes
- ISO 639-3: qef (local use), also used for Katembri
- Glottolog: efat1235
- IETF: art-x-efatese

Efatese is an artificial mixed language or zonal auxiliary language of Efate Island in Vanuatu. There are half a dozen languages spoken on Efate, of which the languages of North Efate and South Efate are not particularly closely related, and when missionary activity began on the island, at Port Havannah in the northwest of the island, a mixture of the target languages was invented for evangelism and scripture, in preference to promoting one indigenous language over the others.
