= William Henry (missionary) =

Irish preacher

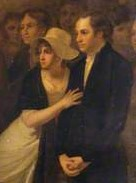
William Henry and wife Sarah at the Cession of Matavai, 1797

William Henry (1770–1859) was an Irish missionary for the London Missionary Society.

== Early life ==
William Henry was born in Sligo, Ireland in 1770, the son of George and Sarah Henry. He trained as a carpenter and joiner and worked in the Sligo shipyards. As a young man, he joined in the persecution of itinerant Methodist preachers but in 1791 was converted and joined the Calvinistic Methodist group known as the Countess of Huntingdon's Connexion. They arranged for Henry's tuition under John Walker, Fellow of Trinity College, Dublin.

The Connexion supported the London Missionary Society, founded in 1795 by Thomas Haweis, chaplain to the Countess. The Society purchased the ship Duff and dispatched 30 missionaries to the South Seas in August 1796. All were tradesmen. There were six married missionaries with their families, among them William Henry and his wife Sarah.

== Tahiti ==
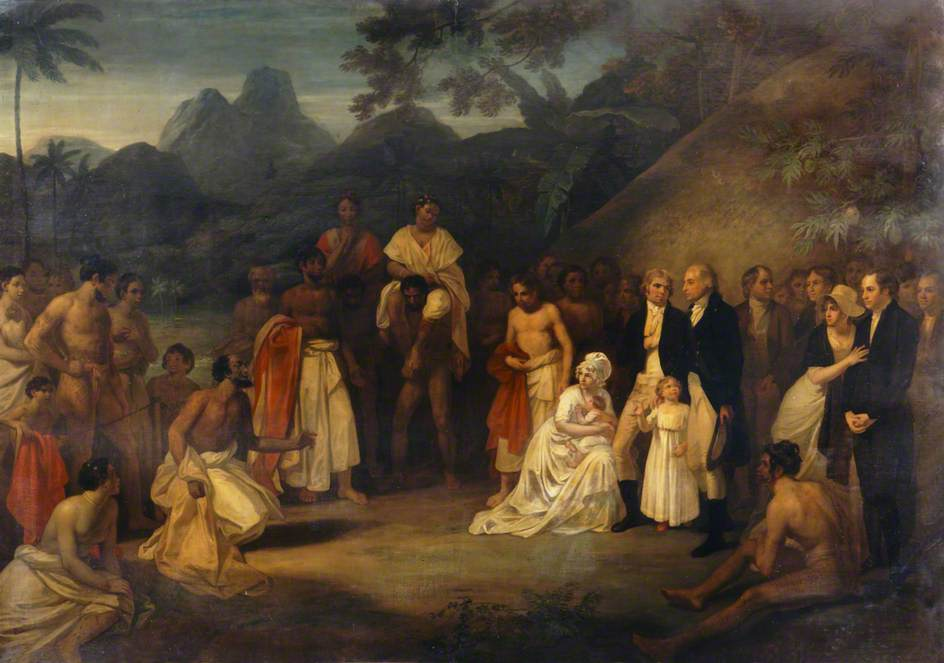
The Cession of the District of Matavai in the Island of Otaheite by Robert Smirke. The standing figures on the right are Henry and wife.

Within a year of arrival, the missionaries became concerned for their safety and left with their families for Sydney where they arrived in May 1798. With James Fleet Cover, William Henry established an itinerant mission based in Parramatta and in 1798-99 preached in the north-western districts of Sydney; Henry's congregation at Kissing Point developed into the congregation of St Anne's.

Henry and his family returned to Tahiti in October 1799 to continue his missionary work. Following a rebellion in late 1808 and the destruction of their homes, seven missionaries and their families again went back to Sydney, where they arrived in the Hibernia in February 1810. Among them was Henry with his wife and three children. He returned to the Kissing Point district where he preached and taught. After a year Henry returned to Tahiti, this time bearing Lachlan Macquarie's appointment as "magistrate for the Pacific Islands". His wife, Sarah, died at Tahiti in July 1812.

Henry went back to Australia. He returned to Tahiti with a new bride, Ann, who retained close contact with her family at Kissing Point. Henry reported regularly to London and maintained contacts with Samuel Marsden at Parramatta who was from 1812 a foreign director of the London Missionary Society. He corresponded with former missionaries including Rowland Hassall, and other colonial clergymen such as John Dunmore Lang.

William Henry served as a missionary in Tahiti and nearby islands for 50 years. When he retired in 1847, he was the longest serving and only survivor of the first band of missionaries to the Pacific. Henry had helped baptise King Pōmare II, resulting in great influence for the missionaries within Tahitian society. As a teacher, he compiled a Tahitian grammar and observed Polynesian customs and culture. As pastor, he participated in the moral, social and civic life of the Tahitian people.

Alarmed by the behaviour of the children of several of the first missionaries, the London Missionary Society decided in 1839 to retire the older men, including William Henry. In October 1842 Henry, his wife and his younger children sailed to Sydney on the Sarah Ann, arriving in December 1842.

== Building The Retreat ==
In January 1843 Henry wrote to the London Missionary Society about his plans to retire and settle at Kissing Point. He asked for a grant of A£200 for building. The Society refused, indicating that a retirement allowance would be made for him and if this was insufficient for his "indispensable wants" they would then consider another request. The Society's letter concluded: We rejoice to perceive that in the retreat you have selected for your declining years, you will not be without opportunities for making known the preciousness of a Saviour's love.

On 24 October 1843 James Shepherd "being desirous of making some provision" for his daughter, Ann Henry, gave her one acre of land, part of James Squire's 30 acre grant, bounded on the east by James Stewart's grant and on the south by the public road to Parramatta. Shepherd appointed Joseph Smith, a coffee planter in Tahiti and her son-in-law, as Ann's trustee. Smith, his wife Elizabeth and her sister Ann, settled in Hawaii, where Smith held a government position.

"The Retreat" homestead was probably built in 1843. The deed of gift specified "in consideration of the premises and of ten shillings" and transferred the land and "the message thereon erected". William Henry, though trained as a carpenter, was an elderly man but one of his (stepsons) sons, James Shepherd Henry (born 1820), was a builder. Ann's brother Isaac Shepherd was apparently also its builder. Isaac owned the adjoining one acre portion which was given to him by his father in 1833. Isaac probably provided the stone for "The Retreat" from his quarry. Stone from James Shepherd Sr.'s nearby quarry had been used to build St Anne's Church in 1826, Addington in the 1830s and Hellenie in 1840.

== Return to Tahiti ==
Henry and his family did not settle down at Kissing Point. In late 1844 he returned to Tahiti "with his family of three idle sons and as many daughters." The resident missionary refused to let his daughters visit the Henry home and Isaac and Daniel Henry were charged with defamation following another clash with him. These personal conflicts were further confused by the political situation and William and Ann Henry's friendship with the French who had declared Tahiti a French protectorate in 1842. The directors of the London Missionary Society, as well as the resident missionaries, were anxious to remove the Henry family from the islands but recognised that they were only "punishing a parent for the errors of his child. Mr Henry...has pained his mind. He declines removing, in consequence of his health."

In 1847 Henry, aged 77, celebrated his jubilee as a missionary.

== Last years ==
In April 1847 James Shepherd died at Kissing Point, leaving property for his daughter, Ann, and her children. William and Ann Henry, with four of their ten children, returned to Sydney in February 1848 and settled at their "Retreat". Here, at last, the family achieved a quiet respectability denied them in their pioneering years in the Pacific. Financial difficulties did not disappear. Ann and her two youngest daughters, Sophia and Henrietta, had inherited from James Shepherd a block of land in George Street, Sydney. Regular mortgages on this land, the first for A£700 in June 1857, provided capital until Sophia died unmarried in 1904. "The Retreat" was mortgaged in December 1858 for A£200 and repaid in full two years later.

William Henry continued to preach at St. Anne's and acted as school master until his death at Ryde aged 89 in April 1859, his body erect, his voice strong and his conversation animated to the last. His obituary in The Sydney Morning Herald declared him "a pioneer of civilisation and commerce as a teacher of the Christian faith, he maintained an unblemished reputation through all the trials of his long public life. The children of the southern islands ... will pay their homage to the memory of one who devoted his life to their welfare."

He was buried in St Anne's cemetery, not far from where he had preached the first service in the district 61 years earlier.

== Family ==
Henry's family life affected his reputation. He married, firstly, Sarah, in Sligo in October 1794. Their child, Sarah, was the first child born after the missionaries arrived at Tahiti in May 1797. The fourth child, William Ebenezer, was born in Australia, in December 1810 in "the house appointed for a school and chapel in the district called Eastern Farms or Kissing Point". Sarah the daughter married William Bland in 1817, but the marriage was not happy.

After Sarah's death in 1812, and leaving his children in Tahiti, Henry returned to Sydney in 1813 seeking a second wife. He chose Ann Shepherd, the 16-year-old daughter of his friend, James Shepherd of Kissing Point. William and Ann were married by the Reverend Samuel Marsden at Parramatta on 1 June 1813. Henry's conduct shocked some. The first of their ten children was born on the island of Mo'orea (Eimeo) in August 1814. Both of Ann's brothers visited her in Tahiti. James Shepherd joined them on the island of Mo'orea, in 1816, then joined the Church Missionary Society and became a missionary, in New Zealand. Isaac Shepherd came to Tahiti in 1818 with John Gyles, a missionary who had been sent to establish sugar cultivation and a mill on the island. They worked on the project for a year without success and Isaac returned to Sydney in late 1819. The Henry children were sent to Sydney for brief periods, the boys to serve apprenticeships and the girls to improve their "education, needlework and house keeping". Some of the children lived with other missionary families in Sydney. Five year old Josiah, their fifth child, was sent to live with his grandfather Shepherd at Kissing Point in 1827. Joseph Smith the coffee planter in 1835 married Elizabeth Henry (born 1816).

In the eyes of his colleagues in Tahiti and in Sydney, Henry's missionary achievements were overshadowed by the behaviour of the children of both his marriages. Brought up as Tahitian, speaking Tahitian as their first language, they mixed freely with native children, adopting their sexual and social habits, such as tattooing. The Henry children were regarded as social outcasts, the despair of missionary families in the islands and in Sydney where they were sent to learn European ways, accusations of drunkenness, idolatry and promiscuity filled reports to London. Several of the Henry boys turned to trade running guns, liquor, sandalwood and supplies around the islands. The exploits of Captain Samuel Pinder Henry, a son of Henry's first marriage, and Captain George Henry, eldest son of Ann's ten children, became part of the Pacific sea-farers' folklore.

== Notes ==
Attribution
