= David Edmonds (cricketer) =

New Zealand cricketer

Personal information
- Full name: David Baxter Edmonds
- Born: 10 November 1907; Auckland, New Zealand
- Died: 6 January 1950 (aged 42); Balmoral, Auckland, New Zealand
- Role: Wicket-keeper

Domestic team information
- Years: Team
- 1933/34–1946/47: Auckland

Career statistics
Competition	First-class
Matches	11
Runs scored	109
Batting average	8.38
100s/50s	0/0
Top score	28
Catches/stumpings	22/7
- Source: Cricinfo, 21 August 2021

David Edmonds (10 November 1907 – 6 January 1950) was a New Zealand cricketer. He played eleven first-class matches for Auckland as a wicket-keeper between 1933 and 1947.

In January 1950, while living in the Auckland suburb of Balmoral and working as a machinist, Edmonds was found at his home suffering from carbon monoxide poisoning. He was taken to hospital and died there a few hours later. His death was recorded as suicide.
