= Ilaijia Varani =

Fijian chief and missionary

Ratu Ilaijia Varani was a chief of Viwa, Bau Island, Tailevu in Fiji during the mid-to-late 19th century.

== Career ==
Varani was an ally and aide to Ratu Seru Epenisa Cakobau. He converted to Christianity on Good Friday, March 21, 1845. His island of Viwa served as a sanctuary for persecuted Christians during this period.

Varani is noted for protecting early Christian missionaries, including Reverend John Hunt and William Lyth, in the early 19th century. His support is believed to have played a significant role in the spread of Christianity in Fiji.

== Memorials ==
One of the four houses at Lelean Memorial School, a Methodist Church of Fiji-run school located in the Davuilevu compound in Nausori, Fiji, is named after Varani.
