= James Elder (missionary) =

Scottish missionary in Australia

James Elder (1772 – March 12, 1836) was a Scottish-born missionary and later settler in colonial Australia, affiliated with the London Missionary Society (LMS). Originally from Edinburgh, Elder trained as a stonemason and taught at the Edinburgh Gratis Sabbath School Society before entering missionary service through the Edinburgh Missionary Society. He was later transferred to LMS to serve in the South Pacific. In preparation for his missionary work, Elder undertook basic medical training and was ordained alongside John Youl in Portsea in 1800.

In May, 1800, Elder departed for the Pacific aboard the Royal Admiral, a long-distance mail ship of the East India Company transporting approximately 300 convicts to the penal colony at Sydney. Following the death of the ship's surgeon during the voyage, Elder assumed responsibility for treating the sick on board. He arrived in Sydney later that year, where he began preaching at Brickfields and ministered to condemned convicts, attracting significant local interest. Elder reached Tahiti on July 10, 1801.

He spent several years working among the islanders before departing Tahiti on February 1, 1808, aboard the Seringapatam. He arrived in Port Jackson in March. On July 19, 1808, he married Mary Smith (1788–1861) at St. John’s Church in Parramatta, with the governor’s permission. Mary was the daughter of a Baulkham Hills settler.

Elder returned to Tahiti with his wife on October 25, 1808 onboard the Perseverance. Mary suffered a severe mental health crisis following the suicide of the captain who had declared romantic feelings for her.

Due to ongoing conflict on the island of Tahiti, Elder and other missionaries relocated to Huahine on November 10, 1808, aboard the Perseverance. His missionary service concluded when he left Huahine with fellow missionaries on October 26, 1809, aboard the Hibernia, arriving in Sydney Cove on February 17, 1810, after a stopover in the Fiji islands. The missionaries addressed a letter to Governor Macquarie, informing him of their arrival and circumstances, and requesting, as British subjects in distress, the privileges of settlers in the Colony of New South Wales.

Tensions with fellow missionaries led Elder to abandon plans to resume work in Tahiti. He briefly farmed near Baulkham Hills before settling in Parramatta. There, he transitioned into secular life, working as a baker and grocer while continuing to offer medical assistance when needed. The couple had ten children. By 1819, Elder had constructed the Elder House, later known as the Woolpack Inn, and became involved in bookselling and local construction. He contributed to early architectural development in Parramatta. In 1823, he hosted early Presbyterian gatherings in his home, although they were discontinued after several months. Elder later became embroiled in church disputes, notably opposing the formation of Scots Church alongside government official William Wemyss. Despite criticism from peers for his rigid demeanor, Elder maintained an active role in public affairs. He was appointed to Parramatta’s grand jury in 1826 and remained engaged in civic and charitable work until his death on March 12, 1836. His widow, Mary, lived until September 1861.
