= John Davies (missionary) =

John Davies (11 July 1772 – 19 August 1855) was a Welsh missionary and school teacher. His family were from the Llanfihangel-yng-Ngwynfa area of Montgomeryshire. Having received some education in one of "Madam" Bridget Bevan's schools, he became a teacher in Thomas Charles of Bala's circulating schools at Llanrhaeadr-ym-Mochnant, Machynlleth and Llanwyddelan. He heard of the work established by the London Missionary Society in Tahiti through his Calvinistic Methodist connections, and volunteered to join the work. He left for the island in May 1800 and remained there for most of the next 55 years. He married twice: Sophia Browning in 1810 (who died following childbirth in 1812) and Mary Ann Bicknell in 1824 (who died in 1826). Davies became superintendent of a school at Papara, established by the London Missionary Society. He also encouraged the setting up of mission schools in Fiji.

His published works include a dictionary and grammar of the Tahitian language, a translation of substantial portions of the New Testament and Psalms, Brown's Catechism, the Westminster Catechism, the Pilgrim's Progress, and a number of smaller works. His spelling book, printed in London in 1810, was the first book to be published in Tahitian. He also wrote a History of the Tahitian Mission, 1799-1830 (Cambridge, 1962).
