= New Hebrides =

1906–1980 Anglo-French condominium in the South Pacific

Coordinates: 16°38′S 168°01′E

New Hebrides Condominium Condominium des Nouvelles-Hébrides (French)
- 1906–1980
- Anthem: "God Save the King" "La Marseillaise"
- Capital: Port Vila
- Common languages: English; French; Bislama
- Government: Condominium of the United Kingdom and France
- Monarch of the United Kingdom
  - 1906–1910: Edward VII
  - 1952–1980: Elizabeth II
- President of France
  - 1906–1913: Armand Fallières
  - 1974–1980: Valéry Giscard d'Estaing
- Resident Commissioners
  - 1906–1907: Ernest Goldfinch Rason (British Zone)
  - 1978–1980: Andrew Christopher Stuart (British Zone)
  - 1906–1908: Charles Bord (French Zone)
  - 1978–1980: Jean-Jacques Robert (French Zone)
- Legislature: Representative Assembly (1975–1980)
- History
  - Established: 20 October 1906
  - Independence: 30 July 1980
- Currency: New Hebrides franc, Australian dollar
- ISO 3166 code: NH
Preceded by	Succeeded by
Anglo-French Joint Naval Commission	Vanuatu

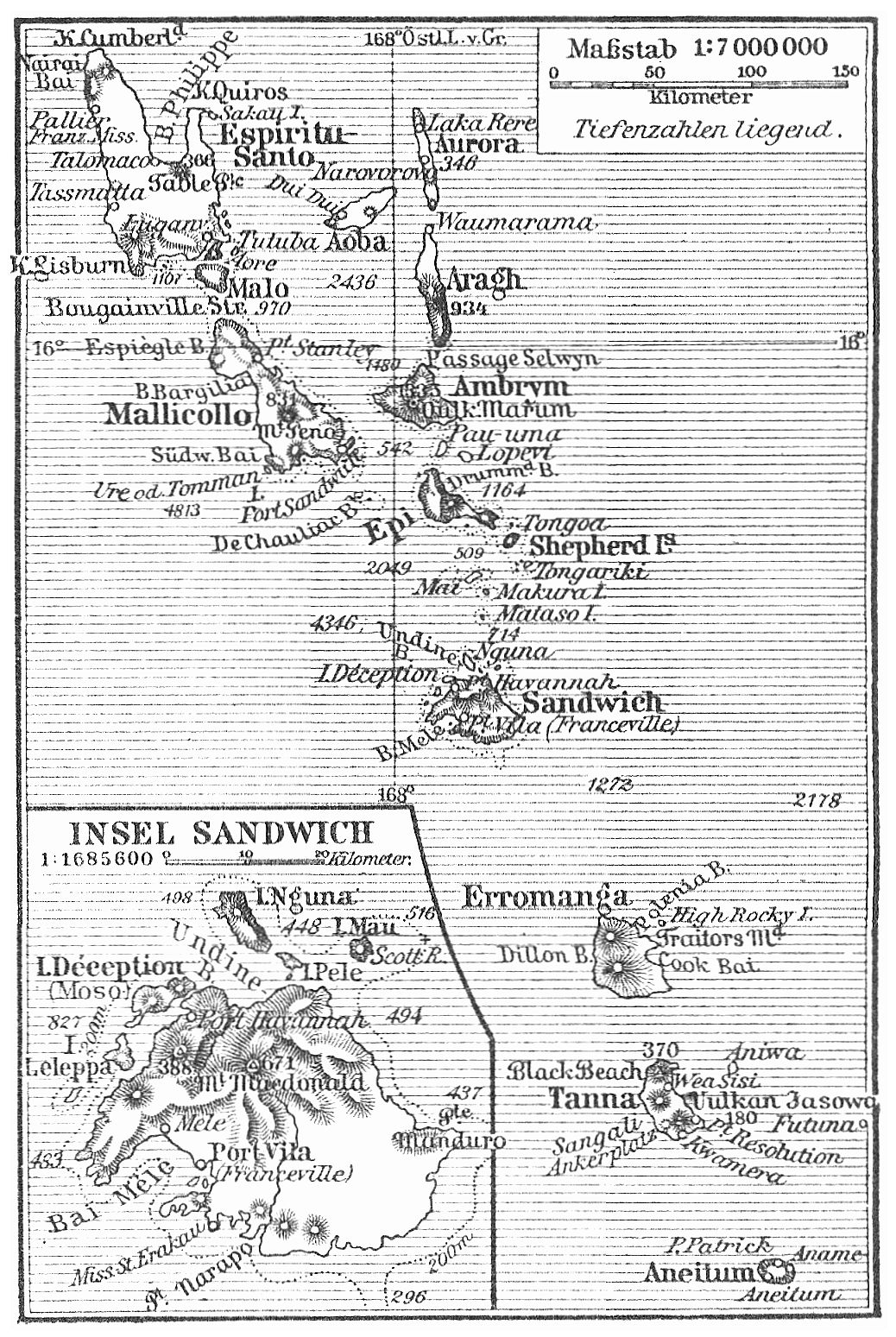
Map of the New Hebrides, 1905

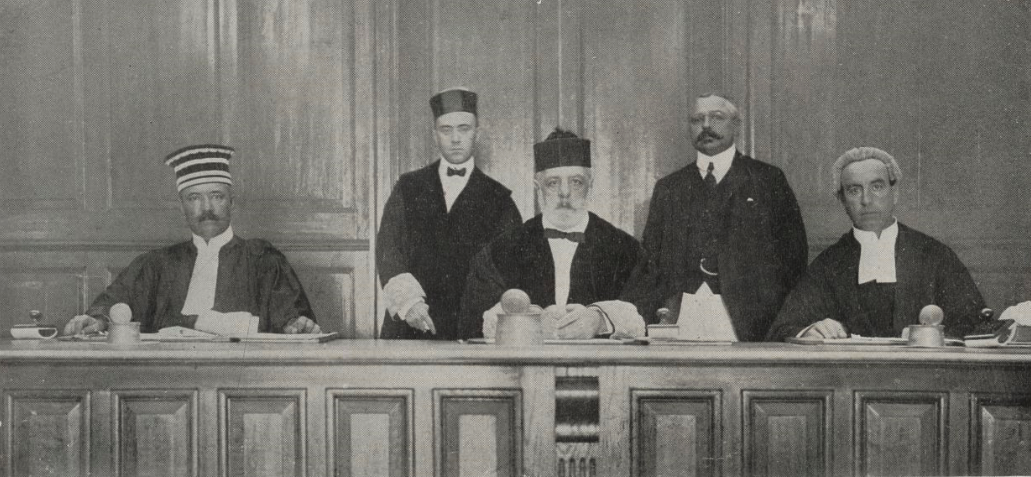
The Joint Court in 1914

New Hebrides, named after the Hebrides in Scotland by Captain James Cook in 1774, was the colonial name for the island group in the South Pacific Ocean that is now Vanuatu. The New Hebrides Condominium (French: Condominium des Nouvelles-Hébrides), which followed the governance of the islands under the Anglo-French Joint Naval Commission (1887–1889 and 1890–1906), lasted from 1906 until 1980, when New Hebrides gained its independence as the Republic of Vanuatu.

== History ==
The northern islands of the archipelago had been settled by 1300 BCE by people of the Lapita culture, from Melanesian islands to the west. People of Polynesian origin followed, around 3,000 years before the first Europeans arrived in 1606, in a Spanish expedition led by Portuguese navigator Pedro Fernandes de Queirós. French navigator Louis Antoine de Bougainville followed in 1768, and the islands were named by Captain James Cook in 1774.

During the 19th century, British, French, Australian, and German settlers settled in the territory of the New Hebrides. In 1878, the United Kingdom and France declared all of the New Hebrides to be neutral territory. In 1887, the Anglo-French Joint Naval Commission took charge of the territory. On 9 August 1889, Franceville, an area around present-day Port Vila, declared itself an independent commune under the leadership of elected mayor/president Ferdinand-Albert Chevillard, and with its own red, white and blue flag with five stars. It became one of the first self-governing nations in recorded history to practice universal suffrage without distinction of sex or race. However, the new government was soon suppressed, and by June 1890, Franceville as a commune was reported to have been "practically broken up", with the Naval Commission resuming control. The two countries eventually signed an agreement making the islands an Anglo-French condominium (French: Condominium des Nouvelles-Hébrides) that provided for joint sovereignty over the archipelago with two parallel administrations, one British, one French, under the "Protocol of 1906", which became effective in 1907.

In 1902, a group of Australian settlers established Annandale, an agricultural settlement on the southern coast of Santo named in honour of Presbyterian missionary Joseph Annand. The settlement was supported by the Australian government, which sought to use it to influence the British government's negotiations for the islands' future with France. At its peak, Annandale had over 50 residents, making it one of the largest European settlements in the islands, but the settlement population's dropped to 20 residents by 1904. Three of the remaining settlers were murdered in 1908, sparking a punitive expedition by HMS Prometheus.

In 1903, Australian geologist Douglas Mawson was appointed geologist to an expedition to the New Hebrides. His report, "The Geology of the New Hebrides", published in the Proceedings of the Linnean Society of New South Wales in 1905, was one of the first major geological works of Melanesia.

During the Second World War, approximately 10,000 Ni-Vanuatu men served in the Vanuatu Labor Corps, a labour battalion of the United States Armed Forces. They provided logistical support to the Allied war effort during the Guadalcanal campaign. The mass participation of Ni-Vanuatu men in the Labor Corps had a significant effect on the John Frum movement, giving it the characteristics of a cargo cult.

The Anglo-French New Hebrides Condominium lasted until 1980, when New Hebrides gained its independence as the Republic of Vanuatu.

== Politics and economy ==
The New Hebrides was a rare form of colonial territory in which sovereignty was shared by two powers, Britain and France, instead of being exercised by just one. Under the condominium there were three separate governments – one French, one British, and one joint administration that was partially elected after 1975, when elections to the New Hebrides Condominium Representative Assembly took place.

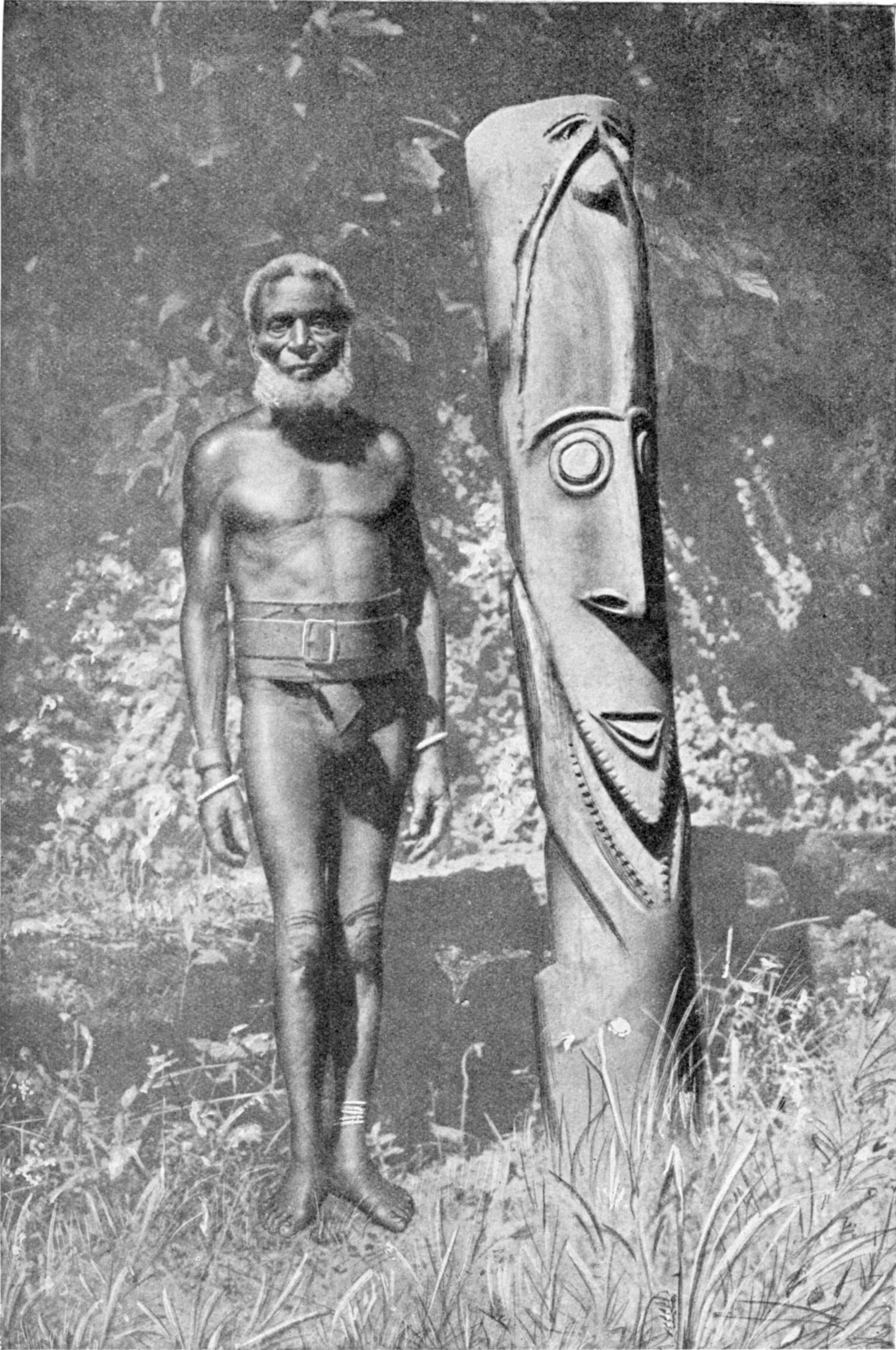
Melanesian woodcarver on Ambryn, c. 1920.

The French and British governments were called residencies, each headed by a resident appointed by the metropolitan government. The residency structure greatly emphasised dualism, with both consisting of an equal number of French and British representatives, bureaucrats and administrators. Every member of one residency always had an exact mirror opposite number on the other side whom they could consult. The symmetry between the two residencies was almost exact.

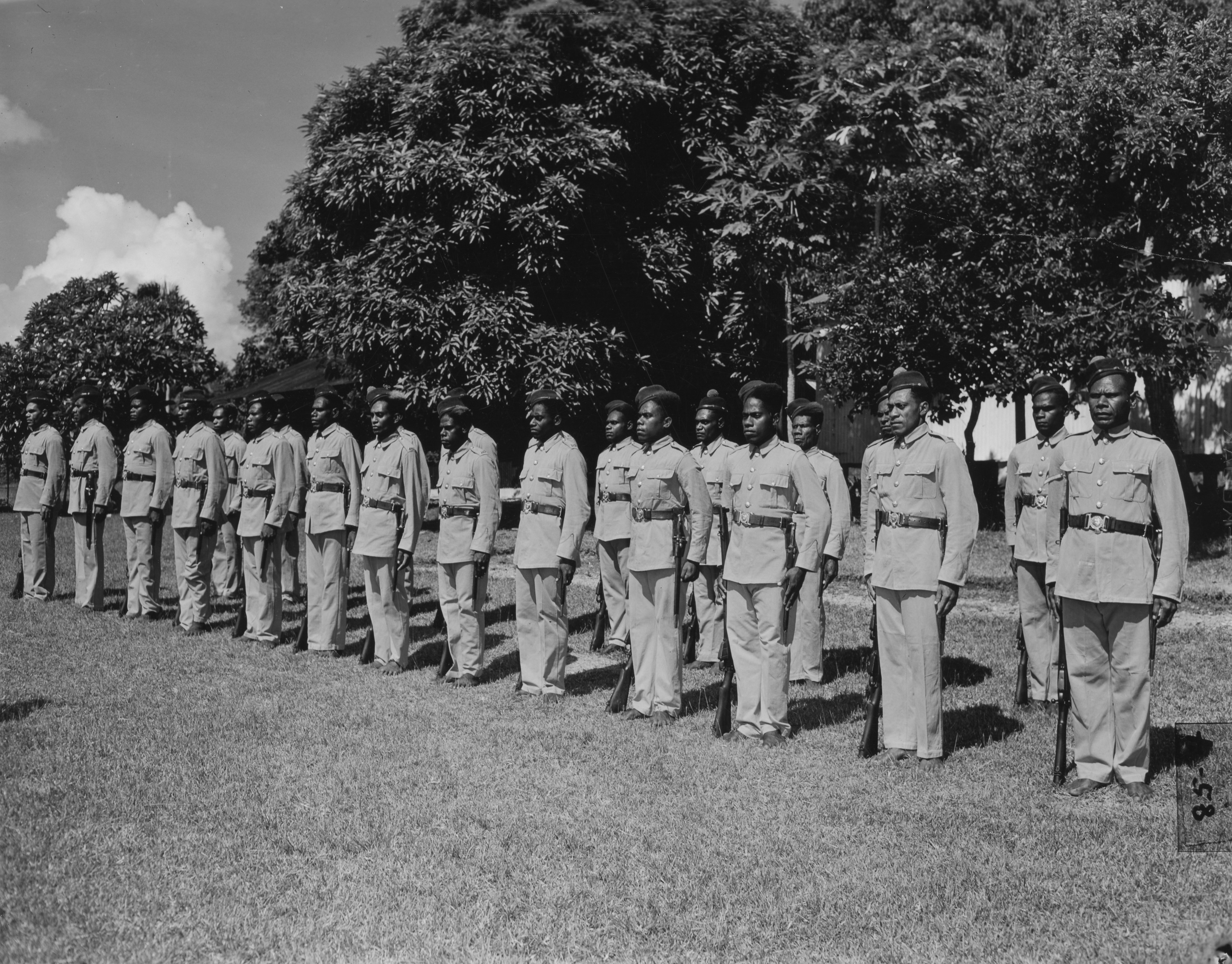
British native police, 1944

The joint government consisted of both local and European officials. It had jurisdiction over the postal service, public radio station, public works, infrastructure, and censuses, among other things. The two main towns of Luganville and Port Vila also had town councils, but these did not have a great deal of authority.

While initial settlers were predominantly British living in Australia, the late 19th century saw an influx of French. Within a few decades, there were twice as many French on the islands as there were British, prompting a multitude of petitions to cede power to either the French or the British. Despite this, the two nations came together to form a condominium, a specialised form of government where both nations would have all of their own administrations and jointly rule the islands. The only place they came together was in the Joint Court. As Mander describes, "The Joint Court was the key to the situation and much was to depend upon it….Three judges–one British, one French, and the third nominated by the King of Spain–were to comprise the court." This meant convictions in court were chosen based on either British or French law, depending on the circumstances.

Other than the Joint Court, everything existed in pairs. "Cynics called the Condominium 'the Pandemonium', as the dual administration produced amazing duplication. There were two police forces with their own laws, including road laws, two health services, two education systems, two currencies, and two prison systems." Additionally, there were separate British and French governments, which meant two immigration policies, two courts (apart from the Joint Court), and two corporation laws. Inhabitants of the islands were given the choice of which government they wanted to be ruled by. As Miles put it, "The result was an inevitable clash of foreign policy and colonial mentality."

Local people could choose whether to be tried under the English common law or the French civil law. Visitors could choose which immigration rules to enter under. Nationals of one country could set up corporations under the laws of the other. In addition to these two legal systems, a third Native Court existed to handle cases involving Melanesian customary law. There was also a Joint Court, composed of British and French judges. The President of the Joint Court was appointed by the King of Spain until 1939 when the post was abolished after the retirement of the last President, partly due to the abolition of the Spanish monarchy in 1931.

There were two prison systems to complement the two court systems. The police force was technically unified but consisted of two chiefs and two equal groups of officers wearing two different uniforms. Each group alternated duties and assignments.

Language was a serious barrier to the operation of the naturally inefficient system, as all documents had to be translated once to be understood by one side, then the response translated again to be understood by the other, though Bislama creole represented an informal bridge between the British and the French camps.

The condominium was not beneficial for Ni-Vanuatu, as they were "...officially stateless. [For instance,] To travel abroad, they needed an identifying document signed by both the British and the French resident commissioners." Inevitably, that led to discontent across the islands, with a multitude of revolutionary groups forming in an attempt to create agency and self-government for themselves.

== Chief ministers ==
New Hebrides became internally self-governing in January 1978.

Chief ministers of the New Hebrides Condominium

- George Kalsakau, November 1977 – December 1978
- Gérard Leymang, December 1978 – November 1979
- Walter Lini, November 1979 – July 1980

== See also ==
- British Empire
  - Territorial evolution of the British Empire
- French colonial empire
  - List of French possessions and colonies
- List of resident commissioners of the New Hebrides
- Coconut War
- Postage stamps and postal history of Vanuatu
- History of Vanuatu
- Efate, the most populous island
- Naval Advance Base Espiritu Santo
