= Henry Nott =

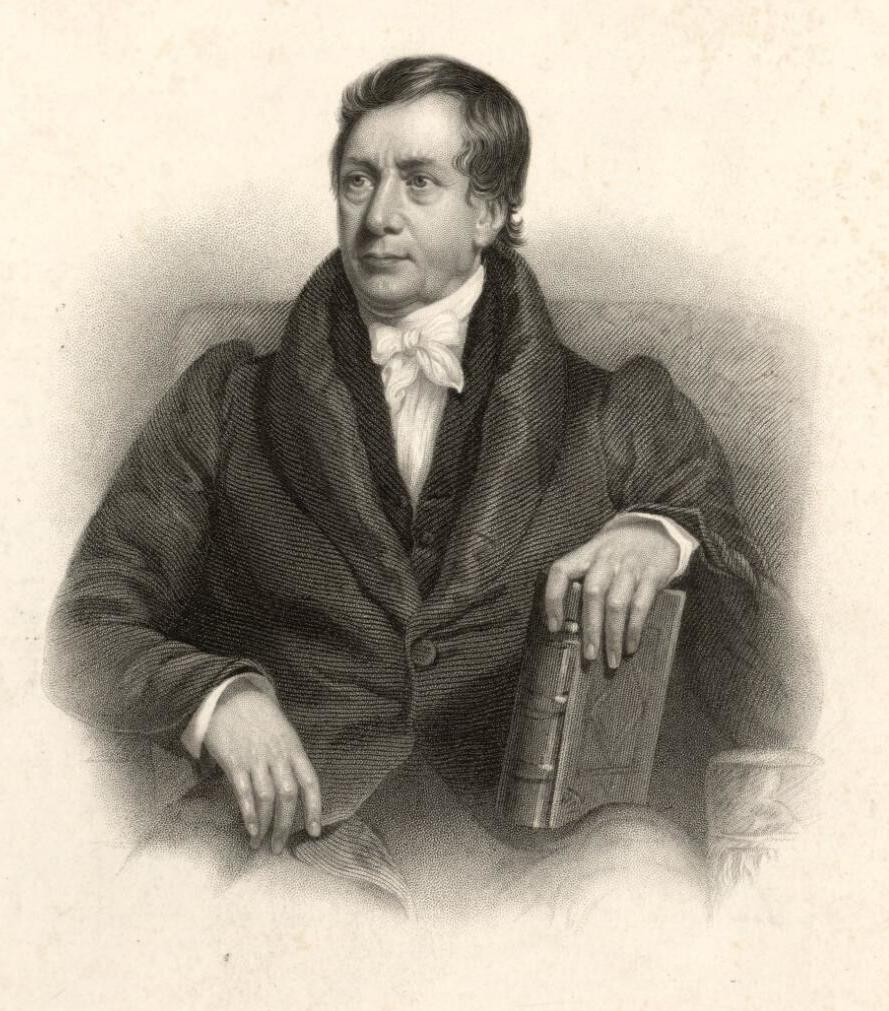
- Missionary to Tahiti
- Born: 1774; Bromsgrove, England
- Died: 2 May 1844; Paparā, Tahiti

Henry Nott (1774–1844) was a British Protestant Christian missionary who lived and worked in Tahiti, in the Society Islands in Polynesia.

== Life ==
Henry Nott was born in Bromsgrove, Worcestershire in 1774. He was one of the first missionaries sent out by the London Missionary Society, arriving in Tahiti aboard the mission ship Duff in 1797. He had been a bricklayer by trade and the mission did not prepare these missionaries well for their situation in Tahiti. The Duff took a year to return to England. Then, when it was loaded with supplies and returning to Tahiti, it was taken by a French ship, Britain and France being at war during the reign of Napoleon.

During the five-year wait for resupply, several of his fellow missionaries deserted, died, or seemed to go mad. Nott continued on, building a relationship with the new king, Pomare II. Eventually the king was converted, and encouraged the building of a chapel which was dedicated on 25 July 1813. The king's baptism, the first on the island, took place on 16 May 1819.

Nott learned the language and worked with Pomare II on translating the Bible into the Tahitian language. Missionary historian Ruth A. Tucker describes Nott as the primary translator of the Bible into Tahitian, writing:

But for the perseverance of Henry Nott, the work in Tahiti would no doubt have been abandoned.

He married a newly arrived missionary from Britain, but she was not content in Tahiti and died within two years.

Nott returned to England only twice during his 47 years overseas. He died on 2 May 1844.

== Popular Biography ==
Joyce Reason. The Bricklayer and the King: Henry Nott of the South Seas. London, Edinburgh House, 1938.
