= Isaac Ironside =

Isaac Ironside (17 September 1808 – 20 August 1870) was an English Chartist and socialist politician, whose activities were centred in Sheffield.

== Early years ==
Born near Masbrough, Rotherham, Ironside grew up in Sheffield, the son of Samuel Ironside, a Wesleyan lay preacher, and Mary Bradbury. On both sides of the family there were roots in the Independent Church in Masbrough – Mary's grandfather Isaac Bradbury was well known as an "Old Jacobin". Isaac's younger brother Samuel Ironside travelled as a Methodist missionary to New Zealand, where he became a supporter and signatory of the Treaty of Waitangi. Isaac, meanwhile, moved into politics. He began work in the foundries and undertook studies in his spare time.

Soon after marrying in the 1820s, Ironside moved to New Harmony, Indiana, Robert Owen's utopian colony. However, the colony was not a success, and the couple returned to Sheffield. In 1833, he joined his father's new accountancy business, and by the 1840s came to run it.

== Chartism ==
A supporter of Chartism, Ironside joined the Sheffield Political Union in 1831 and worked as the campaign secretary for the Radical candidate Thomas Asline Ward, who stood for Sheffield in the 1832 general election, but was narrowly defeated. In 1833, he became a founder member of Sheffield's Mechanics Institute. He increasingly became a leading figure in Sheffield Chartism, and spoke alongside Ebenezer Elliott at a mass meeting in Paradise Square in 1838. However, with the defeat of the first Chartist petition, the local movement was split between supporters of and opponents of violence, and he increasingly stayed away from meetings.

During the late 1830s, Ironside took up phrenology, but soon abandoned it, as it was "not capable of rigid demonstration", and because many of its practitioners made implausible claims about it.

== Conflict ==
In 1839, poet James Montgomery had Ironside removed from his post as honorary secretary of the Institute after Ironside placed eight books dealing with socialism on the shelves. Montgomery also claimed that Ironside had encouraged subversion by opening a coffee room. Instead, Ironside worked with Owen, proposing agrarian communities, and opening a Hall of Science in Sheffield. He wrote a polemic attacking John Brindley and despite moving away from Owen, founded a Workers' Educational Institute at the Hall of Science in 1848.

== Power ==
In 1846, Ironside was elected to Sheffield Town Council representing Ecclesall, where he founded the Central Democratic Association to raise socialist and Chartist demands. By 1849, this grouping had grown to 22 members and was able to force the creation of a health committee and the construction of a model farm on broadly Owenite principles at Hollow Meadows. Utilising Joshua Toulmin Smith's localist ideas, he set up a system of "wardmote" committees where any local citizen could influence council policy. With their support, he ensured that Sheffield's streets were paved and underground sewers were laid during the 1850s. He also supported women's suffrage, and encouraged Anne Knight to found the Sheffield Female Political Association.

At the Town Council meeting of 14 January 1848, Ironside gave an antisemitic speech in response to a proposal to express the Council's support for the removal of bar on Jews becoming MPs.

== Later years ==
In 1851, Ironside founded the Sheffield Free Press, becoming an outspoken supporter of David Urquhart, and leading support for Toulmin Smith's candidature for Sheffield at the 1852 general election. In 1856, he corresponded with Karl Marx. He retained his seat on the council until 1868. He died in 1870 and was buried in Sheffield General Cemetery.

Isaac and his wife Elizabeth had five daughters: Emma (1835), Frances (1841), Una (1845), Kate (1850), and Lilian (1852).
