= Masbrough =

Suburb of Rotherham, South Yorkshire, England

Coordinates: 53.430°N 1.373°W

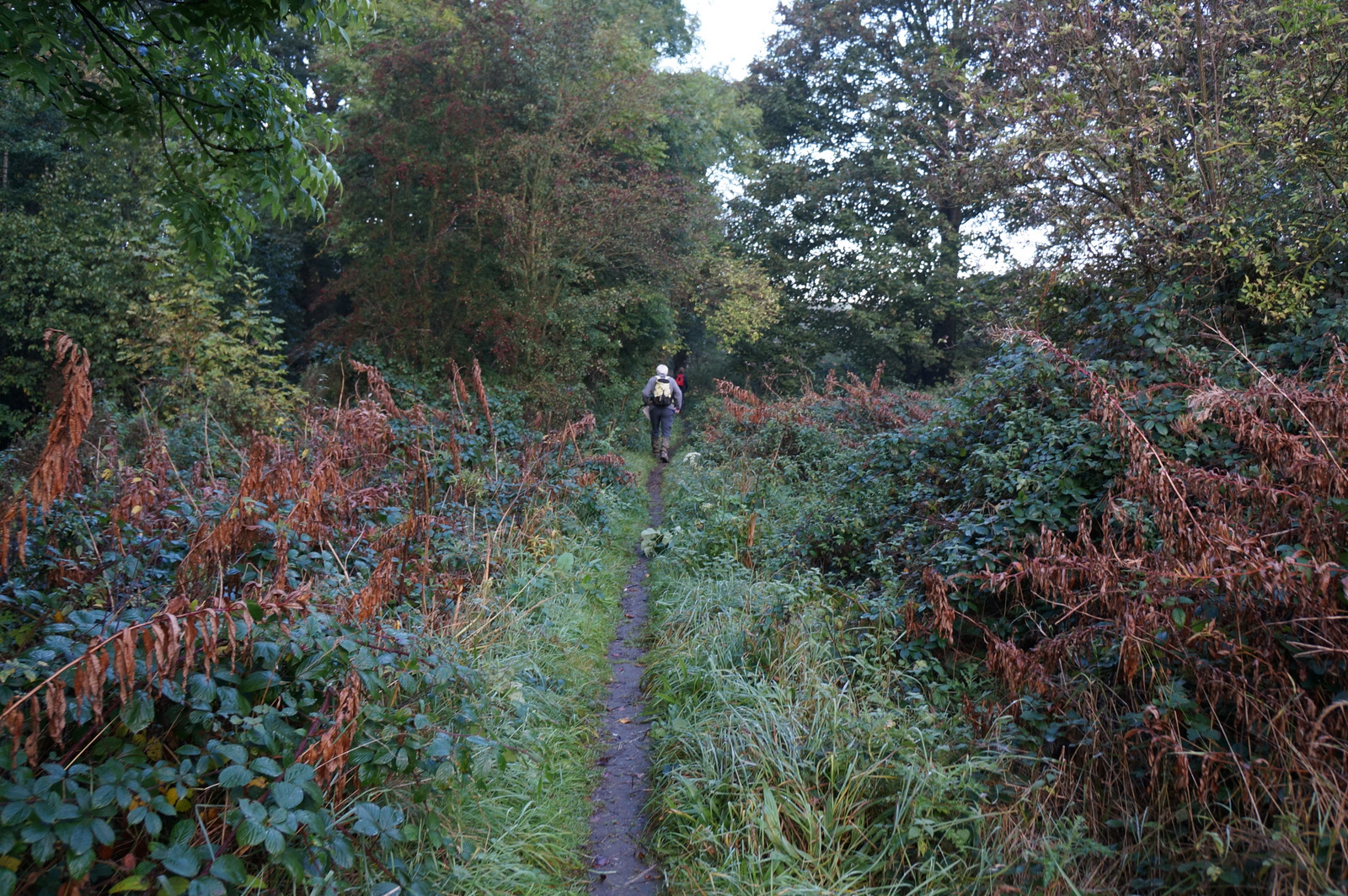
- The tree and fern-surrounded section of the Rotherham Round Walk, a rural trail, within Masbrough

- Location within South Yorkshire
- Area: 5.78 km^{2} (2.23 sq mi)
- Population: 13,262 (2011 census, including the Richmond Park neighbourhood and part of Kimberworth)
  - Density: 2,294/km^{2} (5,940/sq mi)
- Metropolitan borough: Rotherham
- Metropolitan county: South Yorkshire
- Region: Yorkshire and the Humber
- Country: England
- Sovereign state: United Kingdom
- Post town: ROTHERHAM
- Postcode district: S60
- Dialling code: 01709
- Police: South Yorkshire
- Fire: South Yorkshire
- Ambulance: Yorkshire
- UK Parliament: Rotherham

Masbrough is a suburb of Rotherham, South Yorkshire, England. It was named as the west of Rotherham by the middle of the Industrial Revolution, namely that part on the left bank of Don. Historically part of the West Riding of Yorkshire, it is in the Metropolitan Borough of Rotherham, centred 0.5 miles (0.8 km) west of Rotherham town centre. Much of the suburb falls within the Rotherham West ward of Rotherham MBC.

== History and landmarks ==
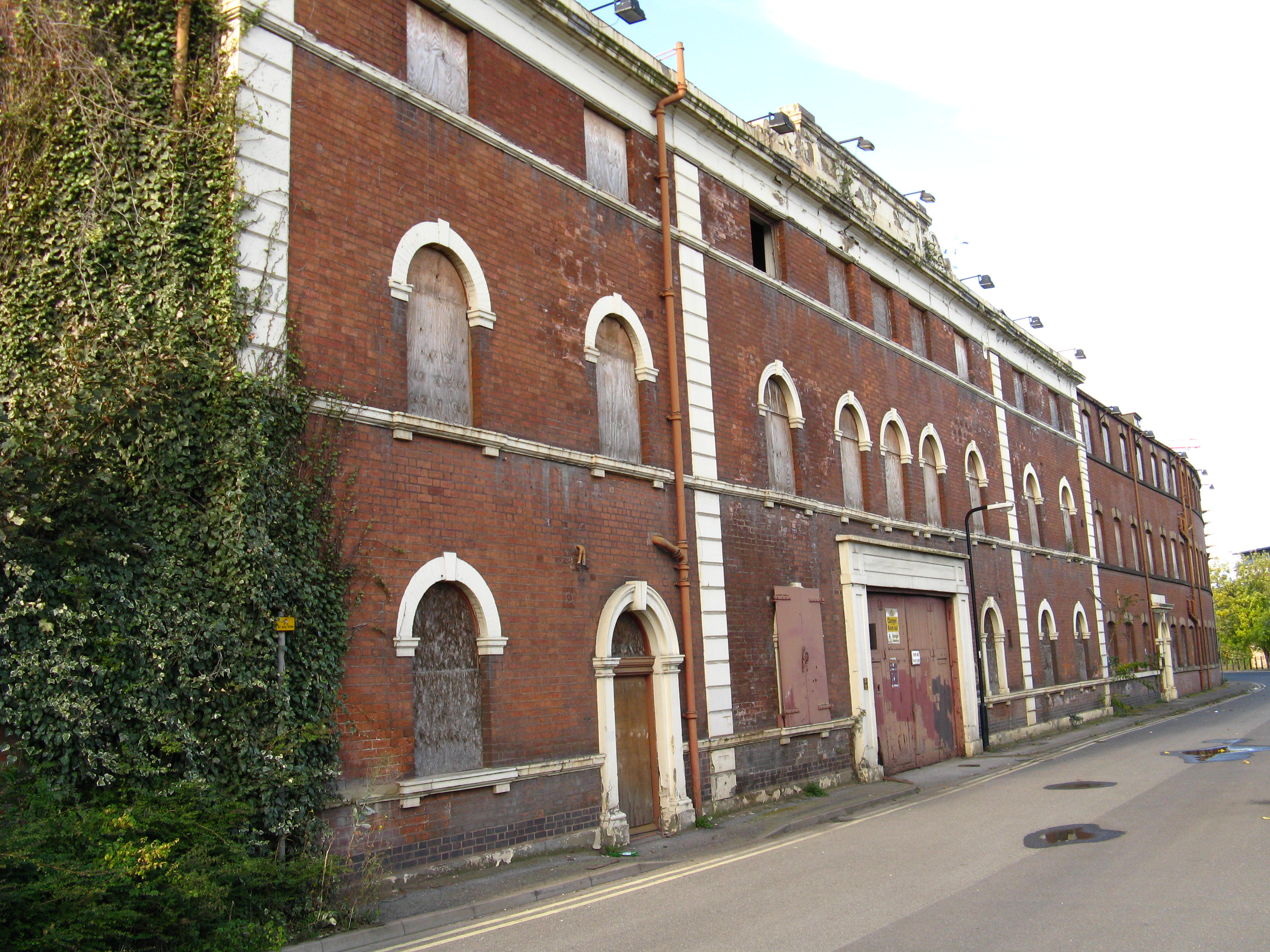
This was the Guest & Chrimes valve works. Replaced by an office block by the River Don, this tall red brick building with arched windows stood before 2010, built in the nineteenth or early 20th century.

Part of its land in the north lay within the manor of Kimberworth, the other contiguous western suburb of Rotherham today – Masbrough did not feature in the Domesday Book survey of 1086.

Masbrough, in the township of Kimberworth, parish and union of Rotherham... ½ a mile (N. W.) from Rotherham; containing nearly 5000 inhabitants. This place forms part of the suburbs of the town of Rotherham, with which it is connected by [a bridge, the Chapel of Our Lady of Rotherham Bridge] of five pointed arches over the river Don, on the central pier of which is an ancient chapel of elegant design, [then] used as a prison. It is nearly of equal extent...and has long been distinguished as the [site] of numerous works connected with the manufactures of the district; of these, a few years since, the principal were the extensive foundry and iron-works of the late Samuel Walker, Esq., in which, during the war, immense quantities of cannon and ordnance of the largest calibre were cast, and subsequently, various iron bridges, including that of Southwark in London. Since the establishment here of a station of the Midland railway, by which... sheep and cattle are sent to Manchester, Liverpool, and other towns, a wonderful increase has taken place in the value of landed property; and the facility of [travel to] distant parts... by that line... promises to render this a principal seat of manufacture. It also derives benefit from the Sheffield and Rotherham branch railway. A large tract of land, forming the estate of Benjamin Badger... has been surveyed and laid out in lots for building; and several streets, intersecting each other at right angles, and forming direct approaches from Rotherham and the neighbourhood to the railway station, have been marked out. A spacious hotel for the accommodation of passengers by the railway, and some handsome dwelling-houses, have been built; and a great increase has been made in the number of manufacturing establishments: there are potteries, glass-works, chemical works, a timber-yard, and several forges and foundries. The Independent College, noticed under the head of Rotherham, is... here; and a Roman Catholic chapel has been built. – Extract from A Topographical Dictionary of England, Samuel Lewis (publisher), 1848

A commemorative memorial to 50 victims of a boat disaster at Masbrough in 1841 by Edwin Smith of Sheffield is in All Saints Church, Rotherham.

=== Legacies ===
A large memorial to a celebrated iron magnate, Samuel Walker, stands behind the site once occupied by the 1760 Independent chapel (with a date stone of 1777), the Walker Mausoleum. After being closed as a place of worship, the chapel became a carpet showroom Allens of Rotherham, but was destroyed by fire in 2012. It is connected by a short foot subway and Chapel Walk to all the historic buildings in central Rotherham. There were further memorials and statues within the chapel building. The chapel's statue to Jonathan Walker (died 1807), who was at the heart of the iron industry that led to the local area's development, depicts the man leaning on a truncated column "with head in hand".

In 1862, the Midland Iron Company was the scene of an industrial disaster, when one of the boilers exploded, killing nine people. No trace of this company exists as it became the site of a new bus depot in 1982.

== Schools ==
The Masbrough community is served by Thornhill and Ferham primary schools. Secondary schooling is provided by Winterhill School in nearby Kimberworth.

== Places of worship ==
Masbrough has six places of worship: St Bede's Roman Catholic Church, St Paul's Church of England Church, and Rotherham Assemblies of God, now known as Liberty Church, Rotherham, and the Jamia Mosque in College Road and two other mosques for Sunni Muslims.

== Demography ==
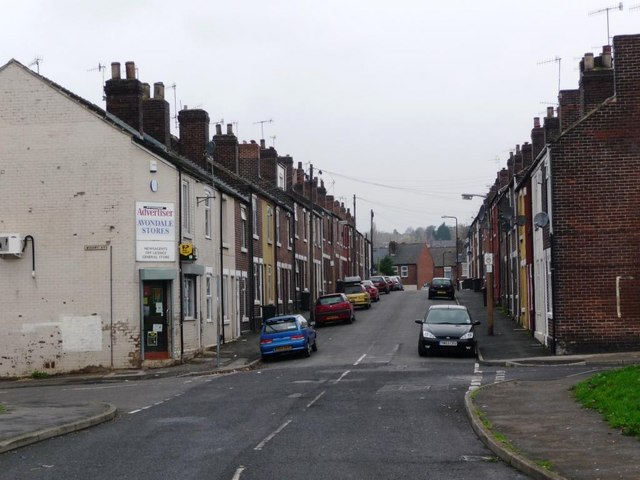
Avondale Street and adjoining streets

The electoral ward largely co-extensive with Masbrough has lately been named Rotherham West. Respondents in this ward to the 2011 Census mainly identified themselves ethnically as White British, White European or British Pakistani.

People in this ward born in non-UK EU countries numbered approximately 5 per cent of the population: 572 (of which Ireland 35). Residents born in South Asia numbered 591, the Middle East 77, Zimbabwe 69, and Central and Western Africa 60. The dense minorities communities in the ward are due to the affordability of local housing.

2011 Published Statistics: Population, home ownership and extracts from Physical Environment, surveyed in 2005
Output area	Homes owned outright	Owned with a loan	Socially rented	Privately rented	Other	km² green space (includes two outlying farms, central parks and playing fields)	km² roads	km² water	km² domestic gardens	km² domestic buildings	km² non-domestic buildings	Usual residents	km²
'Rotherham West' Ward	1,464	1,616	1,391	864	124	2.93	0.62	0.07	0.86	0.30	0.31	13,262	5.78

== Sport ==
Masbrough is the home of Millmoor, the former stadium of Second Division football club, Rotherham United and less than 0.5 miles (0.8 km) west from its replacement across the riverside nature reserve.

== Transport ==
Rotherham Masborough railway station closed, having been opened in 1840 by the North Midland Railway as an interchange with the Sheffield and Rotherham Railway. Its services were diverted in 1987 to a new Rotherham Central railway station on a parallel line 600 m to the east.

The M1 motorway passes, at junction 34, Meadowhall, the far western neighbourhood of Masbrough, which is associated with Kimberworth.

== Notable people ==
- Josiah Beckwith (1734 – before May 1800), antiquary, settled in Masbrough.
- Ebenezer Elliott (1781–1849), the "Corn Law Rhymer", was born in Masbrough. Though a mill owner, he agitated against the Corn Laws for the hardship they caused the poor.
- Sandy Powell (1900–1982), radio comedian ("Can you hear me, Mother?"), attended White's School in Masbrough.
- Ryan Sampson (born 1985), television actor (Plebs, After You've Gone), was born in Masbrough.
- Samuel Walker (1779–1851), ironmaster, lived at Masbrough Hall and owned an ironworks that flourished until the end of the Napoleonic Wars. He was MP for Aldeburgh from 1818 to 1820.
- Edward Williams (1750–1813), a Welsh-born co-founder of the London Missionary Society, became the pastor of Masbrough Independent Chapel in 1794.
