= Democratic Association =

Democratic Association may refer to:

- Central Democratic Association, UK
- London Democratic Association
- All India Democratic Women's Association
