= Ebenezer Elliott =

English poet and Corn Laws opponent (1781–1849)

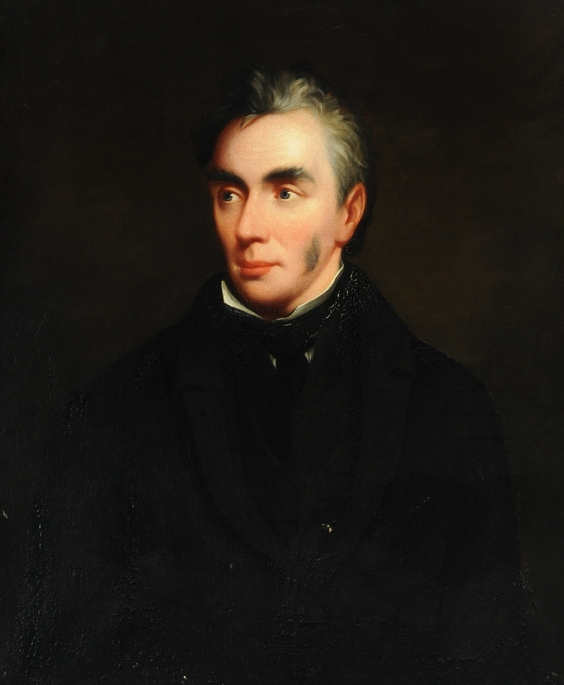
The younger Ebenezer Elliott

Ebenezer Elliott (17 March 1781 – 1 December 1849) was an English poet, known as the Corn Law rhymer for his leading the fight to repeal the Corn Laws, which were causing hardship and starvation among the poor. Though a factory owner himself, his single-minded devotion to the welfare of the labouring classes won him a sympathetic reputation long after his poetry ceased to be read.

== Early life ==
Elliott was born at the New Foundry, Masbrough, in the parish of Rotherham, Yorkshire. His father, known as "Devil Elliott" for his fiery sermons, was an extreme Calvinist and a strong Radical. He was engaged in the iron trade. His mother suffered from poor health, and young Ebenezer, although one of eleven children, of whom eight reached maturity, had a solitary and rather morbid childhood. At the age of six he contracted smallpox, which left him "fearfully disfigured and six weeks blind". His health was permanently affected, and he suffered from illness and depression in later life.

He was first educated at a dame school, then at the Hollis School in Rotherham, where he was "taught to write and little more", but was generally regarded as a dunce. Moving to Thurlstone in 1790, he attended Penistone Grammar School. He hated school and preferred to play truant, spending his time exploring the countryside, observing the plants and local wildlife. At the age of 14 he began to read extensively on his own account, and in his leisure hours he studied botany, collected plants and flowers, and was delighted by the appearance of "a beautiful green snake about a yard long, which on the fine Sabbath mornings about ten o'clock seemed to expect me at the top of Primrose Lane." When he was 16 he was sent to work at his father's foundry, where he received only a little pocket money in lieu of wages for the next seven years.

== Early works ==
In a fragment of autobiography printed in The Athenaeum (12 January 1850) he says that he was entirely self-taught, and attributes his poetic development to long country walks undertaken in search of wild flowers, and to a collection of books, including the works of Edward Young, Isaac Barrow, William Shenstone and John Milton, bequeathed to his father. His son-in-law, John Watkins, gave a more detailed account in "The Life, Poetry and Letters of Ebenezer Elliott", published in 1850. One Sunday morning, after a heavy night's drinking, Elliott missed chapel and visited his Aunt Robinson, where he was enthralled by some colour plates of flowers from James Sowerby's English Botany. When his aunt encouraged him to make his own flower drawings, he was pleased to find he had a flair for it. His younger brother, Giles, whom he had always admired, read him a poem from James Thomson's "The Seasons", which described polyanthus and auricular flowers, and this was a turning point in Elliott's life. He realised he could successfully combine his love of nature, and his talent for drawing, by writing poems and decorating them with flower illustrations.

In 1798, aged 17, he wrote his first poem, "Vernal Walk", in imitation of James Thompson. He was also influenced by George Crabbe, Lord Byron and the Romantic poets and Robert Southey, who later became Poet Laureate. In 1808 Elliott wrote to Southey asking for advice on getting published. Southey's welcome reply began a correspondence over the years that reinforced his determination to make a name for himself as a poet. They only met once, but exchanged letters until 1824, and Elliott declared it was Southey who had taught him the art of poetry.

Other early poems were Second Nuptials and Night, or the Legend of Wharncliffe, which was described by the Monthly Review as the "Ne plus ultra of German horror and bombast". His Tales of the Night, including The Exile and Bothwell, were considered to be of more merit and brought him commendations. His earlier volumes of poems, dealing with romantic themes, received much unfriendly comment, and the faults of Night, the earliest of these, were pointed out in a long and friendly letter (30 January 1819) from Southey to the author.

Elliott had married Frances (Fanny) Gartside in 1806, and they eventually had 13 children. He invested his wife's fortune in his father's share of the iron foundry, but the affairs of the family firm were then in a desperate condition, and money difficulties hastened his father's death. Elliott lost everything and went bankrupt in 1816. In 1819 he obtained funds from his wife's sisters, and began another business as an iron dealer in Sheffield. This prospered, and by 1829 he had become a successful iron merchant and steel manufacturer.

== Political activity ==
When made bankrupt, Elliott had been homeless and out of work, facing starvation and contemplating suicide. He always identified with the poor. He remained bitter about his earlier failure, attributing his father's pecuniary losses and his own to the operation of the Corn Laws, whose repeal became the greatest issue in his life.

Elliott became well known in Sheffield for his strident views on changes that would improve conditions for both manufacturers and workers, but was often disliked on this account by his fellow entrepreneurs. He formed the first society in England to call for reform of the Corn Laws: the Sheffield Mechanics' Anti-Bread Tax Society founded in 1830. Four years later, he was behind the establishment of the Sheffield Anti-Corn Law Society and the Sheffield Mechanics' Institute. He was also very active in the Sheffield Political Union and campaigned vigorously for the Reform Act 1832 (2 & 3 Will. 4. c. 45). He was later active in Chartist agitation, acting as the Sheffield delegate to the Great Public Meeting in Westminster in 1838, and chairing the meeting in Sheffield where the Charter was introduced to local people. However, Elliott withdrew from the Sheffield organisation after the Chartist Movement advocated the use of violence.

The strength of his political convictions was reflected in the style and tenor of his verse, earning him the nickname of "the Corn Law Rhymer", and making him internationally famous. After a single long poem, "The Ranter", in 1830, came the Corn Law Rhymes in 1831. Inspired by a hatred of injustice, the poems were vigorous, simple and full of vivid description and campaigned politically against the landowners in the government who stifled competition and kept the price of bread high. They also heeded the dreadful conditions endured by working people and contrasted their lot with that of the complacent gentry. He went on to publish a three-volume set of the growing number of his works in The Splendid Village; Corn-Law Rhymes, and other Poems (1833–1835), which included "The Village Patriarch" (1829), "The Ranter", "Keronah" and other pieces.

The Corn Law Rhymes marked a shift away from the long narratives that had preceded them, towards verses for singing that would carry a wider message to the labouring class. Several of the poems indicate the tune for them (including the Marseillaise) and one late poem at least, "They say I'm old because I'm grey", was set to music by a local composer. He followed up the Rhymes of 1831 with the Corn Law Hymns of 1835, which are even more belligerent and political in spirit:

The locustry of Britain
Are gods beneath the skies;
They stamp the brave into the grave;
They feed on Famine's sighs.

His poems by then were being published in the United States and in Europe. The French magazine Le Revue des deux Mondes sent a journalist to Sheffield to interview him. The Corn Law Rhymes were initially thought to be written by an uneducated Sheffield mechanic, who had rejected conventional Romantic ideals for a new style of working-class poetry aimed at changing the system. Elliott was described as "a red son of the furnace", and called "the Yorkshire Burns" or "the Burns of the manufacturing city". The French journalist was surprised to find Elliott a mild man with a nervous temperament.

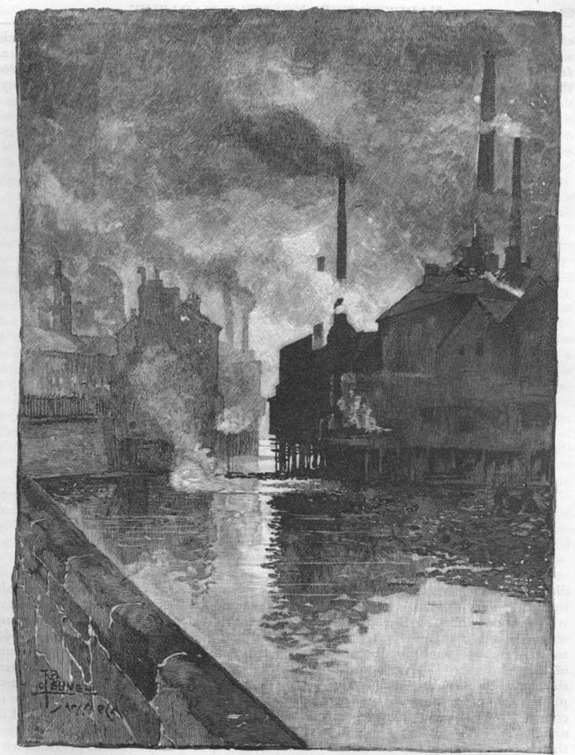
Elliott's “cloud-rolling Sheffield”

One of Elliott's last poems, "The People's Anthem", first appeared in Tait's Edinburgh Review in 1848. It was written for music and usually sung to the tune "Commonwealth".

When wilt thou save the people?
Oh, God of mercy! when?
Not kings and lords, but nations!
Not thrones and crowns, but men!
Flowers of thy heart, oh, God, are they!
Let them not pass, like weeds, away!
Their heritage a sunless day!
God! save the people!

The final refrain parodies the British national anthem, God Save the Queen, and demands support for ordinary people instead. Despite its huge popularity, some churches refused to use hymn books which contained it, as it could also be seen as a criticism of God. In his notes on the poem, Elliott demanded that votes be given to all responsible householders. The poem remained a favourite for many years, and in the 1920s it was suggested it had qualified Elliott to be Poet Laureate of the League of Nations.

The words of "The People's Anthem" eventually entered the American Episcopal hymn-book. From that source it was included, along with others, in the rock musical Godspell (1971), in which it was retitled "Save the People", with a new musical score.

== Literary friendships ==
Elliott's relations with like-minded writers remained close, particularly with James Montgomery and John Holland, both of whom espoused other humanitarian causes. He was also sympathetic to labouring-class poets and is recorded as being over-generous in his praise of the fledgling writing that they brought to show him. For reasons of propriety, Mary Hutton addressed herself to Mrs Elliott, although she also addresses the poet himself in one stanza of the poem of condolence she wrote on the death of two of their children. The Elliott family were subscribers to her next collection, which is dedicated to Mrs Elliott, in thanks for her sympathy and help.

Another writer with whom he became friendly when he moved to Sheffield in 1833 was the former shoemaker Paul Rodgers, who for a time became secretary of the Sheffield Mechanics' Institution. He was later to head the campaign to raise subscriptions for a statue in Elliott's memory and wrote a memoir of him after his death. He also relates there how Elliott befriended the lecturer and writer Charles Reece Pemberton and helped to raise a subscription to support him when his health broke down. The two went on a walk together in 1838, after which Elliott recorded his impressions of "Roch Abbey", praising and characterising his companion. Elliott paid Peterson a further tribute in his poem "Poor Charles" after Pemberton's death two years later.

Elliot's "Song" beginning "Here's a health to our friends of reform", mentions several poets among the political agitators for the Reform Act 1832, the passing of which it celebrates. Among the surnames enumerated is that of Thomas Asline Ward (1781–1871), leader of the Sheffield Political Union and editor of the Sheffield Independent. Also present is Reverend Jacob Brettel, a Unitarian minister in Rotherham who had published the poem "A Country Minister" (1825), and Sketches in verse, from the historical books of the Old Testament (1828). A further reference is to "Holland the fearless and pure". This was not John Holland but George Calvert Holland (1801–1865), to whom Elliott's long early poem "Love" was dedicated. Of labouring-class origin, he had educated himself to become a Sheffield surgeon. Elliott's first attempt at a sonnet was also inscribed "To G. C. Holland, M.D."; it was followed by a light-hearted "Epistle to G. C. Holland, Esq., M.D." on women's emancipation.

In the case of Thomas Lister (1810–1888) from nearby Barnsley, we are granted insight into an example of poetic dialogue. Elliott wrote two poems entitled "To Thomas Lister". One is a stirring exhortation to take a high theme in his poetry, the other a humorous exercise in hexameters marking the measure as "in English undignified, loose, and worse than the worst prose", in response to verses sent him by Lister. In 1837 Lister addressed a sonnet to Elliott "From the summit of Ben Ledi" while on a walking tour in Scotland.

== Final years and death ==
In 1837 Elliott's business suffered from the trade recession of that year, but he still had enough money to retire in 1841 and settle on land he had bought at Great Houghton, near Barnsley. There he lived quietly, seeing the Corn Laws repealed in 1846, and dying in 1849, aged 68. He was buried in the churchyard of All Saints Church, Darfield.

Earlier in his life, Elliott had written "A Poet's Epitaph", setting out the poetic programme for which he wished to be remembered:

Stop, Mortal! Here thy brother lies,
The Poet of the Poor
His books were rivers, woods and skies,
The meadow and the moor,
His teachers were the torn hearts’ wail,
The tyrant, and the slave,
The street, the factory, the jail,
The palace – and the grave!

News of his death brought poetic tributes: the Chartist George Tweddell (1823–1903) devoted three sonnets to him. Another Chartist who had recently become his son-in-law, John Watkins (1809–1858), described the poet's last moments in "On The Death of Ebenezer Elliott". Still another tribute with the same title came from the labouring-class poet, John Critchley Prince, in his "Poetic Rosary" (1850) Though honouring him as "No trifling, tinkling, moon-struck Bard" and "The proud, unpensioned Laureate of the Poor", it also acknowledged the elemental violence of his writing. The American poet John Greenleaf Whittier's poem "Elliott", on the other hand, is as forceful as the Englishman had been, forbidding the capitalist "locust swarm that cursed the harvest-fields of God" to have a hand in his burial:

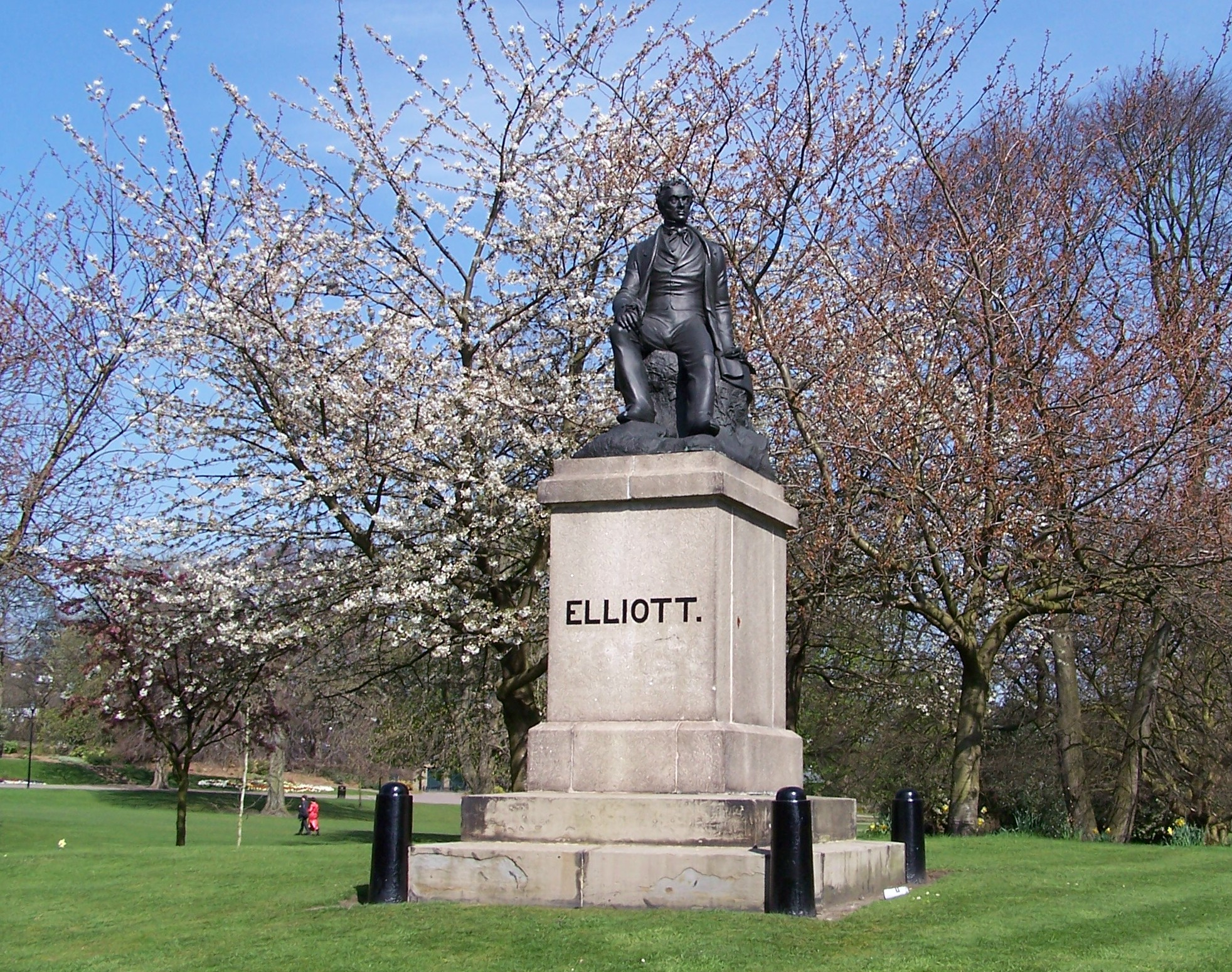
Statue of Ebenezer Elliott, Weston Park

Then let the poor man's horny hands
Bear up the mighty dead,
And labor's swart and stalwart bands
Behind as mourners tread.
Leave cant and craft their baptized bounds,
Leave rank its minster floor;
Give England's green and daisied grounds
The poet of the poor!

News of a monument to the poet to be erected in 1854 was greeted by a tribute from Walter Savage Landor to "The Statue of Ebenezer Elliott by Neville Burnard, (ordered by the working men of Sheffield)", celebrating the poet and praising the city for its enterprise, in a muscular poem of radical force. Once the bronze statue was in place in Sheffield market place, the blade-maker Joseph Senior (1819–1892) made it the subject of an unrhymed sonnet, "Lines on Ebenezer Elliott's Monument". Hailing the "sullen pile of hard-won toilers' pence", and equally sceptical of the work of "moon-struck bards", he addressed the poet as one who "by song more hungry Britons fed/ Than all the lyric sons that ever sang".

A long prose account of Elliott had appeared two years before his death in Homes and Haunts of the Most Eminent British Poets by William Howitt (1792–1879). Howitt had visited Elliott in 1846 to interview him for the article, where he praised the depictions of nature in Elliott's earlier poems rather than the rant of his political work. After his death, Elliott's obituary appeared in the Gentleman's Magazine in February 1850. Two biographies also appeared that year, one by John Watkins and another, The Life, Character and Genius of Ebenezer Elliott, by January Searle (George Searle Phillips). Two years later, Searle followed his book up with Memoirs of Ebenezer Elliott, the Corn Law Rhymer. A new edition of Elliott's works by his son Edwin appeared in 1876.

== Legacy ==
Paul Rodgers gave the opinion that Elliott "has been sorely handled by the painters and engravers.... The published portraits convey scarcely any idea at all of the man." Of those that remain, two have been attributed to John Birch, who also painted other Sheffield worthies. One shows him seated with a scroll in his left hand and spectacles dangling from the right. The other has him seated on a boulder, clasping an open book in his lap, with the narrow valley of Black Brook in the background. This spot above the River Rivelin was a favourite of Elliott's, and he is said to have carved his name on a boulder there. A drawing of Elliott by the Scottish artist Margaret Gillies is now in the National Portrait Gallery, London. She had accompanied William Howitt in 1847 when he visited the poet for another interview, and her work was reproduced to illustrate it in Howitt's Journal. Another seated portrait, book in lap, "may be a better picture", thought Rodgers, "but is still less like him."

Elliott is seated on a rock in Neville Burnard's statue of him, which was also thought a poor likeness. In its issue on 22 July 1854, The Sheffield Independent reported that "Many of the persons in Sheffield who have a vivid remembrance of the features of Ebenezer Elliott will feel disappointed that, in this case, the sculptor had not given a more exact similitude of the man as he lived", but goes on to surmise that this is meant to be a "somewhat idealised representation of the Corn Law Rhymer". In 1875, the work was removed from the city centre to Weston Park, where it remains.

The statue figures no more clearly in John Betjeman's poem "An Edwardian Sunday, Broomhill, Sheffield". "Your own Ebenezer", he apostrophizes, "Looks down from his height/ On back street and alley/ And chemical valley", which he certainly does not. The poet's final city dwelling in 1834–1841 was in Upperthorpe, not Broomhill, and bears a blue plaque today. Furthermore, the inscription on the pedestal reads simply "Elliott", with no mention of his given name. This is noted, among others, by the Sheffield poet Stanley Cook (1922–1991) in his tribute to the relocated statue. "It was not this dog's convenience wrote the poems", he comments, "But a man could be put together from passers-by" still angry at remaining injustices.

Rotherham, Elliott's birthplace, was slower to honour him. In 2009 a work by Martin Heron was erected on what is now known as Rhymer's Roundabout, near Rotherham. Entitled "Harvest", it depicts stylised ears of corn blowing in the wind, as an allusion to the "Corn Law Rhymes". That same year the new Wetherspoons pub in Rotherham was named 'The Corn Law Rhymer', and in March 2013 a blue plaque commemorating the poet was placed on the town's medical walk-in centre, marking the site of the iron foundry where he was born.

== Sources ==
- Keith Morris & Ray Hearne, Ebenezer Elliott: Corn Law Rhymer & Poet of the Poor, Rotherwood Press, Oct 2002, ISBN 0-903666-95-2
- The Life, Poetry and Letters of Ebenezer Elliott", by John Watkins, pub. 1850
- The Poetical Works of Ebenezer Elliott, the Corn-law Rhymer, Edinburgh 1840
- Historic England. "Grave of Ebenezer Elliot (Grade II) (1151163)". National Heritage List for England.
