= Central Democratic Association =

19th century English Chartist political party

The Central Democratic Association, also known as the Democratic Association or the Democrats, was a political party of Chartists which was prominent in Sheffield, England in the mid-nineteenth century.

== Establishment ==
Sheffield Town Council was constituted in 1843. While the town had one of the less restrictive electoral franchises, only ratepayers of three years standing were permitted to vote. Tenants of cottages, including many workers in the city, typically paid their rates indirectly through their landlords and were therefore not permitted to vote. This set-up had been unproblematic until the Council was founded, but was now of concern, as the registered voters were generally the wealthier residents. In 1843, only 5,584 people were registered to vote, and this had risen to 8,000 in 1845.

In 1846, a committee of Chartists in the city met to discuss the problem of voter registration. They decided to focus their campaign for registration by putting up two candidates in the November elections: Thomas Briggs, a farmer, in Brightside in the annual election, and Isaac Ironside, an accountant and former support of Robert Owen, in Ecclesall in a by-election held soon afterwards. Briggs was easily elected, while Ironside won narrowly on a record turnout: 397 votes to 317 for his Liberal rival. Voter registration was also up, reaching 11,500 people.

The Liberals dominated the council, and portrayed the Chartists as socialists, and Ironside as a demagogue. The Liberal press in the shape of the Sheffield Independent was initially supportive, but as the group gain success, became increasingly hostile.

In 1847, Ironside was re-elected in Ecclesall, along with another Chartist councillor. Other Chartists were elected in Brightside, St George's, St Philip's and Nether Hallam wards, and by the end of the year they formed a group of nine councillors. In addition, Richard Otley was elected in Ecclesall, but was unseated because he failed to meet the property qualification. This required councillors to have resources worth £1,000 or to occupy property with a rental value above £30 a year. As a result, the Chartist councillors were mostly shopkeepers and craftsmen, with a couple of surgeons and a farmer. This was not representative of their electorate.

The Chartists joined a campaign against Wilson Overend, a local magistrate accused of anti-trade union bias, and later in the year, initiated a campaign in support of former police constable George Bakewell who had been banished from the town by his superintendent after being accused of stealing a pair of trousers. This campaign was supported by Liberal members of the Watch Committee, annoyed that they had not been consulted.

== Policies and organisation ==
Chartist candidates had to give their broad support to Chartist goals, and in particular had to support universal male suffrage. The group was lightly whipped, a situation much criticised by the Sheffield Independent. Its main planks of policy were opposition to high civic salaries, and opposition to the Sheffield City Police, criticising its organisation and calling for a lower police rate. This was supported by the group's efficient administration of the Ecclesall board of highway surveyors.

In 1848, the Chartists won four of the six wards they contested, and by the end of the year had fifteen councillors. This rose to 22 the following year. They still opted not to run in the Park ward as they lacked registered supporters, but as the voter registration drive gained successes, in 1851 they came a close second to the Liberal, and in 1852 the Liberal association decided to avoid a repeat by adopting the Democrat candidate as official.

By this time, Ironside had become recognised as the leader of the group, and had persuaded the council to set up a health committee and to set up a model farm at Hollow Meadows.

The Chartists set up ward committees which met regularly and were responsible for selecting candidates, canvassing for them and for encouraging supporters to vote. These committees, known as "wardmotes" and open to all "burghers" (loosely defined as the skilled working classes), were inspired by Joshua Toulmin Smith's ideas. In 1851, Ironside formalised the network by launching the Sheffield Free Press as a party newspaper, followed by the Central Democratic Ward Association to co-ordinate the ward committees and decide borough-wide strategy. The Liberals largely failed to imitate these structures.

The Association allowed the wardmotes to select any candidate they chose, and while many were active Democrats, other radicals and independent Chartists were sometimes elected on to their slate. Ironside also saw the wardmotes as a venue for the resolution of local grievances. For example, they took up complaints against pollution and inadequate street maintenance, and even petty crimes. On one occasion, Ironside found five youths disturbing the peace and a wardmote passed a resolution calling for their parents to bring them before the body. When one youth attended the next meeting, he was reprimanded, while the body pressed for summons for the others. Members of the police force and other relevant bodies were also free to attend the wardmotes to justify their actions, and the Democrats were not universally critical of their actions.

By the 1840s, there was a general consensus in the city that a new Act of Parliament was needed to replace the Sheffield Improvement Act 1818. The council opposed the Public Health Act 1848 (11 & 12 Vict. c. 63) as centralising, adding expense and placing local boards under central governmental rather than local democratic control. The Chartists also opposed the additional property qualifications it introduced for voters and members of local boards, noting this would disenfranchise many of their supporters.

In 1851, Ironside seconded a council motion to call a public meeting to decide whether a local bill should be applied for that year. The meeting was little-attended, but supported the proposal. The bill claimed for Sheffield a wide range of powers, which would include the absorption of the Church Burgesses and the Town Trustees. These two measures were later dropped in order to minimise Parliamentary opposition. A public meeting was held in December and was dominated by Chartists. They opposed it on the grounds that it did not introduce a universal male franchise for the council, and that it would for the first time impose rates on housing with a rateable value of £7 or less per year. The meeting rejected the bill. Ironside also moved to oppose it, but his change in position alienated both colleagues in favour of it and members who had opposed it from the start.

== Later activities ==
By 1852, the group was sufficiently successful that six of their candidates were elected without opposition, and a further four in contests, giving the group a total of twenty-six councillors. However, not all councillors stuck to the party line, and as a result, a non-Democrat Mayor of Sheffield was elected.

During the 1850s, the Democrats were easily the main opposition on the council. Under their influence, from 1854 to 1857, the council annually voted a petition for parliamentary reform, and also petitioned the monarch on taxation, the Poor Law and county administration. Ironside was the chair of the city's Highways Board from 1852 to 1854, and led a campaign of street paving and laying deep sewers.

Ironside attempted to get Toulmin Smith to stand for the Parliamentary seat of Sheffield at the 1852 general election, but Smith refused. Ironside also became a shareholder in the Sheffield Consumers Gas Company, which engaged in a rivalry with the established Sheffield Gas-Light Company. Disputes over these actions led some former allies to turn against him. In 1853, two former allies organised a campaign against Ironside, and he lost his seat in Ecclesall. He subsequently took a seat in St George's, but in 1854, only two of the nine Democrat candidates were successful, and Ironside again lost his seat.

The Democrats lost influence on the council, but remained influential on the highway and vestry boards. In 1858, they opposed a new bill, sponsored by George Calvert Holland, essentially a more limited version of the 1851 proposal. Ironside's support for former diplomat David Urquhart lost him further support, and by the 1860s, the group was defunct.

== See also ==
- London Democratic Association
