= SPU =

SPU can stand for:

== Government ==
- Seattle Public Utilities, a public utility agency
- Sheffield Political Union, a former organisation established to campaign for Parliamentary Reform
- Socialist Party of Ukraine, a political party
- Statens pensjonsfond Utland (Norwegian, "Government Pension Fund Global"), one of two sovereigh wealth funds under the umbrella of the Government Pension Fund of Norway
- Suomen Pyöräilyunioni, the Finnish governing body of cycling

== Education ==
=== Organizations ===
- Saint Paul University System, Philippines
- Former US Student Peace Union

=== Universities ===
- Saint Paul University in Ottawa, Ontario, Canada
- Saint Peter's University in Jersey City, New Jersey
- Sankalchand Patel University in Visnagar, Gujarat, India
- Sardar Patel University in Vallabh Vidyanagar, Gujarat, India
- Seattle Pacific University in Seattle, Washington, United States
- Slobomir University in Slobomir, Republika Srpska, Bosnia and Herzegovina
- Sol Plaatje University in Kimberley, Northern Cape, South Africa
- Sripatum University in Chatuchak, Bangkok, Thailand
- Sulaimani Polytechnic University in Sulaymaniyah, Kurdistan Region, Iraq
- Syrian Private University in Damascus, Syria

== Technology ==
- Synergistic Processing Unit in the Sony-IBM-Toshiba cell microprocessor

== Transportation ==
- Split Airport, IATA airport code SPU
- Staplehurst railway station, National Rail code SPU
