= Walker Mausoleum =

Burial site in South Yorkshire, England

The Walker Mausoleum is located at 53.4313°N 1.3655°W on College Road, Rotherham, South Yorkshire, England. The sandstone mausoleum was built in the 1760s as the burial site for the families of Samuel and Aaron Walker and is now a Grade II listed building.

The mausoleum is located in the cemetery of Masbrough Chapel, which was founded by the Walker family, when they split from the Rotherham Methodist meeting in 1762. The cemetery also holds the graves of other local industrial families including the Oxleys, Beatsons, Clarks, and Habershons.

== Friends of Walker Mausoleum ==
In 2002, local citizens formed the Friends of Walker Mausoleum to help restore the structure, as well as fight for better access. In 2004, the group obtained funding from the Single Regeneration Budget towards restoration. In 2007, the group has also agreed access rights with the current owner.

As of November 2017 it appears that part of the site is up for sale
