= Joshua Walker (MP) =

British politician (1786–1862)

Joshua Walker (1786–1862) of Portland Place and Hendon Place, Middlesex, was a Member of Parliament for Aldeburgh in Suffolk, a pocket borough owned by his cousin Samuel Walker (1779–1851), MP, a notable ironmaster from Yorkshire.

== Origins ==
He was born on 28 September 1786, the son of Joshua Walker of Clifton House, near Rotherham in Yorkshire, the proprietor of an iron and steel works and of lead factories and founder of the Independent College at Rotherham. His mother was Susanna Need, a daughter of Samuel Need of Arnold, Nottinghamshire, a textile manufacturer.

== Marriage ==
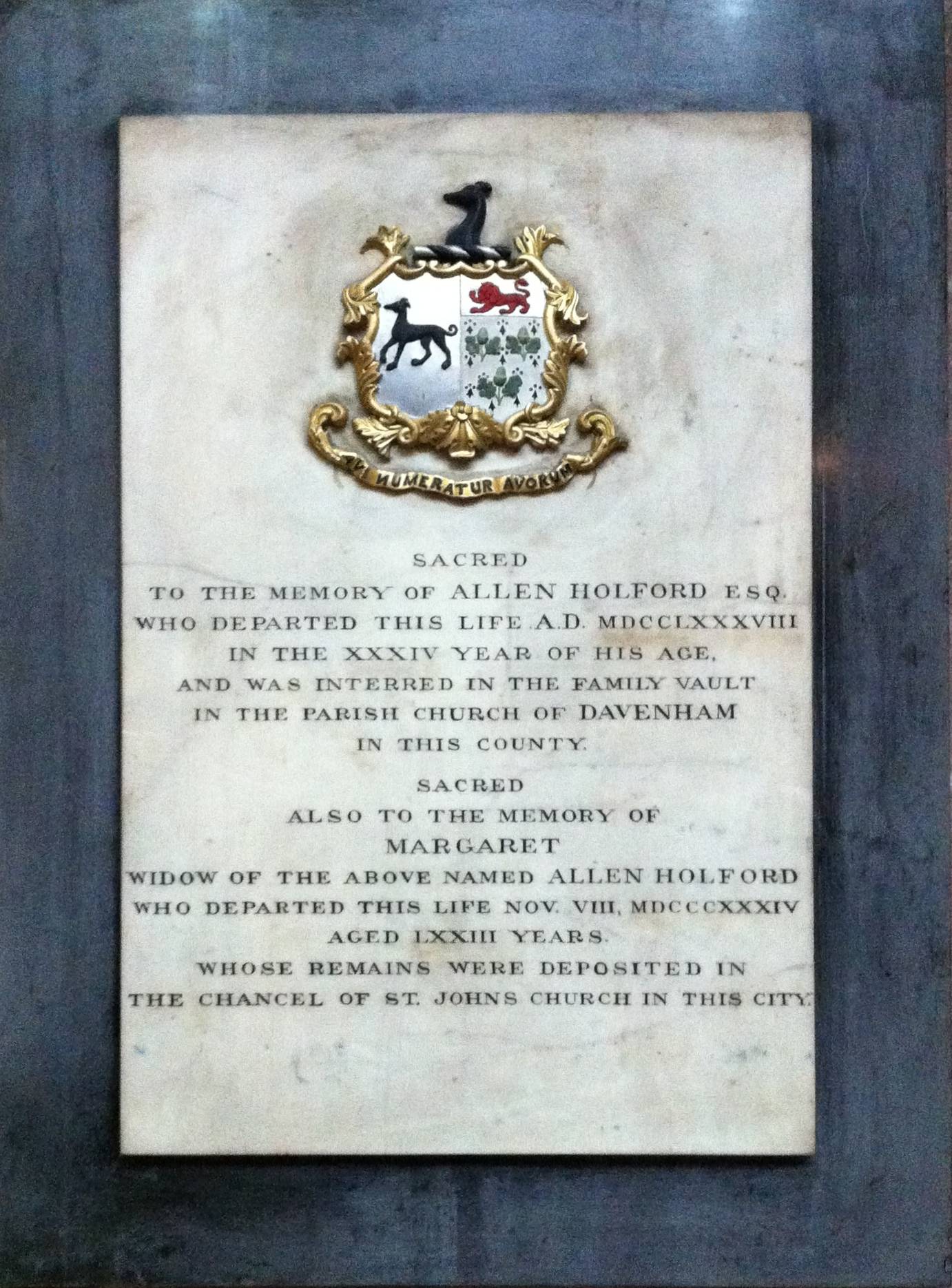
Memorial tablet to Allan Holford, Chester Cathedral

On 18 December 1805 he married Anna Maria Holford, a daughter and co-heiress of Allan Holford (1754–1788) of Davenham Hall in Cheshire, by his wife Margaret Wrench (d.1834), a daughter of William Wrench of Chester. By his wife he had six sons and 2 daughters.

== Sources ==
- Taylor, Lawrence, biography of Walker, Joshua (1786-1862), of Portland Place and Hendon Place, Mdx., published History of Parliament: the House of Commons 1790-1820, ed. R. Thorne, 1986 WALKER, Joshua (1786-1862), of Portland Place and Hendon Place, Mdx. | History of Parliament Online
