= Josiah Beckwith =

- Born: 1734
- Died: Unknown

Josiah Beckwith (born 1734) was an English antiquary.

== Life ==
Beckwith was born at Rothwell, near Leeds, on 24 August 1734, where his father, Thomas Beckwith, practised as on attorney. He was himself brought up to the same profession, and settled at Masbrough, near Rotherham. He married in August 1763 the eldest daughter and only surviving child of George D'Oxon, of Woodhead, in Cheshire, by whom he had two sons and four daughters, his wife's death taking place in 1788 at the age of 49. He seems to have been possessed of considerable natural powers, which, together with a large share of acquired knowledge, rendered him eminently fitted for antiquarian pursuits, for which he had a great taste. His name is known to the world in connection with the enlarged and improved edition of Blount's Fragmenta Antiquitatis, or Ancient Tenures of Land and Jocular Customs of some Manors, which he published in 1784, the first edition of this work having appeared in 1679. Speaking of Beckwith's edition, the Monthly Review (lxxiii. 459) remarks: "Few persons were better qualified for this business, and Mr. Beckwith has enriched this edition with many valuable improvements. He has subjoined many notes and observations, which have been communicated by some of the most respectable antiquaries of the present day". He left materials for a still further enlarged edition, which was published after his death by his son, who had an appointment in the mint. (Note: Gentlemen's Magazine I786, lvi. 285) (Note: Lowndes's Bibliographer's Manual, 1857, i. 221) (Note: British Museum Catalogue) (Note: Nichol's Literary Anecdotes, 1813, viii. 329–330.)
