= Samuel Ironside =

English missionary (1814–1897)

Samuel Ironside (9 September 1814–24 April 1897) was an English Methodist missionary in New Zealand, where he became a supporter and signatory of the Treaty of Waitangi. His brother Isaac Ironside remained in Sheffield, becoming a notable Chartist.

== Biography ==
Ironside was born in Sheffield, Yorkshire, England on 9 September 1814. After studying at a Wesleyan theological college, he left England to seek missionary work in the South Seas and arrived at Hokianga, New Zealand, in 1839. Within a few months, Ironside became fluent in the Maori language and was a witness to the Treaty of Waitangi which established British sovereignty over New Zealand. In the same year, he established what was called the Cloudy Bay Mission at Ngakuta Bay, at the head of Port Underwood, on 20 December 1840. During 1842 he established Wesleyan centres at Nelson and Motueka.

In 1843 his warnings about Maori unrest failed to avert a massacre at Wairua near Nelson. He sailed to the site of conflict to bury the dead.

Ironside then moved to Wellington and became active in public life. He was a member of the committee which arranged the Te Aro land purchase of 1844 and witnessed the Maori's signatures to the document. He advised the government on Maori affairs, at the same time retaining the respect and admiration of the Maori population.

He worked at Nelson from 1849 to 1854 and then at New Plymouth. After moving to Australia in 1857 he worked as a missionary in Sydney, Adelaide and later Melbourne, where he was also secretary to the Victorian foreign mission. He retired to Hobart in 1878 and remained there until his death.
