= London Missionary Society =

Religious concentration in the Congregationalist and Anglican Churches

- Abbreviation: L.M.S.
- Formation: 1795
- Founders: Edward Williams
- Dissolved: 1966
- Merger of: Council for World Mission
- Type: Mission society
- Headquarters: London

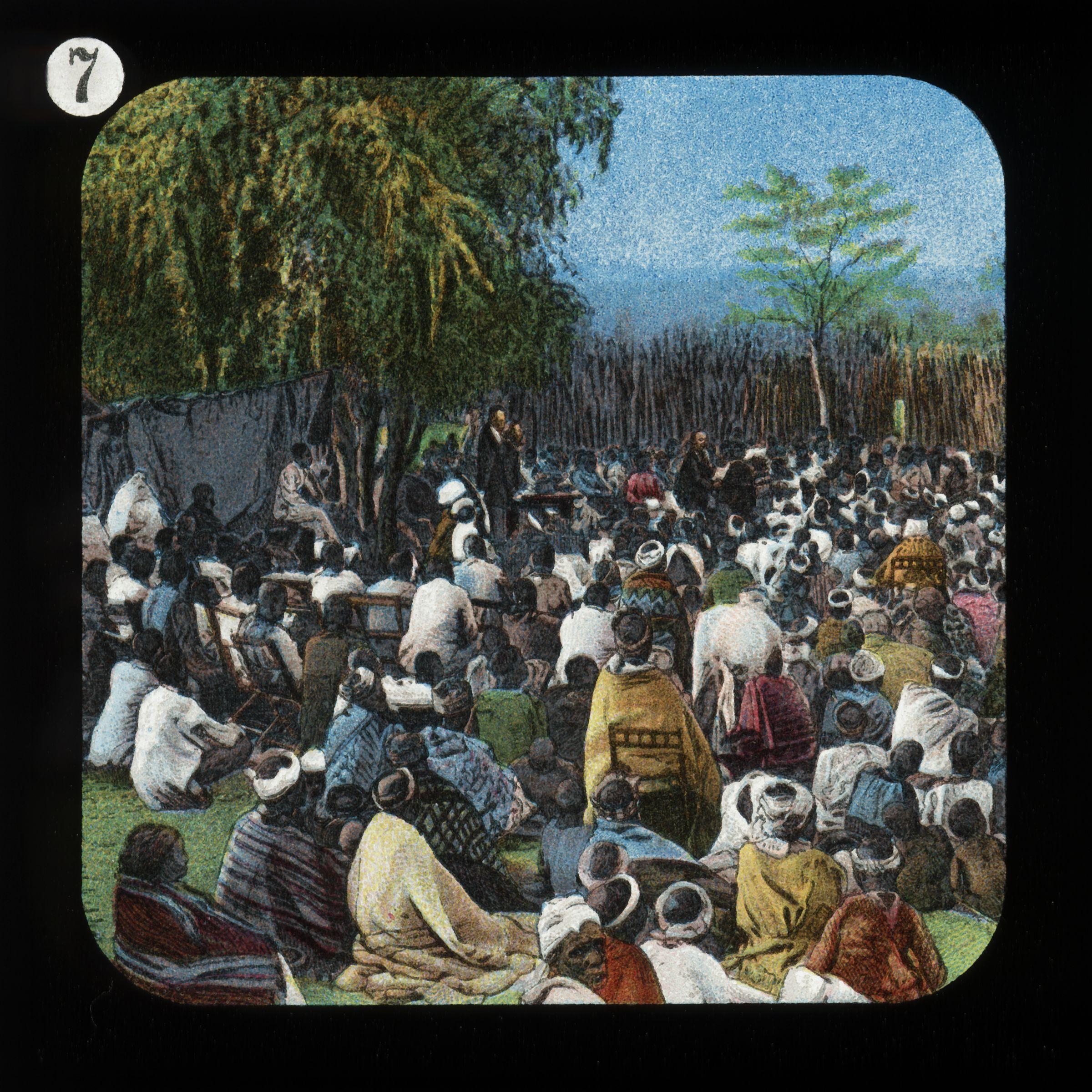
Around 1900, the London Missionary Society produced a series of glass magic lantern slides, including this one, depicting the missionary efforts of David Livingstone.

The London Missionary Society (LMS) was an interdenominational evangelical missionary society formed in England in 1795 at the instigation of Welsh Congregationalist minister Edward Williams. It was largely Reformed in outlook, with Congregational missions in Oceania, Africa, and the Americas, although there were also Presbyterians (notable for their work in China), Methodists, Baptists, and various other Protestants involved. The Society sent missionaries all over the world, notably to India, China, Australia, Madagascar and Africa. Famous LMS missionaries included:

- Robert Morrison (1782–1834) who went to China in 1807;
- John Smith (1790–1824) was a LMS missionary whose experiences in the West Indies, beginning in 1817, attracted the attention of the anti-slavery campaigner William Wilberforce. As a result of his actions in the Demerara rebellion of 1823, trial by court martial and subsequent death in 1824, whilst under imprisonment, Smith became known as the "Demerara Martyr";
- John Williams served in the Pacific Ocean from 1821 until he was killed on the island of Erromango in the New Hebrides in 1839;
- David Livingstone (1813–1873), the medical missionary and explorer, served with the LMS from 1841 until 1857 in Southern Africa; and
- Eric Liddell, (1902–1945) 1924 Olympic gold medalist in the 400 metres race, served as an LMS missionary to China.

The London Missionary Society now forms part of the Council for World Mission.

== Origins ==
In 1793, Edward Williams, then minister at Carr's Lane, Birmingham, wrote a letter to the churches of the Midlands, expressing the need for interdenominational world evangelization and foreign missions. It was effective and Williams began to play an active part in the plans for a missionary society. He left Birmingham in 1795, becoming pastor at Masbrough, Rotherham, and tutor of the newly formed Masbrough academy. Also in 1793, the Anglican cleric John Eyre of Hackney founded the Evangelical Magazine. He had the support of the presbyterian John Love, and congregationalists Edward Parsons and John Townshend (1757–1826).

Proposals for the Missionary Society began in 1794 after a Baptist minister, John Ryland, received word from William Carey, the pioneer British Baptist missionary who had recently moved to Calcutta, about the need to spread Christianity. Carey suggested that Ryland join forces with others along the non-denominational lines of the Society for Effecting the Abolition of the Slave Trade, to design a society that could prevail against the difficulties that evangelicals often faced when spreading the Word. This aimed to overcome the difficulties that establishment of overseas missions had faced. It had frequently proved hard to raise the finance because evangelicals belonged to many denominations and churches; all too often their missions would only reach a small group of people and be hard to sustain. Edward Williams continued his involvement and, in July 1796, gave the charge to the first missionaries sent out by the Society.

The Society aimed to create a forum where evangelicals could work together, give overseas missions financial support and co-ordination. It also advocated against opponents who wanted unrestricted commercial and military relations with native peoples throughout the world.

After Ryland showed Carey's letter to Henry Overton Wills, an anti-slavery campaigner in Bristol, he quickly gained support. Scottish ministers in the London area, David Bogue and James Steven, as well as other evangelicals such as John Hey, joined forces to organize a new society. Bogue wrote an influential appeal in the Evangelical Magazine for September 1794:

Ye were once Pagans, living in cruel and abominable idolatry. The servants of Jesus came from other lands, and preached His Gospel among you. Hence your knowledge of salvation. And ought ye not, as an equitable compensation for their kindness, to send messengers to the nations which are in like condition with yourselves of old, to entreat them that they turn from their dumb idol to the living God, and to wait for His Son from heaven? Verily their debtors ye are.

John Eyre responded by inviting a leading and influential evangelical, the Rev. Thomas Haweis, to write a response to Bogue's appeal. The Cornishman sided firmly with Bogue, and immediately identified two donors, one of £500, and one of £100. From this start, a campaign developed to raise money for the proposed society, and its first meeting was organised at Baker's Coffee House on Change Alley in the City of London. Eighteen supporters showed up and helped agree the aims of the proposed missionary society – to spread the knowledge of Christ among heathen and other unenlightened nations. By Christmas over thirty men were committed to forming the society.

In the following year, 1795, Spa Fields Chapel was approached for permission to preach a sermon to the various ministers and others by now keenly associated with the plan to send missionaries abroad. This was organised for Tuesday 22 September 1795, the host chapel insisting that no collection for the proposed society must be made during the founding event which would be more solemn, and formally mark the origin of the Missionary Society. Hundreds of evangelicals attended, and the newly launched society quickly began receiving letters of financial support, and interest from prospective missionaries.

== Early days ==
Joseph Hardcastle of Hatcham House, Deptford became the first Treasurer, and the Rev. John Eyre of Hackney (editor of the Evangelical Magazine ) became the first Secretary to the Missionary Society—the latter appointment providing it with an effective 'newspaper' to promote its cause. The Missionary Society's board quickly began interviewing prospective candidates. In 1800, the Society placed missionaries with the Rev. David Bogue of Gosport for preparation for their ministries.

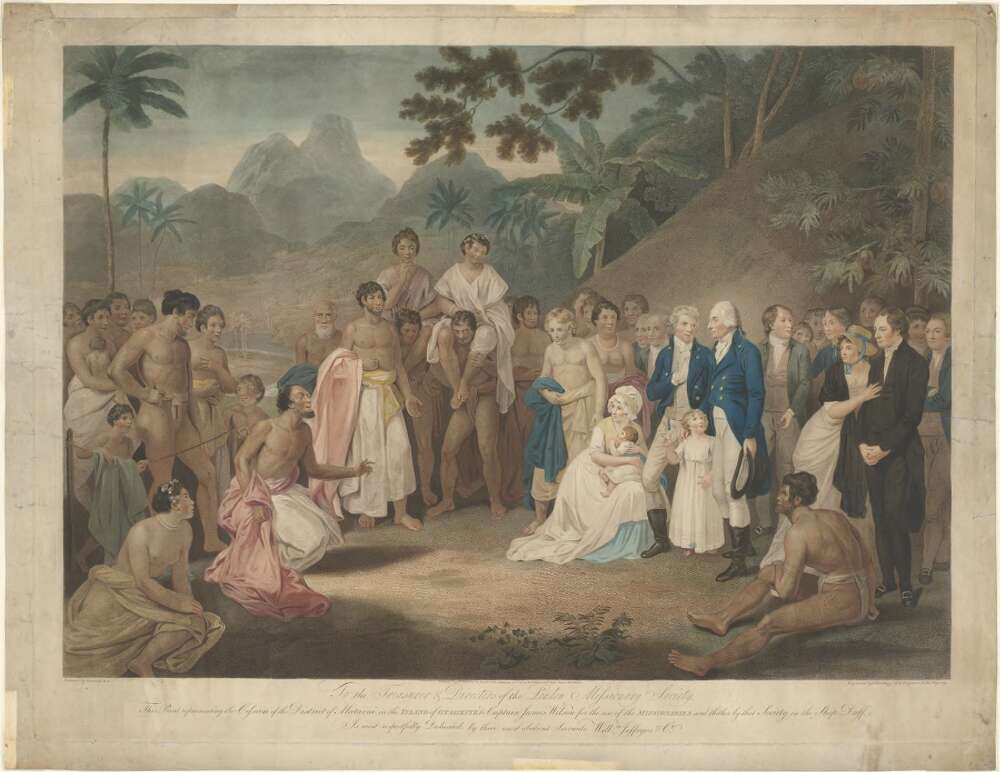
The cession of the district of Matavai in the island of Tahiti to Captain James Wilson for the use of the missionaries.

Captain James Wilson offered to sail the missionaries to their destination unpaid. The Society was able to afford the small ship Duff, of 267 tons (bm). It could carry 18 crew members and 30 missionaries. Seven months after the crew left port from the Woolwich docks in late 1796, they arrived in Tahiti, where seventeen missionaries departed. The missionaries were then instructed to become friendly with the natives, build a mission house for sleeping and worship, and learn the native language. The missionaries faced unforeseen problems. The natives had firearms and were anxious to gain possessions from the crew. The Tahitians also had faced difficulties with diseases spread from the crews of ships that had previously docked there. The natives saw this as retribution from the gods, and they were very suspicious of the crew. Of the seventeen missionaries that arrived in Tahiti, eight soon left on the first British ship to arrive in Tahiti.

When Duff returned to Britain it was immediately sent back to Tahiti with thirty more missionaries. This journey was disastrous. A French privateer captured Duff, landed its prisoners in Montevideo, and sold her. The expense of the journey cost 'The Missionary Society' ten thousand pounds, which was initially devastating to the Society. Gradually it recovered, however, and in 1807, was able to establish a mission in Guangzhou (Canton), China under Robert Morrison.

Another missionary who served in China was John Kenneth Mackenzie. A native of Yarmouth in England, he served in Hankow and Tientsin.

Starting in 1815, they hired Abdullah bin Abdul Kadir as a translator, to work on many texts including the gospels.

After attending Homerton College, then in Hampstead, William Ellis was ordained in 1815. Soon atter his marriage to Mary Mercy Moor on 9 November 1815, they were posted to the South Sea Islands, returning in 1824. He later become Chief Foreign Secretary.

In September 1816, Robert Moffat (1795–1883) was commissioned in the Surrey Chapel, Southwark, on the same day as John Williams. Moffat served in South Africa until 1870. Mary Moffat joined him and they married in 1819. The LMS only employed male missionaries and it preferred them to be married. The Moffats were to have several children who also became and/or married missionaries.

In 1817, Edward Stallybrass was sent out to Russia to start a mission among the Buryat people of Siberia. The mission received the blessing of Alexander I of Russia, but was suppressed in 1840 under his successor Nicholas I. Alongside Stallybrass worked Cornelius Rahmn of Sweden, William Swan and Robert Yuille of Scotland.

== Later work ==
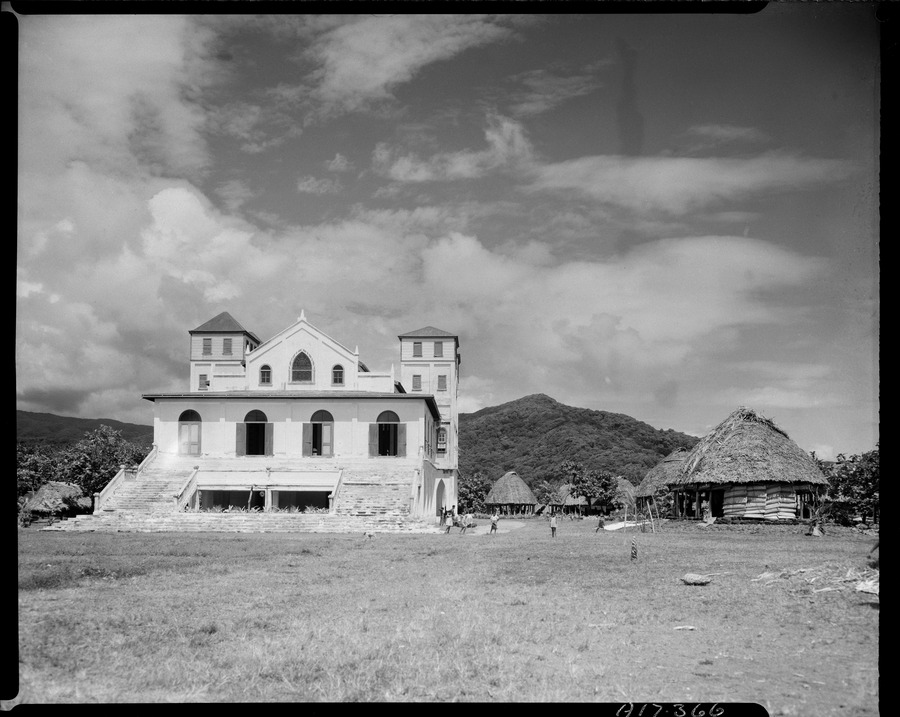
London Missionary Society, Samoa (1949)

In 1818, the Society was renamed The London Missionary Society.

In 1822, John Philip was appointed superintendent of the London Missionary Society stations in South Africa where he fought for the rights of the indigenous people.

1821 – John Williams is the first recorded reverend of the Cook Islands Christian Church (CICC) in Arutanga, Aitutaki, Cook Islands. It is here that the missionary work was first established. In later years John Williams visited Rarotonga, taking with him two Tahitians he picked up from Tahiti. One of the Tahitians, named Papehia, was used as intermediaries to convince local chiefs to join the new gospel.

1830 – John Williams sighted the coast of Savai'i in Samoa and landed on August 24, 1830 at Sapapali'i village in search of Malietoa Vai‘inupo, a paramount chief of Samoa. John Williams was greeted by his brother Taimalelagi. Upon meeting Malietoa at a large gathering in Sapapali'i, the LMS mission was accepted and grew rapidly throughout the Samoan Islands. The eastern end of the Samoan archipelago, was the kingdom of Manu'a. The paramount chief, Tui-Manu'a embraced Christianity and Manu'a also became a LMS island kingdom.

1832 – John Williams (Ioane Viliamu as he is known to Samoans) landed at Leone Bay in what was later to become American Samoa. (Tala faasolopito o le Ekalesia Samoa) He was informed that men of their village have accepted the 'lotu' brought by Ioane Viliamu in Savai'i; not knowing John Williams now stood before them. A monument stands before the large Siona Chapel – now CCCAS in Leone, American Samoa – in honor of John Williams.

In 1839, John Williams's missionary work whilst visiting the New Hebrides came to an abrupt end, when he was killed and eaten by cannibals on the island of Erromango whilst he was preaching to them. He was traveling at the time in the Missionary ship Camden commanded by Captain Robert Clark Morgan (1798–1864). A memorial stone was erected on the island of Rarotonga in 1839 and is still there today. His widow is buried with their son, Samuel Tamatoa Williams, at the old Cedar Circle in London's Abney Park Cemetery, the name of her husband and the record of his death described first on the stone. John Williams' remains were sought by a group from Samoa and his bones were brought back to Samoa, where throngs of the LMS mission attended a funeral service attended by Samoan royalty, high-ranking chiefs and the LMS missionaries. His remains were interred at the native LMS church in Apia. A monument stands in his memory across from the Congregational Christian Church of Apia chapel.

The Rev. Alexander MacDonald and his wife Selina (née Blomfield) arrived in Rarotonga in May 1836, then Samoa in April 1837 and settled at Safune on the central north coast of Savai'i island in Samoa in August 1837. He left the LMS in 1850 when he accepted a position with the Congregational church in Auckland, New Zealand.

1839–1879 – The Rev. George Pratt served as a missionary in Samoa for many years, at the station at Matautu on Savai'i island. Pratt was a linguist and authored the first grammar and dictionary on the Samoan language, first published in 1862 at the Samoa Mission Press.

In 1840, the medical missionary and explorer David Livingstone (1813–1873) departed for South Africa, arriving in 1841, and serving with the LMS until 1857. Moffat and Livingstone met circa 1841. In 1845, Livingstone married Robert and Mary Moffat's daughter Mary (1821–1862).

Around 1842, founded the London Missionary Society's School for the Sons and Orphans of Missionaries, now known as Eltham College. David Livingstone sent his son Robert to the school during the 1850s. Eric Liddell, Olympic athlete and Missionary, also attended the school.

1844 – London Missionary Society established Malua Theological College at the village of Malua on Upolu to educate local men to become village clergy for the rapidly growing mission with over 250 villages and 25,000 membership.

1844 – London Missionary Society sent Samoan missionaries to surrounding islands; Rotuma, Niue, Tokelau, Ellice Islands, Papua, Vanuatu. Over 300 served in Papua alone.

1865 - the Rev. Archibald Wright Murray evangelised among the inhabitants of the Ellice Islands, Samoa, Tonga, and New Guinea.

15 October 1870 - Rev. Samuel James Whitmee arrived at Arorae (Gilbert Islands, now Kiribati), and later that month he visited Tamana, Onoatoa and Beru. In August 1872, George Pratt of the LMS visited the Gilbert Islands.

1871 - London Missionary Society arrives in the Torres Strait Islands (now in Queensland, Australia). The event is commemorated to this day by the Torres Strait Islanders in the annual Coming of the Light Festival.

== Notable missionaries ==
- John Abbs (1810–1888) who went to India in 1837. he spent twenty-two years in Travancore, Southern India.
- James Legge (1815–1897), Sinologist;
- David Livingstone (1813–1873) who went to South Africa in 1840;
- Thomas Powell FLS (1817–1887) in the islands of Samoa from 1845;
- Griffith John (1831–1912) from 1855 in Hubei [Hupeh], Hunan, [Szechwan], China;
- John Mackenzie (1835–1899) who went to South Africa in 1858, argued for the rights of the Africans and against the racism of the Boers, and was instrumental in the creation of the Bechuanaland Protectorate (modern Botswana);
- William Deans Cowan (1844 -1924) who collected fauna and flora in Madagascar;
- Fred C. Roberts (1862–1894) went to Tientsin, China in 1887, taught at the first Western medical school in China and brought famine relief to rural villagers
- William Edward Goward (1899–1919) ran the London Missionary Society (LMS) Mission based at Rongorongo on Beru island
- George Herbert Eastman ran the London Missionary Society Mission in Rarotonga, Cook Islands, 1913–1918. Between 1918 and 1947, he ran the LMS Gilbert Islands [Kiribati] Mission, based at Rongorongo on Beru island
- Ernest Cromwell Peake (1874–1950) who brought 'western medicine' to Hengzhou (now Henyang), China;
- Ernest Black Struthers (1886–1977) who travelled to Hong Kong in 1913;
- Eric Liddell, 1924 Olympic gold medalist in the 400 metres race, served as an LMS missionary to China.
- Constance Fairhall (1906–1993), missionary nurse who ran leper and tuberculosis hospitals in Port Moresby for 37 years

== Merger ==
The London Missionary Society merged with the Commonwealth Missionary Society (formerly the Colonial Missionary Society) in 1966 to form the Congregational Council for World Mission (CCWM). At the formation of the United Reformed Church in 1972 it underwent another name change, becoming the Council for World Mission (Congregational and Reformed). The CWM (Congregational and Reformed) was again restructured in 1977 to create a more internationalist and global body, the Council for World Mission.

The records of the London Missionary Society are held at the library of the School of Oriental and African Studies in London.

== Publications ==
- Abel, Charles William (1902). Savage Life in New Guinea. The Papuan in Many Moods. London: London Missionary Society.
- Powell, Thomas (1887). "Description of the Samoan Islands". Journal of the Transactions of the Victoria Institute, or Philosophical Society of Great Britain. 20. London: Victoria Institute: 173–175 – via BHL.
- Pratt, George (1893). A Grammar and Dictionary of the Samoan Language, with English and Samoan Vocabulary (3rd ed.). London Missionary Society.
- Fairhall, Constance (1961). Some shape of beauty. London Missionary Society.
- Christhudhas, M. (2019). Christianity and Health & Educational Development in South Travancore: The Work of the London Missionary Society from 1890-1947. Christian World Imprints. ISBN 9789351483571.

== See also ==
- List of London Missionary Society missionaries in China
- Protestant missionary societies in China during the 19th Century
- School of Oriental and African Studies in London
- The Historical Background to Church Activities in Zambia
- List of ships named John Williams, seven LMS missionary ships
- SS Ellengowan, a missionary ship
- Missionary Day, French Polynesian holiday celebrating the arrival of the Duff in 1797

== Bibliography ==
- Ellis, William (1844), 'History of the London Missionary Society', London: John Snow Volume One
- Lovett, Richard (1899), 'History of the London Missionary Society 1795-1895', London: Henry Frowde Volume One, Volume Two
- Goodall, Norman (1954), 'History of the London Missionary Society 1895-1945', London: O.U.P.
- Hiney, Thomas (2000), 'On the Missionary Trail', New York: Atlantic Monthly Press
- Chamberlain, David (1924), 'Smith of Demerara', London: Simpkin, Marshall &co
- Northcott, Cecil (1945), 'Glorious Company; 150 Years Life and Work of the London Missionary Society 1795–1945', London:Livingstone Press
- The Evangelical Magazine and Missionary Chronicle
- Spa Fields Chapel Minutes, British History Online: Spa Fields Chapel Minutes: 1784-1811 | British History Online
