= Samuel Walker (1779–1851) =

English Ironmaster and MP

Samuel Walker (4 September 1779 – 30 January 1851) was an English ironmaster from Yorkshire.

He was the oldest son of Samuel Walker, an ironmaster in Masbrough.

He was MP for Aldeburgh from 1818 to 1820.

Parliament of the United Kingdom
Preceded by The Lord Dufferin and Claneboye; Andrew Strahan	Member of Parliament for Aldeburgh; 1818 – 1820; With: Joshua Walker	Succeeded by James Blair; Joshua Walker
