= Edward Williams (minister) =

Welsh Congregationalist/Nonconformist minister, theological writer, and tutor

Edward Williams (14 November 1750 – 9 March 1813) was a Welsh Congregationalist/Nonconformist minister, theological writer, and tutor.

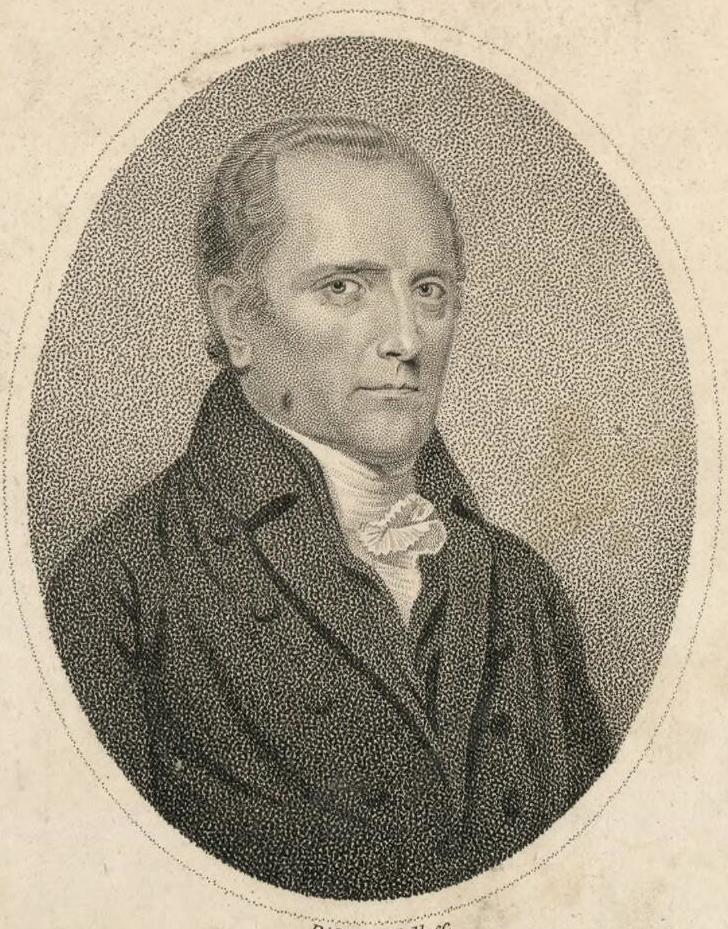
Portrait of Edward Williams

== Life ==
He was born at Glan Clwyd in Aberwheeler, near Denbigh, on 14 November 1750. His father, a farmer of good position, sent him to St. Asaph Grammar School, and he was intended for the Church of England. But while still young he came under the influence of the Methodists of the district; and, while studying with a curate at Derwen (David Ellis, who translated several books into Welsh), attended their meetings. He joined the Independent church at Denbigh, began to preach, and in 1771 entered the dissenting academy at Abergavenny.

His first pastoral charge was at Ross-on-Wye, where he was minister from 1775 to 1777, when he moved on to Oswestry.

Williams married Mary Llewellyin on 28 July 1777. In 1781, he was invited by Lady Glenorchy to train two students in her house at her expense. He began to do this. When Dr. Benjamin Davies left Abergavenny for Homerton College, it was suggested that Williams come to Abergavenny as his successor. Williams chose not to leave Oswestry, and so the academy was moved in May 1782 to Oswestry, and placed under Williams's care.

At the end of 1791, he gave up both church and academy, and, with the new year, commenced his ministry at Carr's Lane, Birmingham. In 1792 he was appointed first editor of the Evangelical Magazine and received the degree of D.D. from the University of Edinburgh.

As early as 1793, Williams wrote a letter to the Midlands churches expressing the need for world evangelization and foreign missions. It was an effective letter. Williams became involved in plans to form a missionary society. The society was formed in 1795 and subsequently took the name London Missionary Society. In July 1796, it was Edwards who preached the charge when the society sent out its first missionaries.

Williams left Birmingham in September 1795, becoming minister to the Masbrough Independent Chapel, Rotherham and also theological tutor at the nearby newly formed Rotherham Academy.

Williams' first wife had died on 22 July 1795, shortly before Williams left Birmingham. She left Williams with five children, four other children having died. He married Miss Yeomans of Worcester during 1796. They had one child, Edward Williams. Edward senior died at Rotherham on 9 March 1813, aged 62. His second wife survived until 1823.

Williams had helped found the London Missionary Society and also the West Riding Itinerant Society, as well as tutoring in several academies and being the first tutor at the Masbrough academy, spreading the light of the Gospel at home and abroad.

More than fifty years later, Dr F.J. Falding, a later principal at Rotherham, described him as a great theologian.

== Works ==
He was known as the advocate of a moderate form of Calvinism, expounded in his book on the ‘Equity of Divine Government’ (London, 1813). He was also the author of a discourse on the ‘Cross of Christ’ (Shrewsbury, 1792), an abridgment of John Owen's ‘Commentary on Hebrews,’ and a controversial work on baptism. His collected works were edited by Evan Davies in four volumes (London, 1862). He was an early Congregationalist pacifist.
