= Evangelical Magazine =

The Evangelical Magazine was a monthly magazine published in London from 1793 to 1904, and aimed at Calvinist Christians. It was supported by evangelical members of the Church of England, and by nonconformists with similar beliefs. Its editorial line included a strong interest in missionary work.

== Launch ==
John Eyre, an Anglican, played a significant role in founding the Evangelical Magazine, and as its editor, to 1802. Robert Culbertson was involved in the early times, and was an editor. William Kingsbury contributed from the start. John Townsend was a supporter; Edward Williams was another founder and editor.

In 1802 the Christian Observer began publication. It catered for evangelical Anglicans, and from this point the Evangelical Magazine came into the hands of Congregationalists.

== Editorial succession ==
- 1803–1826 George Burder
- c.1827–1857 John Morison
- 1877–1882 Henry Robert Reynolds

The successor from 1905 was the Evangelical British Missionary.

== Portrait artists ==
- William Thomas Fry, engraver
- Henry Room, painter
