= Sheffield Political Union =

The Sheffield Political Union (SPU) was an organisation established to campaign for Parliamentary Reform in Sheffield, England. It attracted 12,000 members in 1832.

The SPU was founded by "Eleven Poor Men of Hallamshire" as celebrated in a hymn of this name by Ebenezer Elliott.

In May 1833 the SPU originally proposed submitting a "humble prayer" to King William IV to dismiss his ministers and call a new election. However, when the wording was made somewhat stronger by turning this into a demand, the committee including Elliott, resigned and the union was wound up.

== Notable people associated with the Sheffield Political Union ==
- Ebenezer Elliott, poet
- Isaac Ironside, chartist
