= Masbrough Independent Chapel =

Former United Reform Church in Rotherham, England

Coordinates: 53.431°N 1.365°W

The Masbrough Independent Chapel (also known as Masbro Independent Chapel, Masbrough Chapel and Masbro Chapel) was an Independent or Congregationalist chapel in the Masbrough district of Rotherham, from the 18th century until the 1970s, at which point it became part of the United Reformed Church.

The chapel remained part of the United Reformed Church until its closure as a place of worship towards the end of the 20th century.

The chapel's congregation merged with the Greasbrough congregation of the United Reformed Church and then, in 2003, with the Greasbrough Methodist congregation to form a local ecumenical partnership using the name Greasbrough United Church.

The former chapel building was Listed as a building of special historical or architectural interest. After it was no longer used as a place of worship, it found a new use as a carpet warehouse.

The building suffered two serious fires in 2012, and it was demolished in December 2012.

The chapel was closely associated with the Walker family who were leading industrialists in Rotherham. The Walker Mausoleum stands in the chapel's burial ground and the Mausoleum is itself a Listed building.

The chapel was also closely associated with the Rotherham Independent Academy, a training school for ministers, founded in 1795. Later in the 19th century, the Academy moved from Masbrough to new premises built in "collegiate gothic" style on Moorgate Road, Rotherham.

The Moorgate Road premises are now occupied by the Thomas Rotherham College.

In 1795, Dr Edward Williams took the pastorate at the chapel and also became the first theological tutor at the then newly formed Rotherham Independent Academy which was built nearby. Joshua and Thomas Walker were generous benefactors to the Academy.

Williams had been one of those involved in the formation in 1794 of the missionary society that was later named London Missionary Society. Williams preached the charge to the first missionaries sent out by the society.

During the ministry of the Reverend Thomas Nicholson (served 1879–1900) the worshipping congregation grew from 225 to 530.

During the Depression of the 1920s and 30s, the congregation organized the construction of a bowling green on land near the chapel by un-employed men, for their recreational enjoyment, and classes in boot repair and other things were held to help them through the Depression.

During the 1950s, the chapel's minister Cyril Grant provided ministerial oversight for the formation and development of a new church at Herringthorpe, the church that is now the Herringthorpe United Reformed Church. This work first started in hired rooms at the Herringthorpe Junior School, later moving into its own purpose-built premises on Wickersley Road, adjacent to the Stag Inn.

== Early history ==
=== The Walker Family, Ironmasters ===
Three brothers Jonathan (1710–1778), Samuel (1715–1782) and Aaron (1718–1777) Walker came to the Masbrough area in 1746. Aaron was a farm worker who, together with a relative John Crawshaw, had begun experimenting with smelting and casting, in about 1741. Samuel was a schoolmaster at Grenoside and he also did some land-surveying and made sun-dials before going into business with his brothers. The brothers built casting houses, furnaces and a smithy in the Masbrough area. A water-powered forge was built in 1754 and in 1758 a blast furnace and a rolling mill. In just a few decades, they built the business into one of biggest iron and steel concerns in the country, and became the leading Ironmasters in the North. Cannon in the ships of the English fleet at the Battle of Trafalgar (1805) had been made in the Walker family's factories.

These brothers (Jonathan, Samuel and Aaron) were the sons (by his second wife, Anne Hargreave) of Joseph Walker (1673–1729), a nailmaker of Grenoside.

Samuel and Aaron were early converts to the 18th century religious revival or awakening in which George Whitfield, John Wesley, Charles Wesley, the Countess of Huntingdon and others were leading figures. In the mid-1700s, a doctrinal difference among the adherents of the movement led to two distinct streams. The controversy began to develop after John Wesley had preached a sermon in Bristol (1739) titled "Free Grace", in which he espoused theological doctrines known as Arminian. Samuel and Aaron followed the Calvinism of Whitfield and Lady Huntingdon, rather than the Arminianism of the Wesley brothers.

=== John Thorp ===
John Thorp was one of a group of men drinking in a tavern when the group decided that as a wager each of them in turn would mockingly imitate the earnest evangelistic preaching style of the Awakening. John was last of the group to perform and he vowed to easily out-perform the others, and to win the wager. During his "preaching" John became earnest and dropped his buffoonery. He found himself speaking in sincerity words he had intended mockingly. The hearers fell silent as they became aware of the change that had come upon him. John's life was transformed and he dedicated himself to the ministry of the Gospel.

=== Gathering of the Masbrough congregation ===
The Masbrough congregation was gathered in or about 1760, with John Thorp as its first minister. In 1762/3, Samuel and Aaron built the first Meetinghouse. Thorp remained in post as minister for sixteen years, until his death in 1776.

== Change of name ==
The word "Independent" (a word that, in this context, signifies Congregational) was dropped from the chapel's name in the 1970s when the congregation acceded to the United Reformed Church. Thereafter, it was known simply as "Masbro Chapel", or (more formally) as "Masbro Chapel (United Reformed)".

== Brief description ==
This description is based on text from the English Heritage "List entry description".

Situate at the corner of College Road (south side) and Chapel Walk (south side), to the west of Centenary Way. National Grid Reference: SK 42236 92934.

First Listed: 19 October 1951.

Established 1760. Dated '1777' on front window sill, although the building was extended forward 1829–30.

A red brick building in Flemish bond with ashlar sandstone quoins, Welsh slate roof, two storeys, three bays by five bays, and hipped roof. The loggia to the full width of the ground floor had ashlar pier to the left and five cast-iron columns on sandstone pedestals, the right column supporting the corner of the building.

The body of the chapel was galleried on four sides with an oblong well, the galleries being supported on cast-iron columns with decorative capitals. There were numerous wall monuments including a plaque to the Revd John Thorp (died 1776) and several to members of the Walker family, notably that to Jonathan Walker (died 1807) with statue depicting a man leaning on a truncated column with head in hand.

== Ministers (and their dates of service) ==
- John Thorp (1760–1776)
- Thomas Grove (1777–1793)
- Dr Edward Williams (1795–1813)
- Dr James Bennett (1813-c.1828)
- Clement Perrot (of Guernsey) (1829–1834)
- Dr William Hendry Stowell (born Isle of Man, 1800) (c.1834–1849)
- Alexander Raleigh (1850–1855)
- John Moon Charlton(1856–1857)
- Isaac Vaughan (1858–1865)
- William John Gates (1866–1878)
- Thomas Nicholson (1879–1900)
- Henry William Hill (assistant, 1885–1895)
- James Siddall Drummond (1902–1916)
- John Henry Cox (1918–1924)
- Norman Castles (1926–1935)
- William Silver (1937–1947)
- Ronald Joseph Goldman (co-pastor, 1949–1952)
- Cyril Handel Grant MBE (co-pastor 1949–1952; pastor 1952– c.1958) (lived 1919–2015) (founder, in 1963, of Bristol Samaritans)
- William Unsworth (c. 1960–1986)
- John Ashley Hardaker (1990 – ? )

== Books and journals ==
Chislett, Charles Masbro Independent Chapel Bicentenary 1760–1960 Published 1960.
