= London Democratic Association =

English Chartist political group

- Abbreviation: LDA
- Leader: George Julian Harney
- Founded: April 1838
- Preceded by: East London Democratic Association
- Headquarters: London
- Membership: 3,000
- Ideology: Chartism
- Political position: Left-wing

The East London Democratic Association (ELDA) was founded in January 1837 by George Julian Harney in opposition to the LWMA, later supported by James Bronterre O'Brien and Feargus O'Connor. In April 1838 ELDA was reconstituted as the London Democratic Association (LDA) with an eight-point resolution covering the Charter and more. Closely allied with the northern Chartists, by the end of 1838, the LDA had branches meeting in public houses within the City, Tower Hamlets and Southwark in addition to the regular meeting held at the Trades Hall, Bethnal Green.

During its active period, the LDA attracted the largest membership of any early metropolitan Chartist organisation (a little over 3,000 members). Prominent members of the LDA included Harney, Charles Neesom and William Cardo.
