= Hollow Meadows =

Hamlet in South Yorkshire, England

Coordinates: 53.385°N 1.64°W

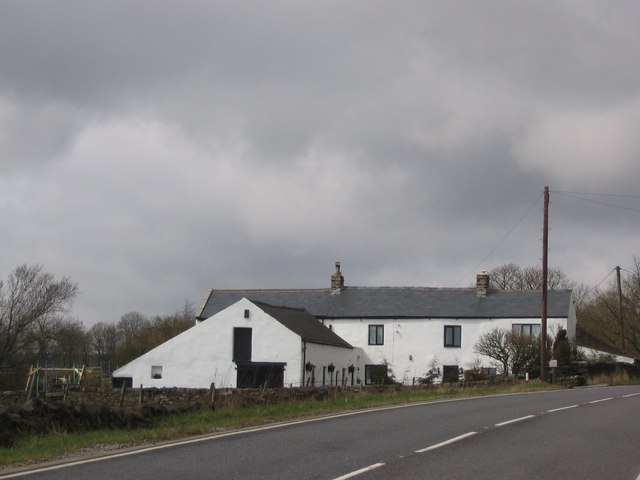
- Fold Farm, in Hollow Meadows

- Location within South Yorkshire
- Civil parish: Bradfield
- Metropolitan borough: Sheffield
- Metropolitan county: South Yorkshire
- Region: Yorkshire and the Humber
- Country: England
- Sovereign state: United Kingdom
- Post town: SHEFFIELD
- Postcode district: S6
- Dialling code: 0114
- Police: South Yorkshire
- Fire: South Yorkshire
- Ambulance: Yorkshire
- UK Parliament: Sheffield Hallam

Hollow Meadows is a hamlet in the civil parish of Bradfield, in the Sheffield district, in South Yorkshire, England, west of Sheffield. It lies along the A57 road, between Moscar and the Rivelin Valley.

== History ==
The area formed part of the chase of Rivelin until the late 16th-century, and was used for occasional deer hunting by the Duke of Norfolk. It became known as "Auley Meadows", named for the Hawley family, based in Fulwood, now a western suburb of Sheffield. By the time John Harrison surveyed the area, in 1637, it had been converted to pasture for grazing sheep, and totalled 429 acres.

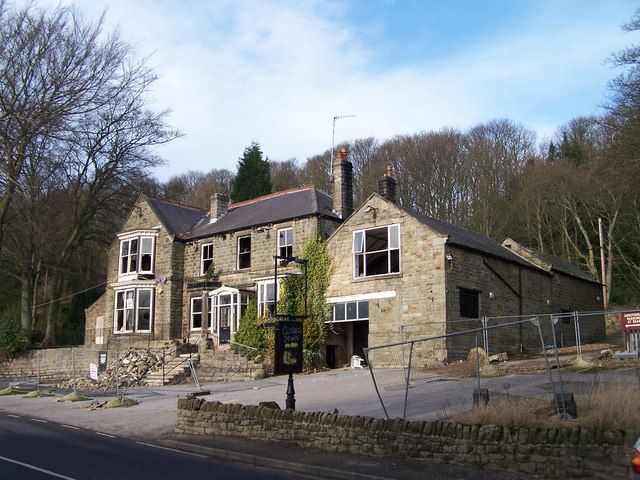
The "New" Norfolk Arms, shortly after closure

The Sheffield to Glossop turnpike road, now the Manchester Road, was constructed through Hollow Meadows and opened in 1821. The Surrey Arms pub was constructed alongside the road and had opened by 1822 to serve travellers. This was later renamed the "Norfolk Arms", and around 1896 reopened as the "New Norfolk Arms", on a site at the bottom of Onksley Lane, and became a bus terminus, but it closed in the mid-2000s.

In 1831, Isaac Bright, a prominent Jewish jeweller based in Sheffield, acquired a plot at Rod Moor, and began to construct mausoleums for his family. Ultimately, five stood at the site, four of which were in the shape of beehives. The site was badly vandalised in the 1980s, and then rendered inaccessible to visitors. The landowner demolished the buildings, illegally, before 2012.

Starting in 1844, the Duke of Norfolk let plots of his land in what was now known as "Hollow Meadows". Long leases and small rents attracted people to build houses and crofts. Sheffield Town Council decided to build its second workhouse on 48 acres of meadows in Hollow Meadows, on the initiative of Isaac Ironside; he hoped to provide a healthier alternative to existing workhouse conditions, and to show that a workhouse could be profitable. Other councillors noted the advantage of removing able-bodied men from the reach of potential political agitation. Paupers were initially put to work clearing the land and constructing the building, which included a dining room and dormitories. An average of 45 able-bodied men were based at the site, which was nicknamed "New England". Despite a high initial outlay, the farm started to turn a profit, but the management of the scheme was criticised as overly lax. From 1854, paupers were not permitted to engage in farming, only in clearing land and, once cleared, the land was let. Ironside withdrew from involvement, and the project gradually ran down. In 1879, it was converted into an industrial school for persistent truants, then became Hollow Meadows Hospital, and was later converted to housing.
