= George Calvert Holland =

English physician, phrenologist, mesmerist and homeopath

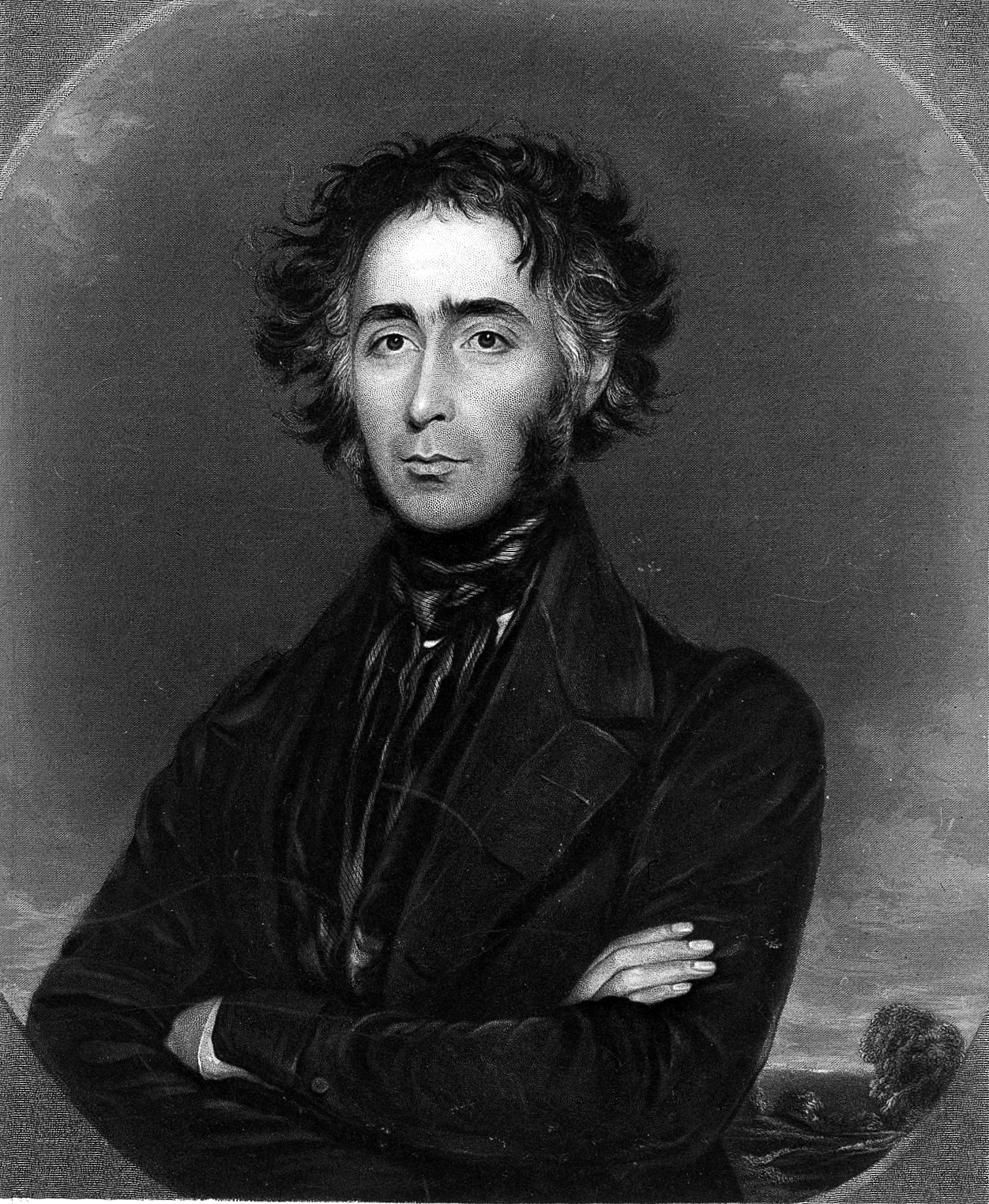
- Portrait of Holland by J. Brown
- Born: 28 February 1801; Pitsmoor, Sheffield
- Died: 7 March 1865 (aged 64); Sheffield
- Education: University of Edinburgh
- Occupations: Physician, phrenologist, mesmerist, homeopath, author, and politician

George Calvert Holland (28 February 1801 – 7 March 1865) was an English physician, phrenologist, mesmerist and homeopath. In later life he was active in politics and the railway boom.

== Life ==
Holland was born 28 February 1801 at Pitsmoor, Sheffield; his artisan father apprenticed him to a trade. When about 16 years old he took up writing verses, studied poetry, and learned Latin, French, and Italian. On the completion of his apprenticeship his friends, under the advice of Nathaniel Philipps of the Upper Chapel, Sheffield, placed him with a Unitarian minister with a view to his joining the Unitarian ministry.

After a year Holland went to the University of Edinburgh as a medical student, where he graduated M.D. in 1827, and, joining the Hunterian and Royal Physical Societies, became president of both. He spent a year in Paris, taking the degree of bachelor of letters, and after another year in Edinburgh began practice in Manchester. His advocacy of the phrenological theories of Franz Joseph Gall and Johann Spurzheim involved him in a sharp debate with medical colleagues there, and he moved to Sheffield.

In Sheffield Holland was prominent in the Literary and Philosophical Society, Mechanics' Library, and Mechanics' Institution, and campaigned for the return of Liberal members during the first and second elections for Sheffield under the Reform Act 1832. He was appointed one of the honorary physicians to the Sheffield General Infirmary. Holland was an enthusiastic student of the new science of mesmerism.

In the struggle for the repeal of the Corn Laws, Holland became a protectionist, which was detrimental to his professional earnings. Concentrating on other interests, he became provisional director of some of the railway projects at the time of the railway mania, and was also a director of the Leeds and West Riding Bank and of the Sheffield and Retford Bank. Financial collapse overtook the banks, and involved him in ruin. After an unsuccessful attempt to establish himself in London, he returned again to Sheffield in 1851, and began practice as a homœopath. He was elected a member of the town council, but lost his seat in 1858, owing to his advocacy of a Local Improvement Act.

In 1862 Holland he was made an alderman of the borough of Sheffield, and held the position until his death at Sheffield on 7 March 1865.

== Works ==
Holland's works An Experimental Enquiry into the Laws of Animal Life, Edinburgh, 1829, and The Physiology of the Fœtus, Liver, and Spleen, 1831, added to his professional reputation. In retirement in Worksop he wrote Philosophy of Animated Nature, 1848. Other works were:

- Essay on Education, 1828.
- Inquiry into the Principles and Practice of Medicine, 2 vols. 1833 and 1835.
- Corn Law Repealing Fallacies, 1840.
- Millocrat, 1841.
- An Inquiry Into the Moral, Social, and Intellectual Condition of the Industrious Classes of Sheffield, Part I: The Abuses and Evils of Charity, especially of Medical Charitable Institutions, 1839.
- The Vital Statistics of Sheffield, 1843.
- The Philosophy of the Moving Powers of the Blood.
- Diseases of the Lungs from Mechanical Causes, 1844.
- The Nature and Cure of Consumption, Indigestion, Scrofula, and Nervous Affections, 1850.
- Practical Suggestions for the Prevention of Consumption, 1850.
- Practical Views on Nervous Diseases, 1850.
- The Constitution of the Animal Creation as expressed in Structural Appendages, 1857.
- The Domestic Practice of Homœopathy, London, 1859.

He also edited a new edition of the poetical works of Richard Furness of Dore, with a sketch of his life, 1858.

== Notes ==
Attribution

This article incorporates text from a publication now in the public domain: Lee, Sidney, ed. (1891). "Holland, George Calvert". Dictionary of National Biography. Vol. 27. London: Smith, Elder & Co.
