= First missionaries in Polynesia =

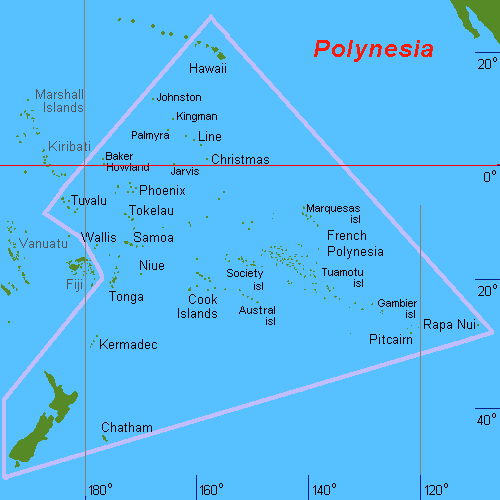
A map of Polynesia. Tahiti is the largest of the Society Islands.

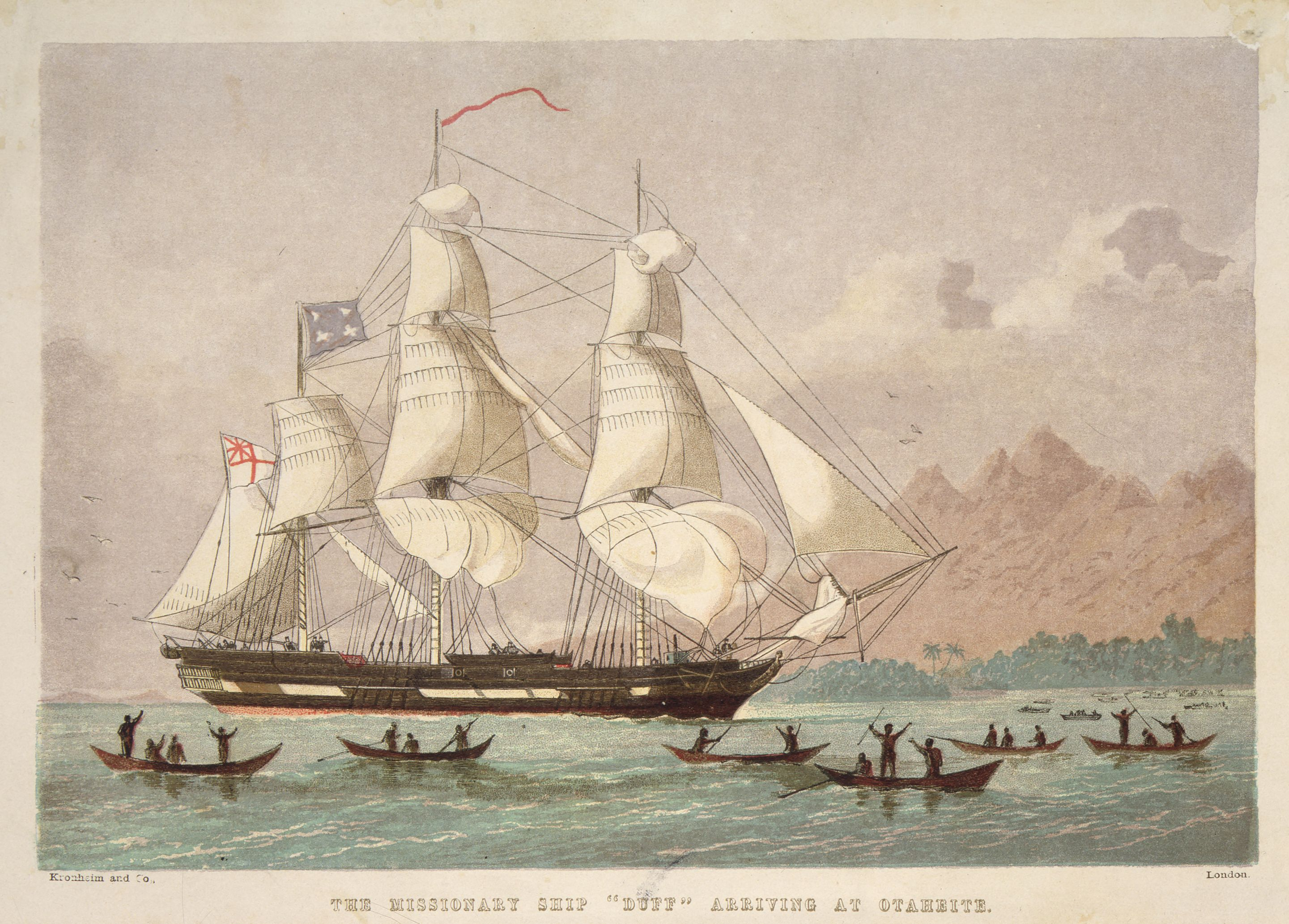
The Duff arrives in Tahiti.

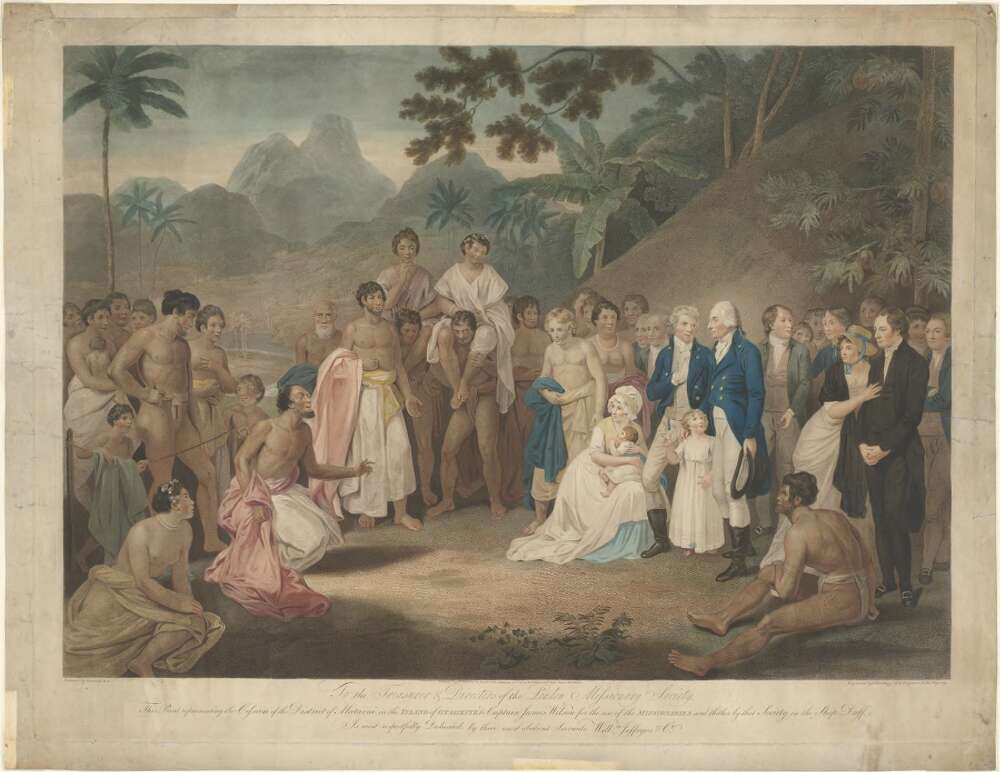
The missionaries and Tahitians.

The first missionaries in Polynesia arrived in the islands by sailing ship in 1797. Thirty male missionaries, five wives, and two children were in the group. They established missions in Tahiti, Tongatapu in the Tonga Islands, and in the Marquesas Islands. The Tonga and Marquesas missions were short-lived. Several of the missionaries lost heart, others "went native"; several returned to England, three were killed by the natives on Tongatapu in 1798 and the others fled the island. The Marquesas mission was abandoned in 1799. Most of the missionaries on Tahiti, fearing for their lives, left the island for Australia in 1798. The few remaining missionaries in Tahiti, beset by warring factions, abandoned the mission in 1809, but when the missionaries returned in 1811 they found an audience for their message and a "mass conversion" of Tahitians took place in 1815.

== The voyage and arrival ==
Polynesia was the first field of endeavour for the newly created London Missionary Society. On 10 August 1796, the first group of Protestant missionaries, 31 male missionaries, six wives, and three children departed near London, England aboard the Duff, a sailing ship captained by James Wilson. One child died and one married couple left the ship while still in British waters. Of the 30 remaining men, four were ordained ministers and the others were craftsmen and artisans who would support the ministers and also teach the Polynesians European technologies. John Jefferson, an ordained minister, was elected president of the missionary group. After several stops along the way, the Duff arrived at Matavai Bay on the island of Tahiti on 5 March 1797. Tahiti and the south Pacific Ocean islands had been known to Europeans for many years, but the Duff group were the first Protestant missionaries to the islands. A short lived Roman Catholic mission had been established on Tahiti in 1774.

The missionaries decided that 18 men, including the ordained ministers, and the women and children would remain in Tahiti. Ten men would go to Tonga and two would go to the Marquesas Islands. The Duff departed Tahiti 25 March and reached Tongatavu, the largest of the Tonga islands, on 10 April. The ten missionaries were left there and the Duff sailed to the Marquesas, arriving at Hiva Oa on 4 June. John Harris, one of the two missionaries to the Marquesas, found the people frightening, especially the women who undressed him to see if he were a normal man, decided not to remain, and returned to Tahiti with the Duff. The other missionary, William Pascoe Crook, remained almost two years in the Marquesas but would finally board a passing ship saying he feared for his life. Two missionaries, John A. Gillham, a surgeon, and Isaac Nobbs, a hatter, decided to abandon the mission and returned to England with the Duff which departed Polynesia on 7 September 1797 and reached England, after stopping in Macao, on 11 July 1798.

== Tahiti ==
Pomare II, the king of Tahiti, granted the missionaries the use of a large thatched-roof house built for Captain James Cook twenty years earlier and all moved into the building. The missionaries, the friendly greeting of the Tahitians notwithstanding, quickly became aware of the magnitude of their task. Jefferson said, "The more I see of the customs, temper, and conduct of this people, the more I am confirmed in an opinion...that our success will not be speedy." The Tahitians, they believed, were addicted to "the gratification of monstrous lust and the celebration of horrible and sanguinary religious rites." The missionaries worried about an attack on themselves and decided that they would defend themselves. Moreover, dissention quickly began. A few months after their arrival one of the ordained missionaries, Thomas Lewis, wanted to marry a native Tahitian woman. The group decided that was improper, but Lewis married her anyway and moved away from the other missionaries, although he continued to attend religious services.

Persuading the natives to adopt Christianity and European culture proved difficult. "They do not discover the smallest desire to know aught of the things of God; nor have they any curiosity...[The Tahitians] treat the arts and sciences and manners of Europeans with great indifference and contempt." Moreover, with war going on between different tribes, the missionaries feared for their lives. When the Nautilus, the first ship to call in Tahiti since the Duff, arrived at Tahiti a year after their arrival, eleven of the missionaries persuaded the captain to take them to Australia. The leaders of the defectors were apparently James Fleet Cover, one of the ordained ministers, and James Puckey, a carpenter. The Nautilus departed Tahiti 31 March 1798 for Port Jackson (now Sydney) Australia. Those remaining on Tahiti were ordained minister John Eyre (28 years old) and his wife Elizabeth (64 years old), and six additional men: Henry Bicknell, a carpenter; Benjamin Broomhall, a harness maker; John Harris, a cooper; John Jefferson, an ordained minister; the afore-mentioned Thomas Lewis (who had a Tahitian wife); and Henry Nott, a bricklayer. Lewis was murdered on 28 November 1799. On 5 January 1800, William Henry, one of the missionaries who had fled to Australia returned to Tahiti with his wife Sarah and his daughter. They were the only defectors who returned to Tahiti.

The missionaries suffered additional blows. A second group of 30 missionaries left England on the Duff in 1798 to reinforce the mission in the South Pacific, but the ship was captured by French privateers and the missionaries never made it to Tahiti. On Tahiti, on 6 June 1800, one of their diminished number, Benjamin Broomhall, announced his marriage to a local woman and declared that he no longer believed in the immortality of the soul.

Of the thirty original missionaries who arrived in Polynesia in 1797, only five remained as missionaries in the 19th century, along with two of the wives: ordained ministers John Eyre and John Jefferson and their wives, Henry Bicknell and William Henry, both carpenters, and Henry Nott, a bricklayer. All were resident in Tahiti or the nearby island of Moorea. The mission was reinforced in 1801 with six missionaries arriving from England, but political troubles caused the evacuation to Australia of all the missionaries in 1809. The mission was re-established in 1811 and finally gained some success on Tahiti and the neighbouring island of Moorea. A "mass conversion" of the Tahitians took place in 1815. The population of Tahiti by that time had been reduced to a remnant by diseases, introduced by the Europeans, and war. Nott and Henry were the most important missionaries in gaining a Christian foothold in Tahiti.

== Tonga ==
Ten missionaries were left on Tongatavu in the Tonga Islands on 10 April 1797. They were immediately embroiled in the internecine wars of the islands and in 1798 three of them were murdered: Daniel Bowell, a shopkeeper; Samuel Gaulton; and Samuel Harper, a cotton manufacturer. The remaining missionaries, except for George Veeson who "went native", fled the islands on 31 January 1799 by boarding a passing ship, the Betsy, en route to Australia. That ended the Tonga mission for several decades.

== Missionary Day ==
The day the missionaries arrived in Tahiti, 5 March 1797, is now a holiday called Missionary Day in French Polynesia.
