= Ogea =

Ogea may refer to:

- Ogea people: A Papuan people from Papua New Guinea
- Ogea language: The language spoken by the Ogea people
- Ogea Levu, a coral island near Fiji
- Ogea Driki, a coral island near Fiji
- Ogea monarch (Mayrornis versicolor), a species of bird endemic to those islands
