= John Jefferson (missionary) =

English missionary (1760–1807)

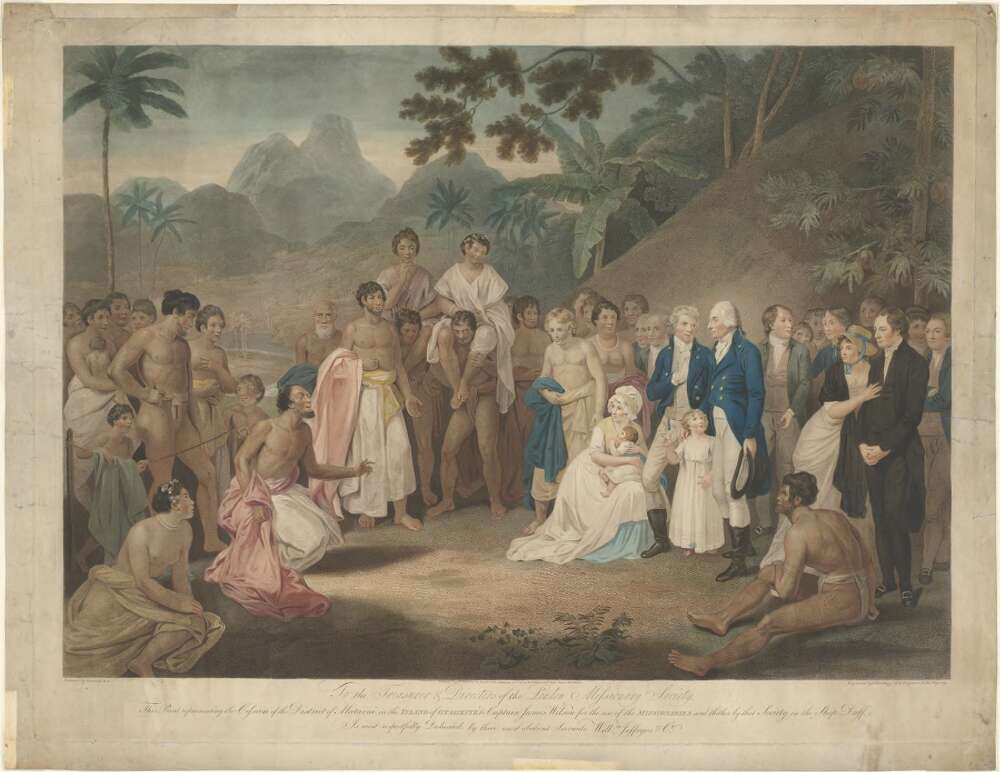
Arrival in Tahiti. Jefferson is the prominent figure to the right of the two men in blue coats.

John Jefferson (1760 – September 25, 1807) was an English missionary and a pioneering member of the London Missionary Society (LMS), who played a significant role in the early Protestant missionary efforts in Tahiti.

== Early life ==
Born in 1760, Jefferson was a devoted Christian from a young age and felt a strong calling to missionary work. He was ordained on August 9, 1796, at Haberdashers' Hall in London, just before embarking on a journey that would shape his legacy as a missionary in the South Seas. The next day, August 10, 1796, Jefferson and a group of fellow missionaries boarded the Duff at Woolwich Dock in London. The ship, commanded by Captain James Wilson, was bound for the South Pacific. The journey was long and arduous, with the missionaries sailing via Gibraltar and rounding Cape Horn, before finally arriving at Matavai Bay in Tahiti on March 5, 1797.

Upon their arrival in Tahiti, Captain James Wilson, John Jefferson, and a few other missionaries, accompanied by Haamanimani (Pomare II's paternal great-uncle) and Peter Hagerstein, a Swede, were received by the young King Pomare II, formerly known as Otu, and his wife, Tetua.

Eighteen missionaries disembarked, including those who were married, marking the beginning of the London Missionary Society's efforts in the region. Among them were Henry Nott, John Eyre (1768–1810), Henry Bicknell (1766-1820) who was a carpenter, and William Henry. William Pascoe Crook and John Harris were assigned to the island of Tahuata formerly called Santa Christina. John Harris, overcome with fear, retreated to the Duff before it had even weighed anchor.

As the leader of the missionary group, Jefferson played a crucial role in laying the foundations for the spread of Christianity in Tahiti and the surrounding islands. During his time in Tahiti, Jefferson worked tirelessly to promote Christianity among the islanders, despite the challenges that came with cultural and language barriers. His leadership and dedication earned him respect among his fellow missionaries, and he became known as one of the early figures in the establishment of Protestantism in the South Pacific.

== Missionary work amidst tribal warfare and ritual sacrifices ==
Jeffersons' writings, along with those of other missionaries, describe a turbulent era of tribal warfare, infanticide, human sacrifices, sexual libertinism as well as the devastating effects of alcohol on the local population.

== Jefferson’s death and legacy ==
Sadly, John Jefferson's life was cut short when he died on September 25, 1807, at Matavai, Tahiti. Despite his early death, his contributions to the London Missionary Society's mission in the South Seas remained influential, and his legacy continues to be remembered as part of the pioneering wave of Christian missionaries in the Pacific.

The arrival of the English missionaries is celebrated each year in French Polynesia. March 5th has been a public holiday since 1978.

The Bible translated into Tahitian by English missionaries still plays a central role in the Maohi culture.
