= John Jefferson =

John Jefferson may refer to:

- John Jefferson (missionary) (1760–1807), English missionary
- Joseph John Jefferson (1795–1882), English Congregationalist minister and Christian pacifist
- John Wayles Jefferson (1835–1892), American businessman and Union Army officer
- John Jefferson (American football) (born 1956), American football player

== See also ==
- Jon Jefferson (born 1955), American author and television documentary maker
