= Missionary Day =

French Polynesian official holiday

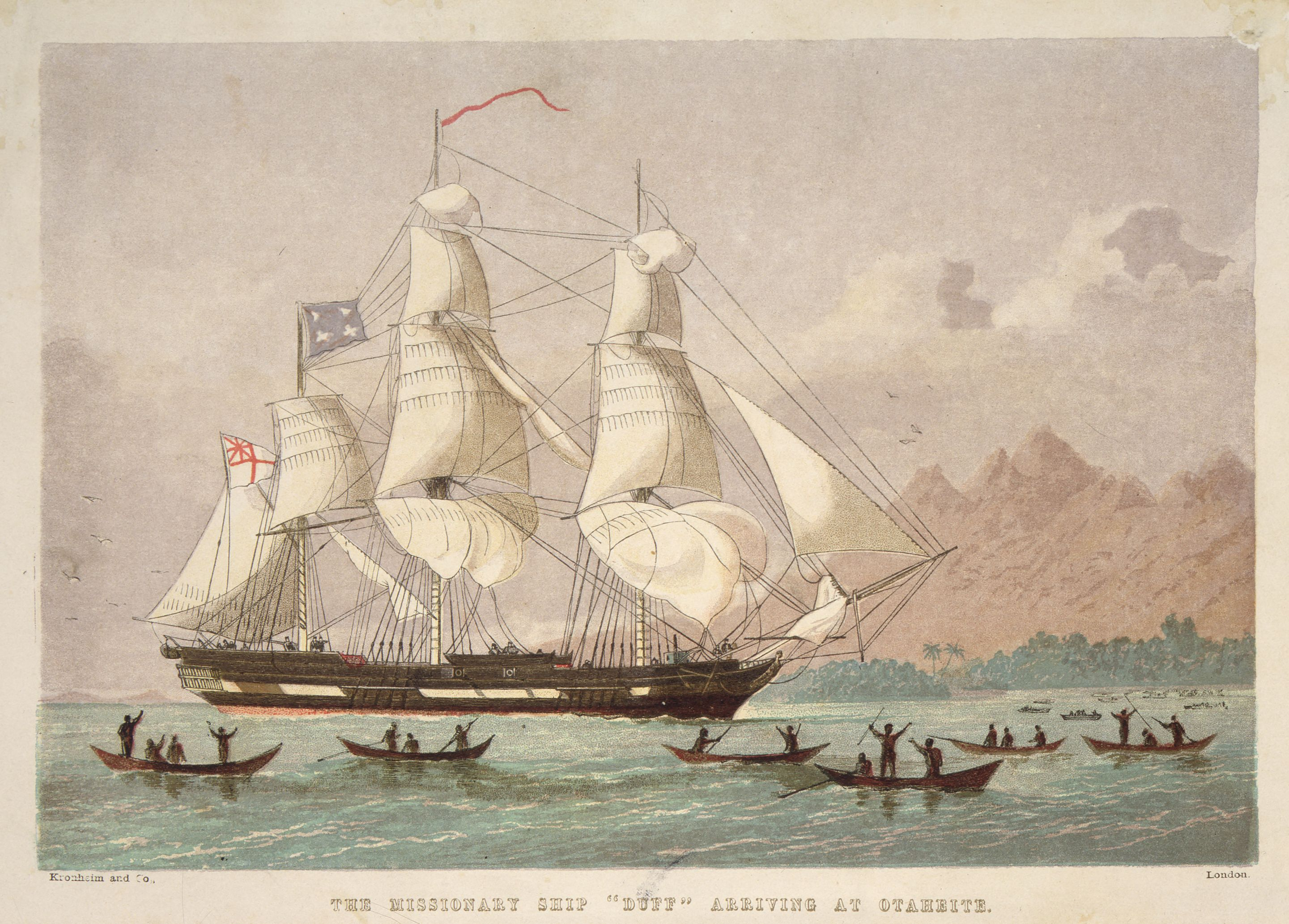
- The missionary ship Duff arriving in Tahiti, 1797
- Observed by: French Polynesia
- Significance: To mark the arrival of the London Missionary Society (LMS) missionaries in 1797
- Celebrations: Cultural shows, public concerts and other events of cultural significance
- Observances: Re-enactment of first landing
- Date: 5 March
- Next time: 5 March 2026
- Frequency: Annual

Missionary Day (French: Arrivée de l'Évangile) is an official holiday in French Polynesia, an overseas collectivity of France. It is celebrated annually on 5 March, to mark the arrival of the London Missionary Society (LMS) missionaries in 1797 when their ship Duff landed at Matavai Bay. It is a non-working holiday.

== History ==
On 5 March 1797, British Protestant missionaries from the London Missionary Society, led by John Jefferson, landed at Matavai Bay, in Mahina, Tahiti, on board Duff. Despite early setbacks in the mission, the LMS missionaries were able to convert the reigning king Pōmare II, who sought to use the new religion to consolidate his own power over the other chiefs of the island. The king was formally baptized on 16 May 1819, and the rest of the kingdom of Tahiti followed. Protestantism gained a strong following with the Tahitian people through the patronage of the Pōmare Dynasty and other chiefly families of the neighboring Society Islands. Even when Tahiti became a French protectorate in 1843 and was annexed in 1880, Protestantism remained the dominant religion among the natives.

The holiday was established on 1 February 1978.

== Celebrations ==
The parishes of the Maohi Protestant Church hold organized celebrations and worship services. The holiday is also marked by cultural shows, public concerts and other events of cultural significance. Traditionally, the arrival of the first missionaries in 1797 is re-enacted at the Willy Bambridge Stadium complex in Papeete, Tahiti, as well as on Afareaitu, Moorea.

The commune of Arue commemorates the festival by laying wreaths at the graves of the first Christian king Pōmare II and Henry Nott, a member of the first company of missionaries who translated the Bible into the Tahitian language.

== See also ==
- Internal Autonomy Day
