= Reao =

Atoll in French Polynesia

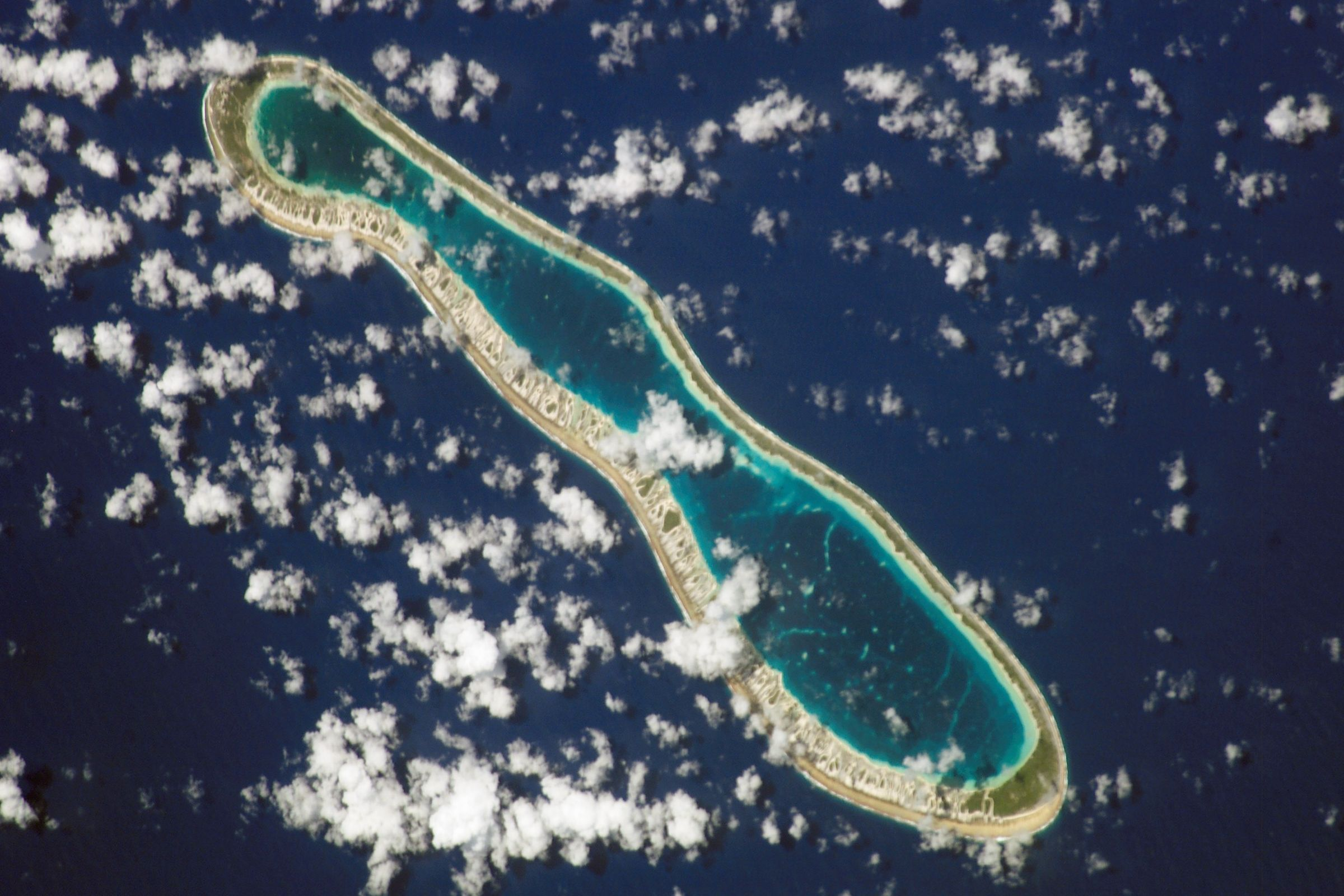
- NASA picture of Reao Atoll

- Location within French Polynesia

Geography
- Location: Pacific Ocean
- Coordinates: 18°28′11″S 136°26′33″W
- Archipelago: Tuamotus
- Area: 34 km^{2} (13 sq mi) (lagoon); 9 km^{2} (3 sq mi) (above water)
- Length: 24.5 km (15.22 mi)
- Width: 5 km (3.1 mi)

Administration
- France
- Overseas collectivity: French Polynesia
- Administrative subdivision: Tuamotus
- Commune: Reao

Demographics
- Population: 305 (2022)

Reao
- Commune
- Flag

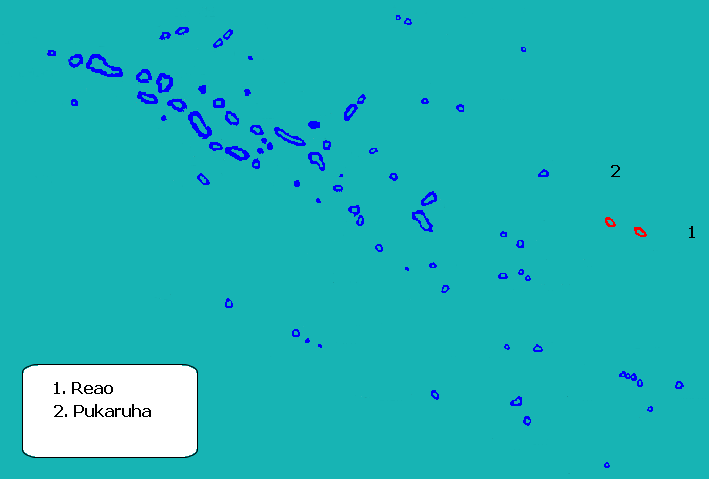
- Location of Reao
- Coordinates: 18°28′11″S 136°26′33″W
- Country: France
- Overseas collectivity: French Polynesia
- Subdivision: Îles Tuamotu-Gambier
- Area^{1}: 18 km^{2} (6.9 sq mi)
- Elevation: 0 m (0 ft)
- Population (2022): 513
  - Density: 28/km^{2} (74/sq mi)
- Time zone: UTC−10:00
- INSEE/Postal code: 98742 /
- ^{1} French Land Register data, which excludes lakes, ponds, glaciers > 1 km^{2} (0.386 sq mi or 247 acres) and river estuaries.

Reao or Natūpe is an atoll in the eastern expanses of the Tuamotu group in French Polynesia. The closest land is Pukarua Atoll, located 48 km to the WNW.

Reao is 24.5 km long and its maximum width is 5 km. The whole length of its north-eastern rim is occupied by a single long island. There is no navigable pass into the lagoon.

Reao Atoll's population is 305 inhabitants (2022).

== History ==
The first recorded European to sight Reao Atoll was French explorer Louis Isidore Duperrey in 1823. He named this atoll "Clermont Tonnerre".

Reao was visited by the United States Exploring Expedition led by Charles Wilkes on August 13, 1839. They became the first white men to set foot on the island, but were met by a hostile group of 17 natives. Surveying operations were only commenced after Wilkes had intimidated the opposing natives by firing light shot into their midst. Reao Airport was inaugurated in 1979.

== Flora and fauna ==
The lagoon of the atoll is particularly important in that it hosts large colonies of Porites mordax and Acropora formosa corals, as well as over 400 Tridacna maxima clams.

== Administration ==
The commune of Reao consists of Reao, as well as the atoll of Pukarua. Its total population is 513 (2022).
