= Clark Bentom =

English missionary and surgeon

- Born: c. 1774
- Died: c. 1820
- Occupations: Missionary, surgeon

Ecclesiastical career
- Religion: Presbyterian-style ministry

Clark Bentom (c. 1774 – c. 1820) was an English missionary and surgeon, who was a missionary in Canada at Quebec City, Quebec, from 1800 to 1805.

As a young man, Bentom was a footman to William Wilberforce. He was accepted into the London Missionary Society in 1798. In that year, he sailed for Tahiti with other missionaries on the Duff, but the ship was captured by French privateers. The crew and missionaries were released and arrived back in London in 1799.

Along with another missionary from that voyage, Bentom then sailed for Canada. He reached Quebec on 1 June 1800. In Canada, Bentom had a congregation and conducted a Presbyterian-style ministry with varied success. He also occasionally practised surgery. He was not accepted by the established clergy in the city and was eventually jailed for performing baptisms, marriages and burials without authorization for civil registers. His time in Quebec was notable in advancing the rights of non-Catholics and non-Anglicans to worship in freedom and be protected by law.

In 1805, he returned to England. He petitioned the House of Commons concerning the actions taken against him by the colonial authorities, but the outcome is not recorded. Nor did he receive support from the London Missionary Society.

Bentom left the society, and enlisted in the Royal Navy as a ship's surgeon.

He is thought to have died in Jamaica, circa 1820.

Correspondence and other documents by Bentom are held in the Council of World Missions Archive, at the library of SOAS University of London.

== See also ==
- List of Christian missionaries
- List of English people
- List of surgeons
- Religion in Canada
