= Ogea Driki =

Atoll in Lau Islands, Fiji

Coordinates: 19°12′S 178°25′W

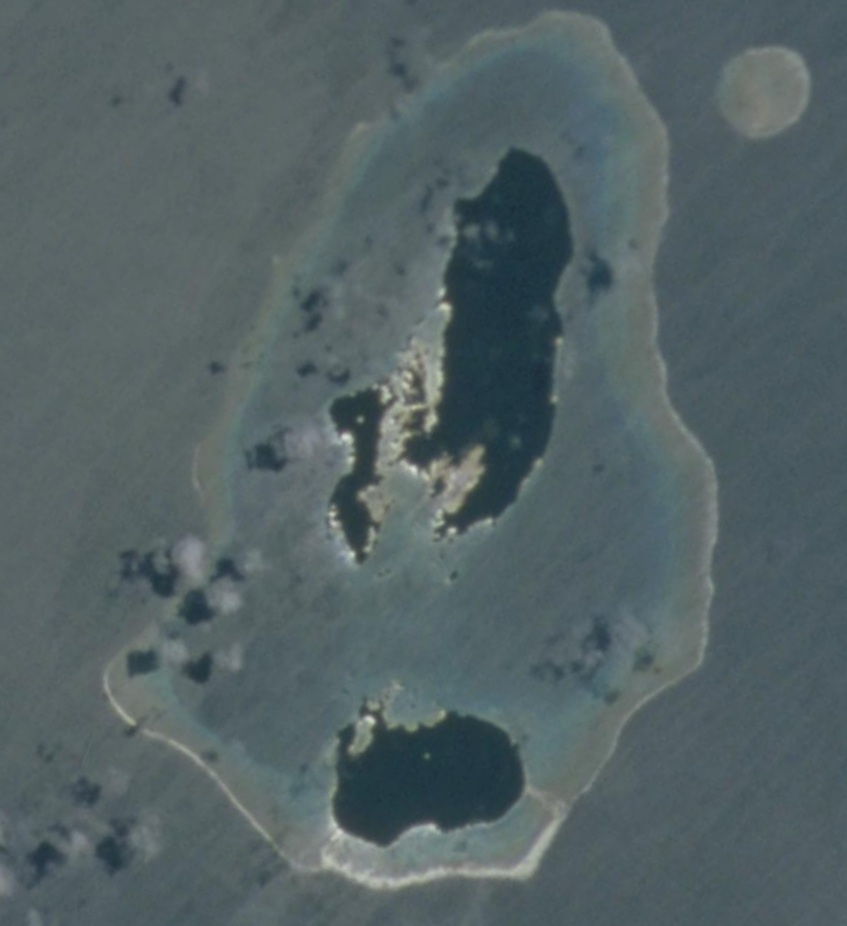
- NASA astronaut image of Ogea Driki (bottom) and Ogea Levu (top)

- Location within Fiji

Geography
- Location: South Pacific Ocean
- Archipelago: Southern Lau Islands
- Adjacent to: Koro Sea
- Area: 4 km^{2} (1.5 sq mi)

Administration
- Fiji
- Division: Eastern Division
- Province: Lau
- District: Vulaga

Demographics
- Population: 0

Ogea Driki (pronounced [oˈŋea ˈndriki]) is a coral atoll covering approximately 4 square kilometres (990 acres) in Fiji's Southern Lau Group. It is 2.7 kilometres (1.7 miles) south of Ogea Levu and 10 kilometres (6.2 miles) east of Fulaga.

A 1,830 hectares (4,500 acres) area covering both Ogea Driki and Ogea Levu is the Ogea Important Bird Area. The Important Bird Area covers the entire range of the near threatened Ogea monarch.

It is the farming and fishing ground for the Ogean villagers who own the island and subdivided into farming lots as well as beaches. It has no residential house but are always used by the Ogeans as a place to sleep overnight for fishing purposes or any other means. It has a rich bundled fish corals and reef.

== See also ==
- Desert island
- List of islands
