= Pukarua Airport =

Pukarua Airport Aérodrome de Pukarua
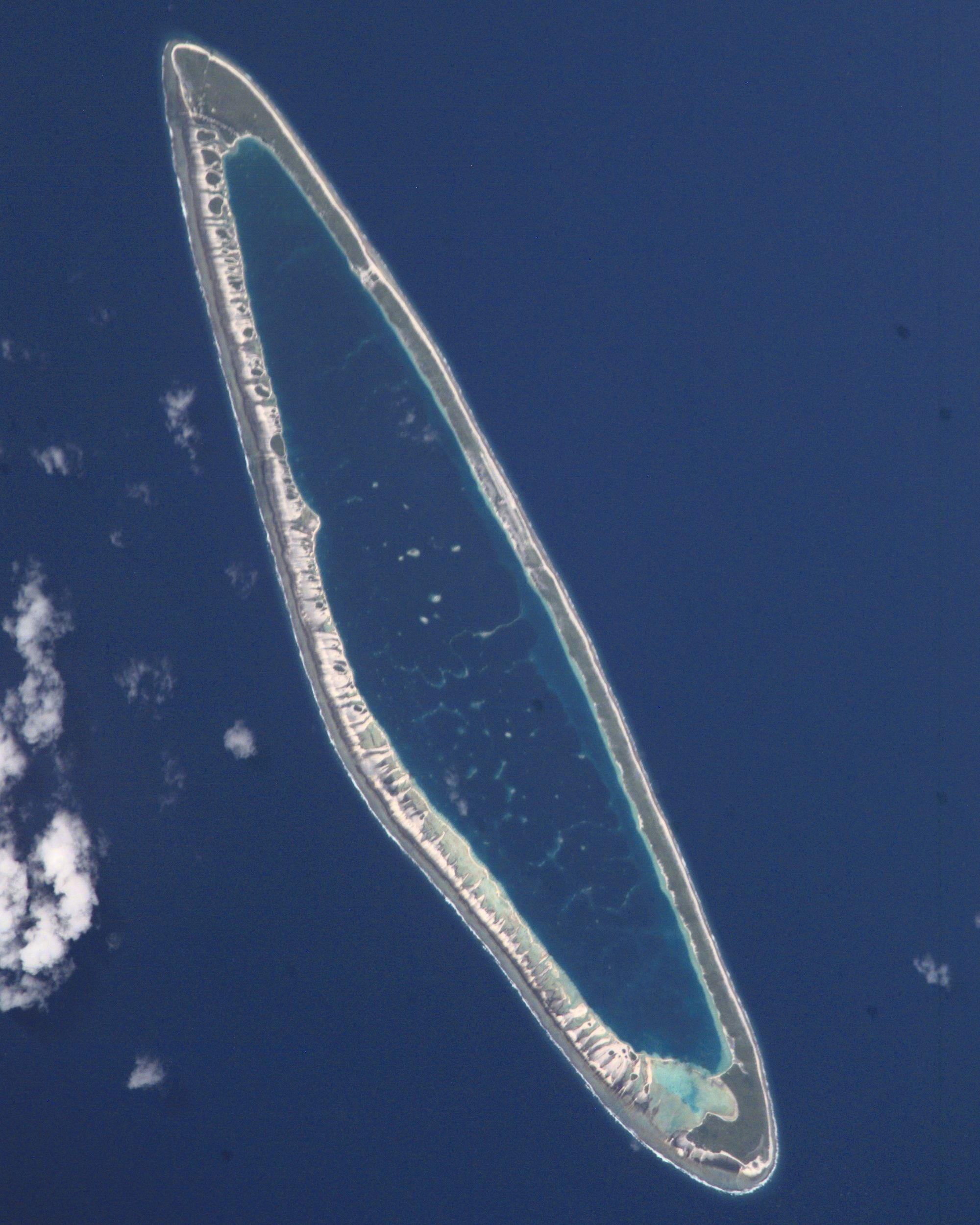
- NASA picture of Pukarua Atoll
- IATA: PUK; ICAO: NTGQ

Summary
- Airport type: Public
- Operator: DSEAC Polynésie Française
- Serves: Pukarua
- Location: Pukarua, Tuamotu, French Polynesia
- Elevation AMSL: 5 ft / 2 m
- Coordinates: 18°17′44″S 137°01′01″W

Map
- Location of the airport in French Polynesia

Runways
Direction	Length		Surface
Direction	m	ft	Surface
12/30	1,180	3,871	Paved
- Sources: DAFIF, French AIP.

Pukarua Airport (IATA: PUK, ICAO: NTGQ) is serving the village of Marautagaroa, located on the Pukarua atoll, in the Tuamotu group of atolls in French Polynesia, at 1,125 kilometres (699 mi) from Tahiti.

== Airlines and destinations ==
=== Passenger ===
No scheduled flights as of May 2019.

== See also ==
- List of airports in French Polynesia
