= Internal Autonomy Day =

Annual holiday in French Polynesia

Internal Autonomy Day (French: Fête de l’autonomie; Tahitian: Heiva o te) is an official holiday in French Polynesia, an overseas collectivity of France. It is celebrated annually on 29 June, to honor Tahitian and French Polynesian self-rule. The day also marked the annexation of the Kingdom of Tahiti and the turnover of native sovereignty by King Pōmare V to the Kingdom of France.

== Celebration ==
Pro-autonomy political parties celebrate the holiday on 29 June while Oscar Temaru, former President of French Polynesia who advocated independence from France, noted that the day should known as "Mourning Day" instead. The date French Polynesia achieved internal autonomy was on 6 September 1984 and Internal Autonomy Day was set up to celebrate it.

The holiday is mainly celebrated in the capital of Papeete, on the island of Tahiti. It is celebrate with parades, entertainment and concert on the waterfront of Papeete.

== Abolition and replacement ==
On 30 April 2024, a unanimous decision was made by the Council of Ministers in session with President Moetai Brotherson to abolish Internal Autonomy Day and replace it with Matari'i, a public holiday in native observance of the Pleiades on 20 November inspired by the success of similar Matariki celebrations in New Zealand, the act would be implemented officially on 2025. The decision was taken because it was believed that Internal Autonomy Day was specifically chosen to glorify French colonialism over the Kingdom of Tahiti. Despite the abolition, various employment sectors still elected to observe it.

== See also ==
- Missionary Day
