= Pukarua =

Atoll in French Polynesia

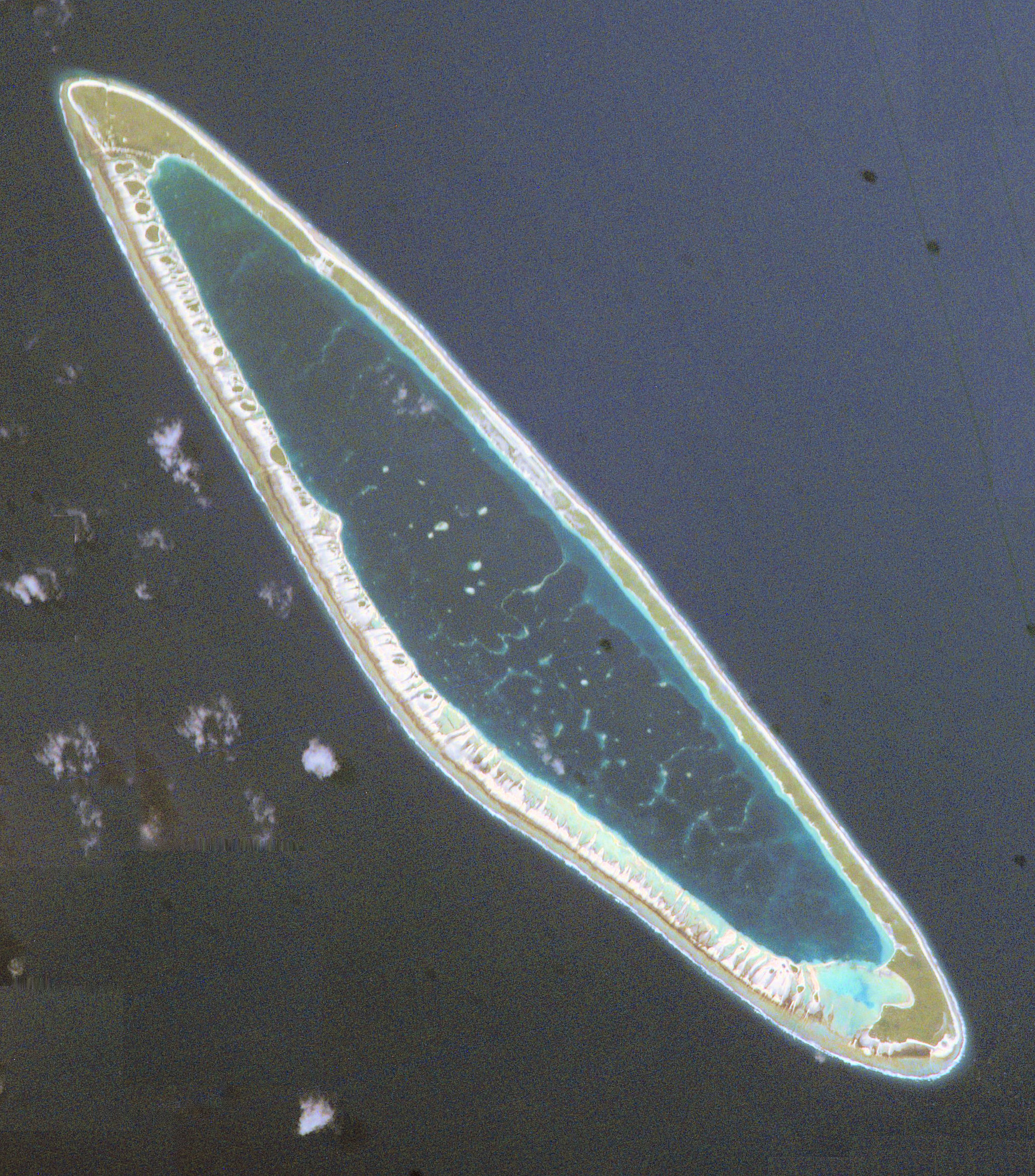
- NASA picture of Pukarua Atoll

- Location within French Polynesia

Geography
- Location: Pacific Ocean
- Coordinates: 18°19′S 137°01′W
- Archipelago: Tuamotus
- Area: 23 km^{2} (8.9 sq mi) (lagoon); 7 km^{2} (3 sq mi) (above water)
- Length: 17 km (10.6 mi)
- Width: 4.5 km (2.8 mi)

Administration
- France
- Overseas collectivity: French Polynesia
- Administrative subdivision: Tuamotus
- Commune: Reao
- Largest settlement: Marautagaroa

Demographics
- Population: 227 (2012)

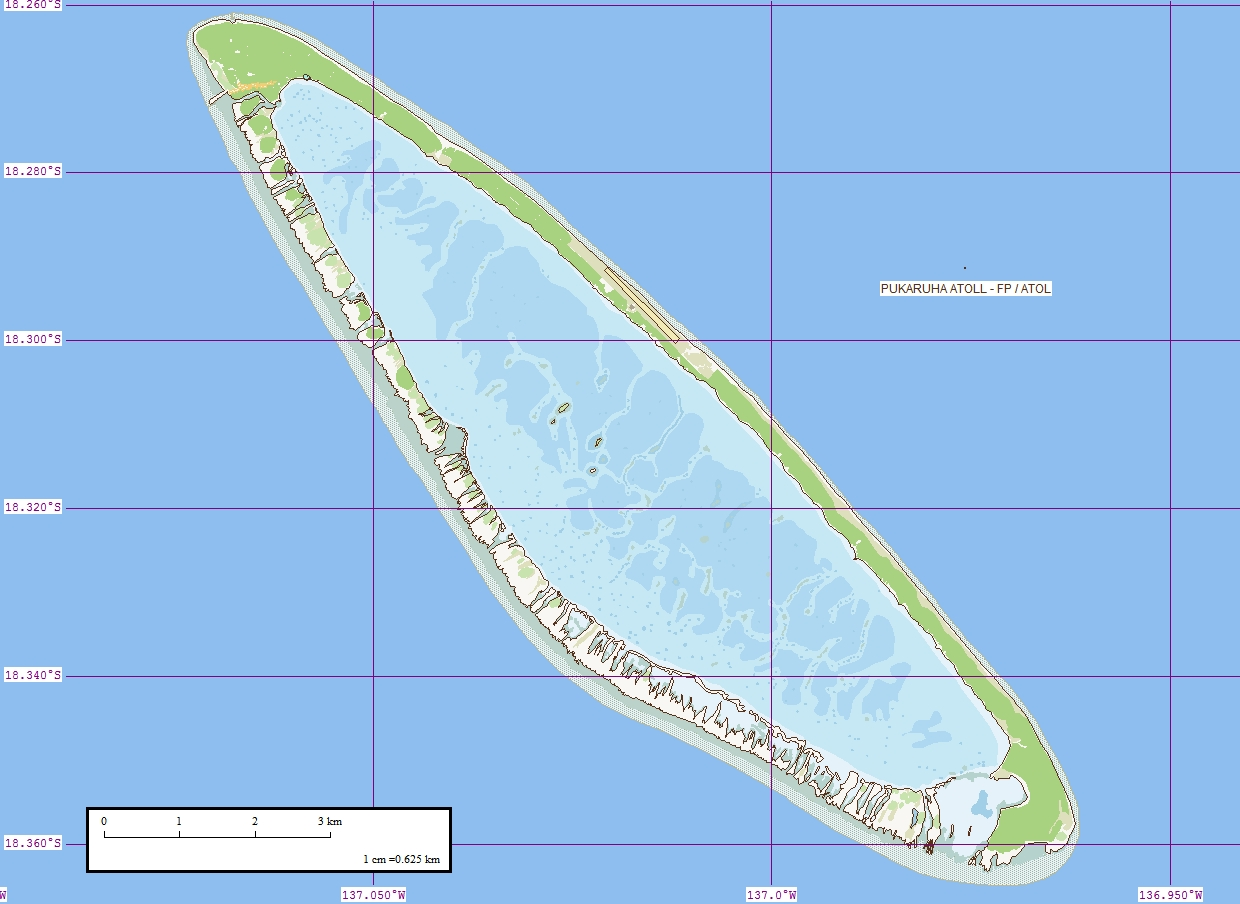
Map of Pukarua Atoll

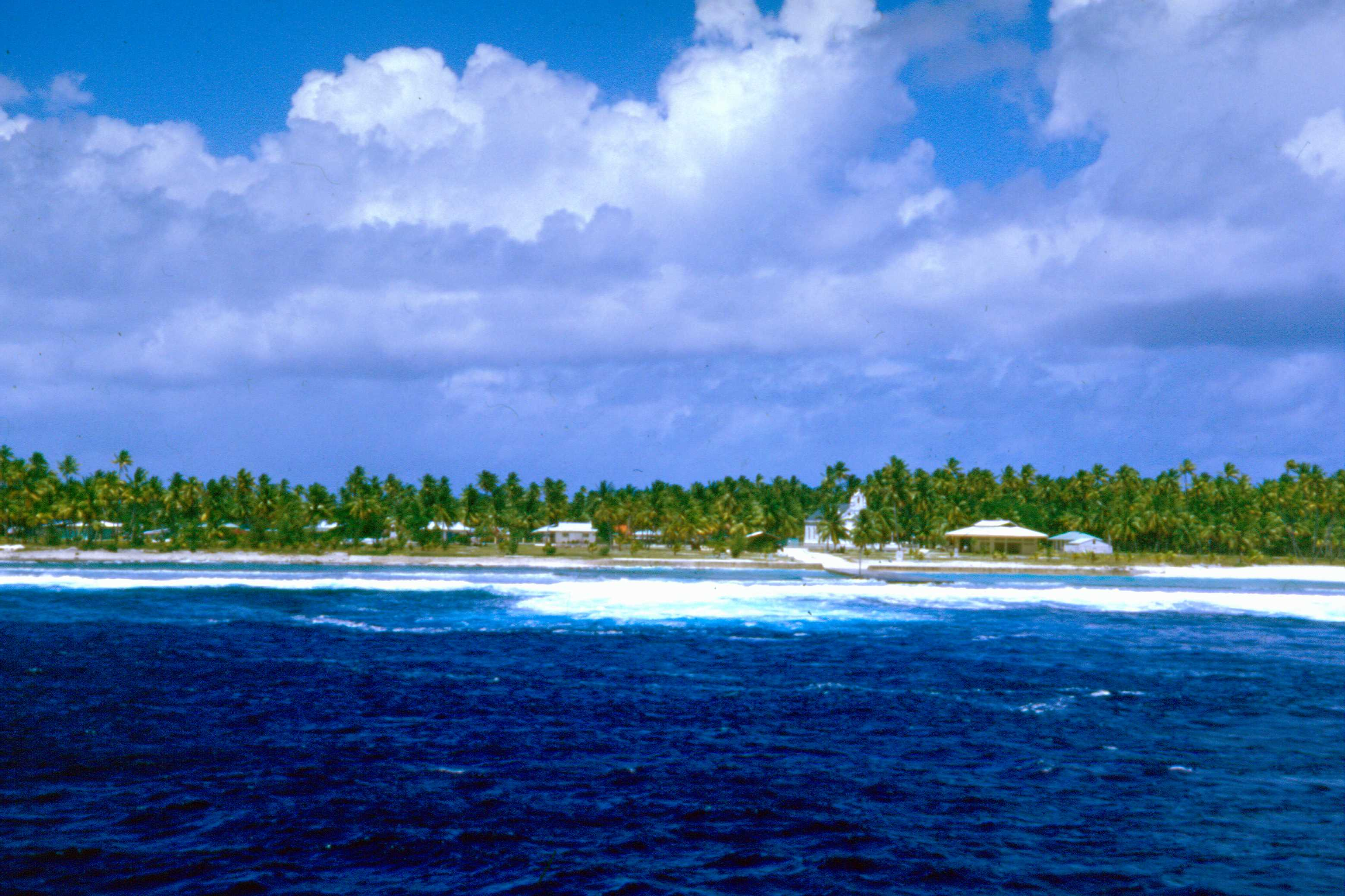
View of Marautagaroa

Pukarua, sometimes also listed as "Pukaruha" (especially on French maps), is a coral atoll in the eastern Tuamotu Archipelago. The nearest atoll, Reao, is located 48 km east-southeast of Pukarua.

Pukarua Atoll is 17 km long and its maximum width is 4.5 km. It has a long island on its northeastern reef, shaped somewhat like a fish hook, as well as a number of small islands. The atoll is surrounded by a coral reef without a proper passage. There is a pier from which small to medium-sized ships can be launched. The only village is Marautagaroa, populated by about 100 inhabitants.

The atoll's lagoon is interesting for snorkelers because of the presence of giant clams.

== History ==
Flag of Reao Pukaruha

Pukarua Atoll was first visited by Europeans in 1797, when British mariner James Wilson was sailing from Tongatapu to the Marquesas on the ship Duff. He found Pukarua uninhabited, but saw the tokens of former occupancy. Wilson named Pukarua "Searle Island" after a friend he had in the Transport office in England.

Thirty years later another British explorer, Frederick Beechey, found Pukarua inhabited by Polynesians.

== Administration ==
Pukarua Atoll is administratively part of the commune of Reao.

== Transport ==
The atoll is served by the Pukarua Airport (IATA: PUK, ICAO: NTGQ). Inaugurated in 1979, the runway was extended from 900 to 1200m in April 2006.
