= Peter Hagerstein =

19th century Finnish sailor and soldier

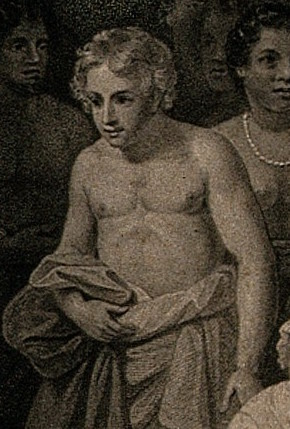
- Peter Hagerstein (detail from Smirke's painting)
- Born: Pehr Hagersten (unconfirmed); 1757; Helsinki
- Died: 1810 (aged 53); Papeete
- Other names: 'Peter the Swede'
- Citizenship: Swedish
- Occupations: Sailor, soldier, translator, advisor
- Years active: c. 1793 - 1810
- Known for: Advisor to the Kings of Tahiti

Peter Hagerstein (born 1757 Helsinki - died 1810 Papeete) was a Swedish/Finnish sailor, soldier and interpreter, known primarily for his years working as an official in the Kingdom of Tahiti.

== Background ==
Hagerstein was born in Helsinki in 1757, at a time when Finland was part of Sweden; therefore his nationality can be described as both Swedish and Finnish, but in some sources he is instead only described as a Swedish citizen.

It is possible that 'Peter Hagerstein' was not his name at birth, but was anglicised when he became a sailor; his original name may have been Pehr Hagersten.

Not much is known of his early life, until he was hired as a deckhand on the British merchant ship HMS Daedalus when it called in the port of Helsinki around 1790. Shortly afterwards, Daedalus joined the Vancouver Expedition of 1791-1795 as a support ship, with Hagerstein in the crew. He sailed with the ship from England, around Cape Horn to Hawaii, Nootka Island in British Columbia, and eventually to Tahiti.

== Tahiti years ==
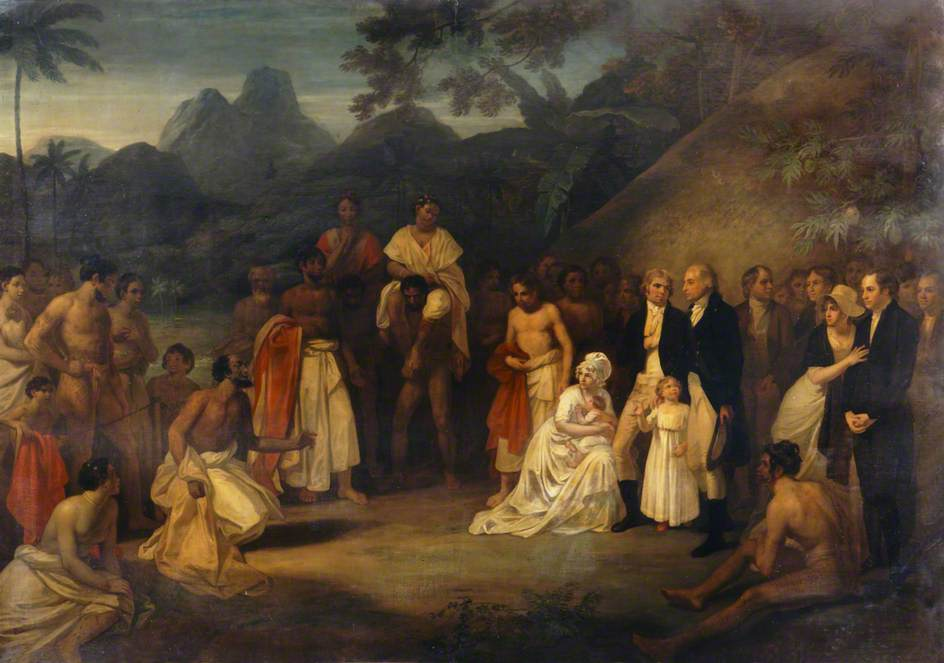
The Cession of the District of Matavai, by Robert Smirke

In February 1793, Hagerstein deserted Daedalus in Tahiti, and is on record as having 'gone native', eventually learning the Tahitian language, marrying a local woman and settling down. He is described in various sources as having made his living initially as a beachcomber.

Thanks to his language skills and understanding of western culture, Hagerstein found a role as translator/interpreter and influential advisor to Kings Pōmare I and Pōmare II, mediating and assisting the Kings in dealing with traders, missionaries and other visitors. He is portrayed in a central position in the painting The Cession of the District of Matavai in the Island of Otaheite to Captain James Wilson for the use of the Missionaries Sent Thither by that Society in the Ship Duff, by Robert Smirke, commemorating a land grant for the building of a mission in Tahiti.

His knowledge of firearms led to Hagerstein also becoming involved in the King's military, and he was eventually promoted to the position of chief warrior.

Later on Hagerstein appears to have fallen out of favour with King Pōmare II, to the extent where he considered switching his allegiance to a rival chief. He nevertheless remained associated with the King.

He had at least one child of his own with a local woman, and looked after two other children.

Peter Hagerstein died in Tahiti in 1810, possibly from complications arising from elephantiasis, which had afflicted him for long.
