= Ogea monarch =

Conservation status
- Near Threatened (IUCN 3.1)

Scientific classification
- Kingdom: Animalia
- Phylum: Chordata
- Class: Aves
- Order: Passeriformes
- Family: Monarchidae
- Genus: Mayrornis
- Species: M. versicolor

Binomial name
- Mayrornis versicolor Mayr, 1933

Species of bird

The Ogea monarch or versicolored monarch (Mayrornis versicolor) is a species of bird in the family Monarchidae. It is endemic to two islands, Ogea Driki and Ogea Levu, in the Lau Group of south eastern Fiji.

Its natural habitat is subtropical or tropical moist lowland forests. The species is little known, it feeds on insects and is thought to breed around July. Alternate names for the Ogea monarch include the Fiji versicolored monarch, Mayr's flycatcher, Ogea flycatcher and versicolored flycatcher.

== Status ==
The species is not thought to be threatened by habitat loss, instead it is considered vulnerable due to its tiny range and the prospect of introduced predators hunting it. It has been proposed that extra populations be established on other islands to act as a safeguard.
