= James Wilson (explorer) =

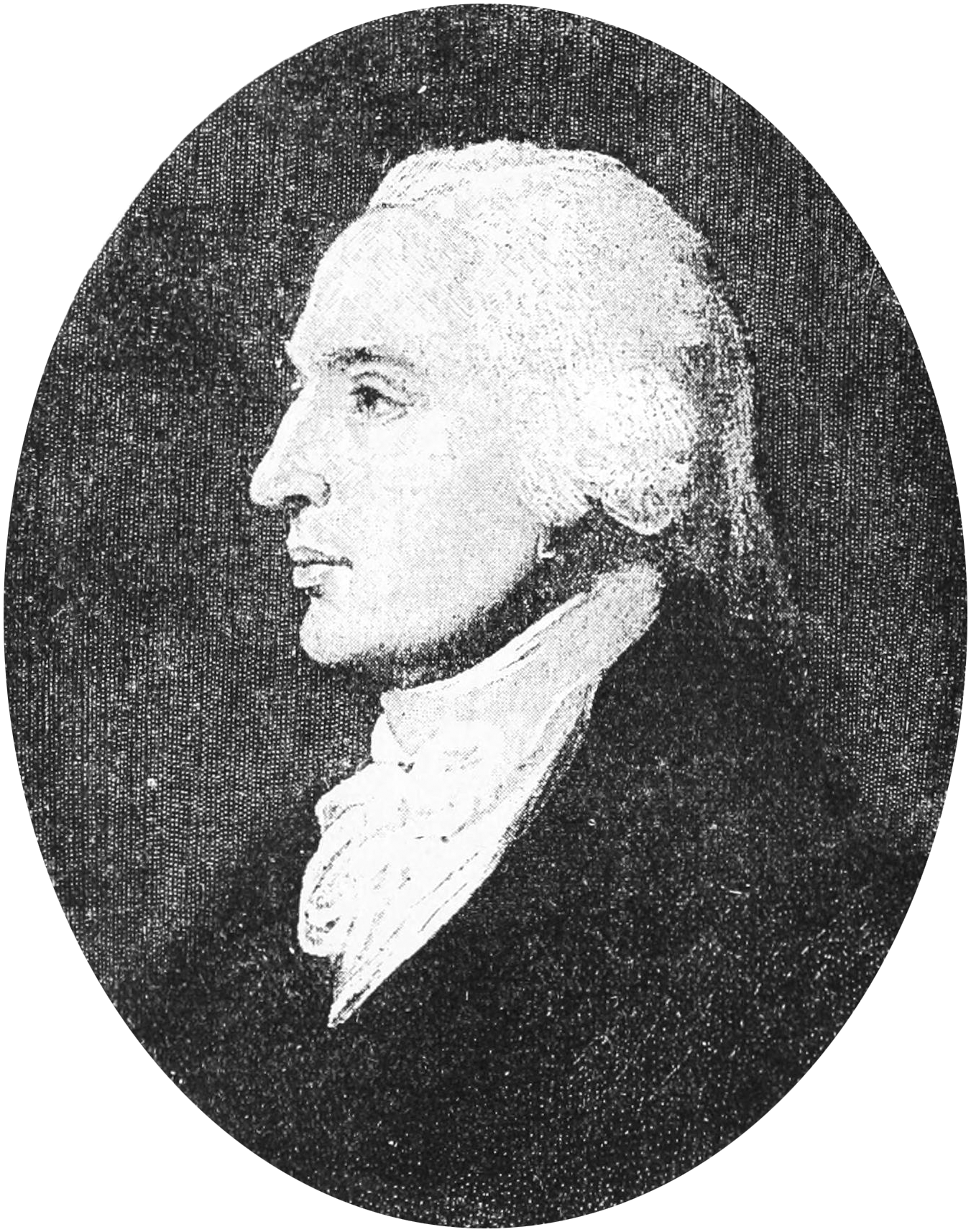

Captain James Wilson (1760–1814), commanded the British ship Duff, which the London Missionary Society contracted in 1797 to convey a team of missionaries (consisting of thirty men, six women, and three children) to their postings in Tahiti, Tonga, and the Marquesas Islands.

== Life ==
Wilson was born in 1760. He had been a British soldier during the American War of Independence and then he had worked for the East India Company. He had been an adventurer who was noted for not being religious. Eventually he had enough money to retire and it was during his retirement that he was converted to Christianity. He heard of the formation of a missionary society via the Evangelical Magazine. His track record made him the focus of their efforts. Thomas Haweis who had inspired the creation of missionaries was particularly supportive. The objective was to send missionaries to the South Seas. Wilson had volunteered to lead such a journey and this offer was accepted in September 1795. It was Wilson who suggested that they should buy a boat and he found the Duff which was 264 tons and enabled the London Missionary Society to plan for a large number of missionaries. The proposed missionary group could include artisans so that the group could model their civilisation and be resistant to a small number of deaths. It was agreed to send then to Tahiti and if possible Tonga and the Marquesas Islands.

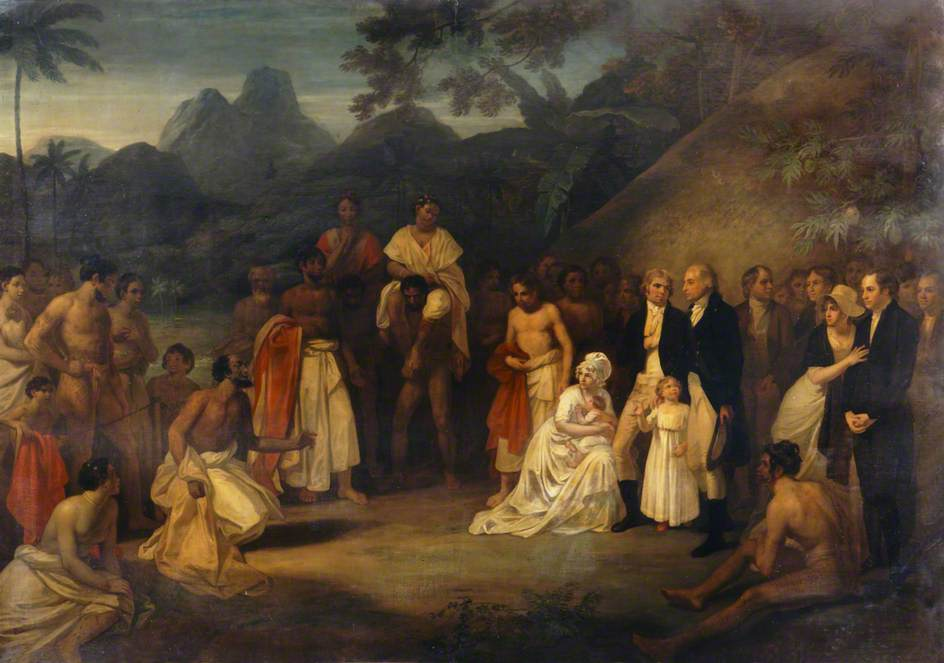
The Cession of the District of Matavai in the Island of Otaheite to Captain James Wilson for the use of the Missionaries by or after Robert Smirk

The Duff set sail in 1797. During the voyage, Wilson also surveyed (or confirmed the locations of) numerous islands in the Pacific, including Vanua Balavu, Fulaga and Ogea Levu in Fiji, Mangareva in the Gambier Islands, Pukarua in the Tuamotus, and Satawal, Elato, and Lamotrek, in the Caroline Islands.

Three years after the establishment of the British mission in Tahiti, the directors of the Society appointed a committee to consider a suitable memorial for presentation to Wilson for his services in helping to establish the first mission in the South Seas.

He published an account of his voyage: A Missionary Voyage to the Southern Pacific Ocean in 1799. This added to the idea that Wilson was the hero and his reputation overshadowed that of the missionaries and the Polynesians.
