= Duff (1794 ship) =

British merchant ship 1794–1799

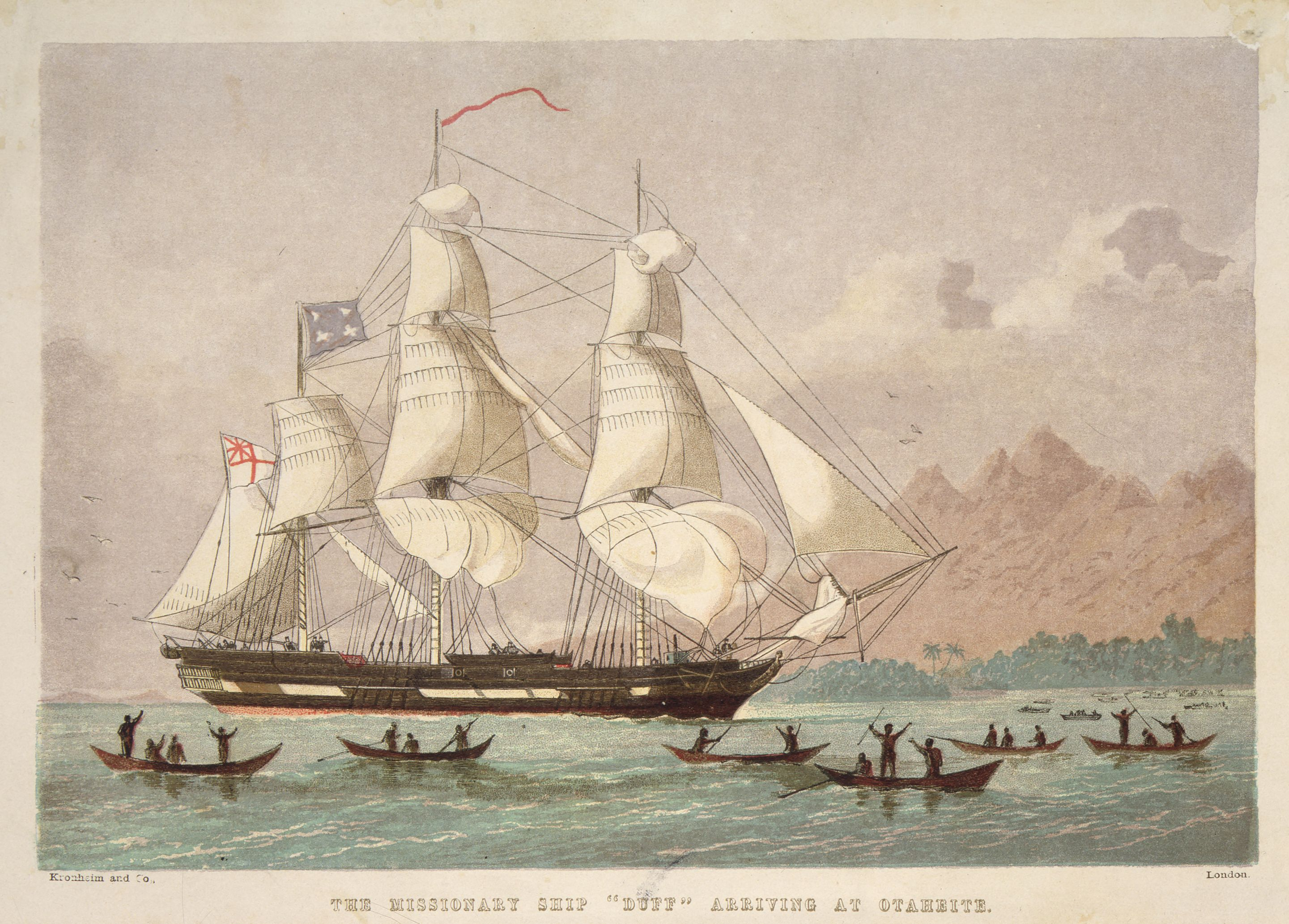
- The missionary ship Duff arriving at Otaheite in 1797

History

Great Britain
- Name: Duff
- Owner: 1795:J. Carbine; 1796:Cox & Co.
- Builder: Peter Everitt Mestaer, King and Queen Dock, Rotherhithe
- Launched: 3 March 1794
- Fate: Captured 1799

General characteristics
- Type: Ship
- Tons burthen: 267 (bm)
- Propulsion: Sail
- Complement: 18 crew
- Armament: 1797: 10 × 6-pounder guns

Duff was a ship launched on the Thames in 1794. In 1796 the London Missionary Society engaged her to take a party of missionaries to the South Pacific. Once she had landed the missionaries she sailed to China and took a cargo back to England for the British East India Company. On this voyage her captain named a variety of South Pacific islands. On her second voyage to deliver missionaries a French privateer captured her in 1799 off the coast of Brazil on the outward-bound leg of her voyage.

== First voyage ==
Duff was originally under the command of P. Gordon, with owner J. Carbine and traded between London and Gibraltar.

In 1795 the just formed London Missionary Society decided to send missionaries to the South Pacific. Captain James Wilson volunteered his services and the society was able to afford to purchase Duff. Lloyd's Register for 1796 shows that Wilson replaced Gordon as master of Duff, and Cox & Co. replaced J. Carbine as owner. Also, her trade changed to London-Port Jackson. By 1797, her trade was London-South Seas. (Note: Although some researchers inferred from this that Duff was a whaler, she was not.)

The London Missionary Society instructed Wilson to deliver a group of missionaries and their families (consisting of thirty men, six women, and three children) to their postings in Tahiti, Tonga, and the Marquesas Islands. Captain Wilson and Duff left The Downs on 13 August 1796 and by 12 November she was at Rio de Janeiro. On 6 March 1797 she reached Matavai (Mahina), where 14 missionaries and their families disembarked. Duff next delivered nine volunteers to Tongatapu on 26 March. One left immediately, and over time the locals killed three.

While sailing from Tongatapu to the Marquesas, Wilson became the first European to visit Pukarua, which he found uninhabited and named Searle Island. On 24 May Wilson he sighted Mangareva in the Gambier Islands, which he named for James Gambier, then a Lord Commissioner of the Admiralty. The largest land feature on Mangareva is named Mount Duff. At Mangareva Duff stopped at Rikitea. Wilson was the first European to visit Temoe in the Gambiers, which he named "Crescent Island".

By 5 June Duff was at Resolution Bay, in the Marquesas. (Note: Resolution Bay (Vaitahu), is on Santa Christina Island (Tahuata). Captain James Cook anchored there in 1773 during his second voyage to the Pacific and named it for Resolution, his flagship on that voyage.) Here Duff landed William Pascoe Crook. On 6 July Duff was at Matavai again and was at Tahiti by 18 July. On 18 August she was back at Tonga. From there Wilson and Duff sailed for China, arriving on 13 December at Whampoa. On this voyage Wilson charted the location of a number of islands. In the Caroline Islands he visited Satawal, Elato, and Lamotrek. In the Fiji Islands Wilson also charted Vanua Balavu, Fulaga, and Ogea Levu. In the Santa Cruz Islands, now part of Solomon Islands, Duff is remembered by the Duff Islands, charted on 25 September 1797.

Duff left China 5 Jan 1798 and reached Malacca on 16 January, the Cape of Good Hope on 17 March, and St Helena on 15 April. She was at Cork on 24 June, and arrived at Long Reach on 10 July.

== Second voyage and loss ==
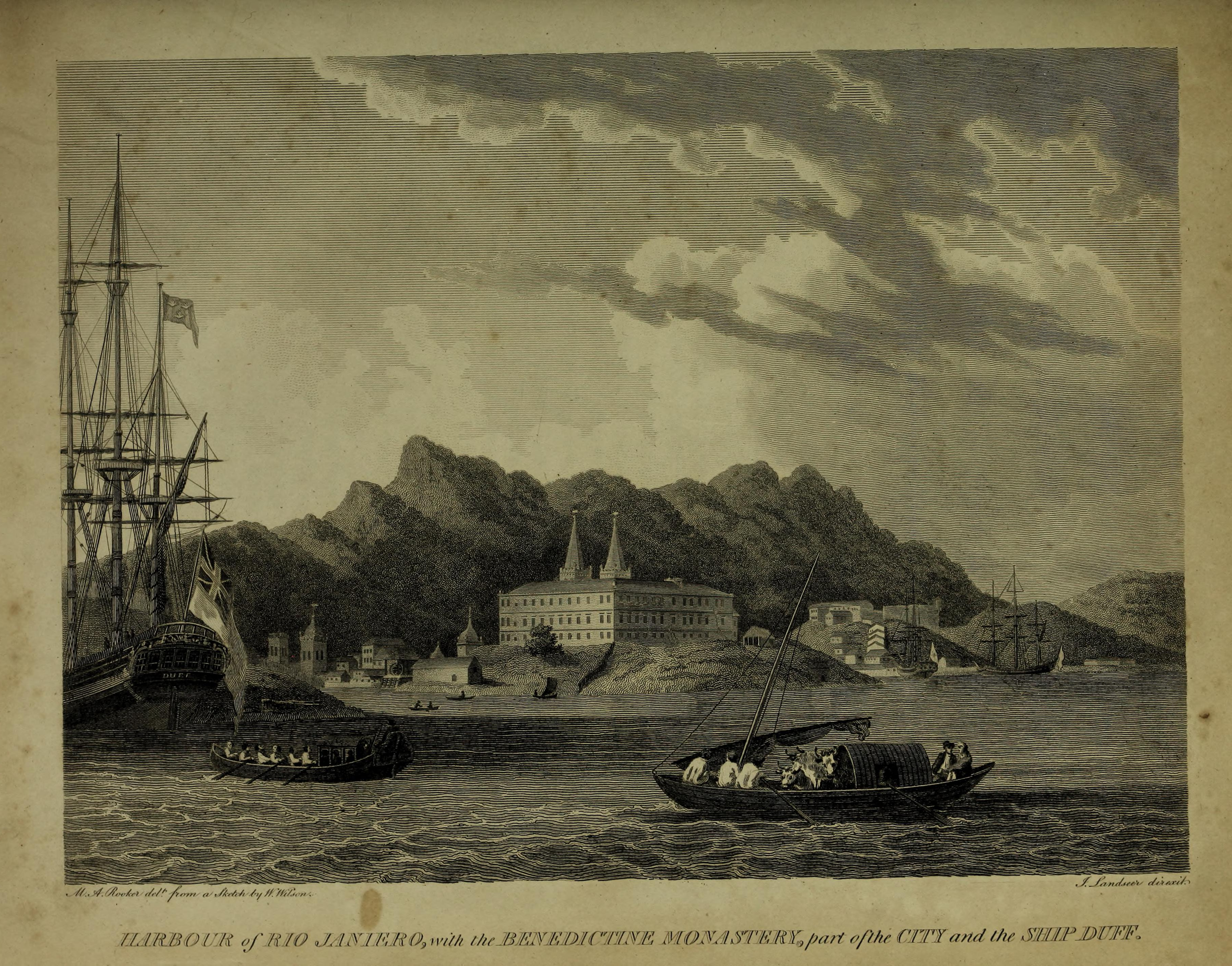
Duff at Rio Janiero (sic) in 1799

Captain Thomas Robson and Duff left Britain on 20 December 1798. She was carrying a second group of 30 missionaries (among them Clark Bentom), for the South Pacific.

The French privateer Grande Buonaparte captured Duff on 19 February 1799 off Cape Frio near Rio de Janeiro. (Note: Grande Buonaparte was a privateer from Bordeaux commissioned by Sallanche and Sorbé in 1798. A little under a year earlier a Grande Buonaparte, a privateer of 22 guns and 200 men, had captured Ulysses, which HMS St Fiorenzo had recaptured.) Her captors took Duff to Montevideo, Uruguay, where they released her crew and passengers. The missionaries finally arrived back at London on 5 October 1799.

Her captors sold Duff. Subsequently, Portuguese privateers captured Duff, only to lose her to French privateers. Her subsequent fate is currently unknown.
