= Ogea Levu =

Coordinates: 19°9′S 178°25′W

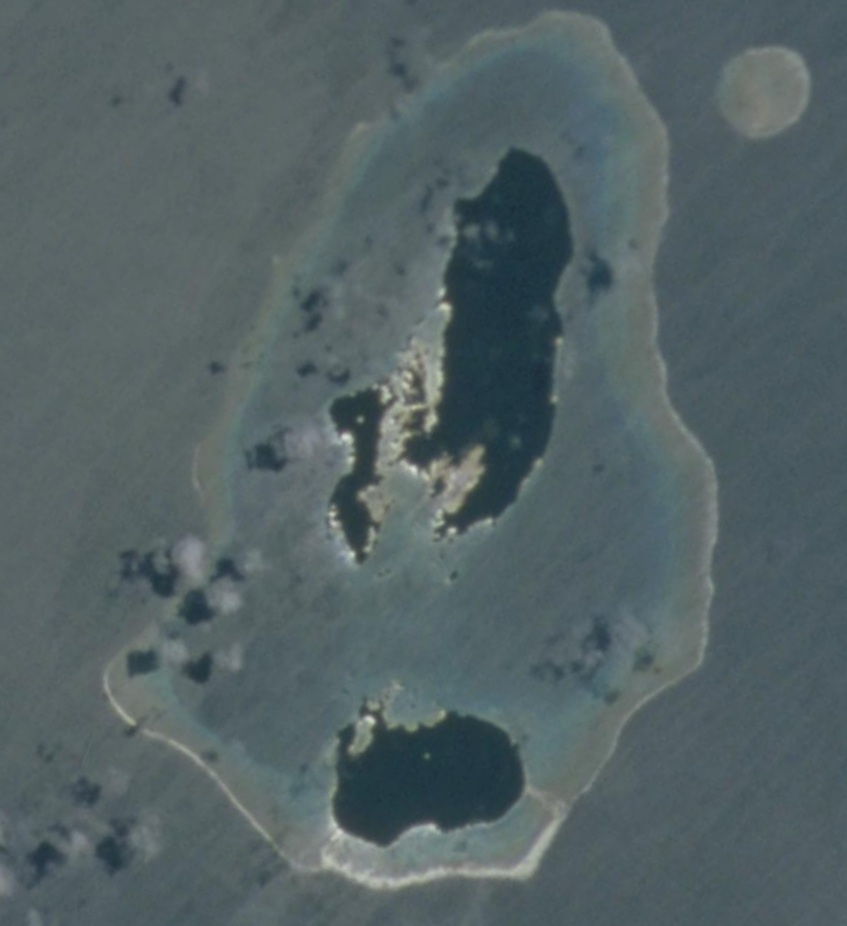
- NASA astronaut image of Ogea Driki (bottom) and Ogea Levu (top)

- Location within Fiji

Geography
- Location: Koro Sea; South Pacific Ocean
- Archipelago: Southern Lau Islands
- Area: 13.3 km^{2} (5.1 sq mi)
- Highest elevation: 82 m (269 ft)

Administration
- Fiji
- Division: Eastern Division
- Province: Lau
- District: Vulaga

Ogea Levu (pronounced [oˈŋea ˈleβu]) is a coral island on a barrier reef in Fiji's Southern Lau archipelago. With an area of 13.3 square kilometres (3,300 acres), it is situated at 19.18° South and 178.47° West, 10 kilometres (6.2 miles) east of Fulaga. It has a maximum altitude of 82 metres (270 ft).

A 1,830 hectares (4,500 acres) area covering both Ogea Levu and nearby Ogea Driki is the Ogea Important Bird Area. The Important Bird Area covers the entire range of the near threatened Ogea monarch. The makatea forest and Ogea monarch habitat of the island contribute to its national significance as outlined in Fiji's Biodiversity Strategy and Action Plan.

The people of Ogea are known for their happy and carefree approach to life, yet they also work hard in their daily lives, mainly in planting root crops, and fishing in their rich fishing grounds around both their islands which are surrounded by magnificent reefs and coral atolls. The chief of Ogea is traditionally known as the Matua Tabu i Tui Nayau, Tui Ogea (Sacred Elder of the Tui Nayau, the Tui Ogea).
