= William Pascoe Crook =

English missionary (1775–1846)

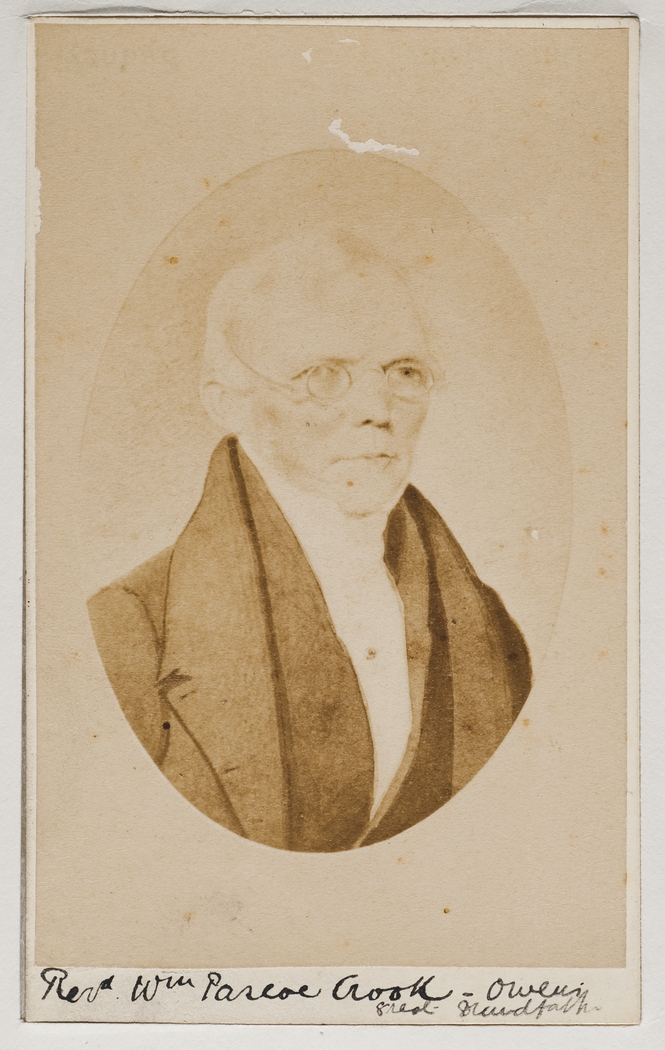
- William Pascoe Crook, c. 1840
- Born: 29 April 1775; Dartmouth, Devon, England
- Died: 14 June 1846 (aged 71); Melbourne
- Occupations: Missionary, schoolmaster and pastor

William Pascoe Crook (1775–1846), a missionary, schoolmaster and Congregational pastor. He was born in Dartmouth, Devon, England on 29 April 1775. As a young man, he was described as a "Gentleman's servant." From 1797 to 1799, he was the first missionary to live in the Marquesas Islands and learn the language. He returned to England in 1799, married, and in 1803 sailed to Australia where he founded the first boarding school and became a Christian minister and evangelist. As a missionary he returned to Polynesia, sailing to Tahiti in 1816. He became the pastor of a church. In 1830, he returned to Australia, founded a girls' school, and preached throughout the country. He died in 1846.

He was responsible for the raising and education of Pōmare III, the infant King of Tahiti who died prematurely in 1827. He is believed to be the first translator of the Bible into Polynesian.

== Marquesas ==
Polynesia

On 29 July 1796, Crook sailed from England as a member of the first group of Protestant missionaries sent to Polynesia to attempt to Christianize the Polynesian people. Within the group of 30 male missionaries (and five wives and three children), Crook's occupation was listed as "Gentleman's servant and since tin worker." On their arrival to the Marquesas Islands the plan was for Crook and John Harris, a cooper, to be left on Tahuata island to create a Christian mission. One night spent on the island persuaded Harris to back out of the endeavor, and, on 24 June 1797, the sailing ship Duff departed and left Crook alone on the island with the Marquesans.

Crook had a difficult time on Tahuata. He discovered that war among tribes was endemic, the breadfruit crop failed and a famine ensued, and he was treated with contempt. He was shocked by the liberal sexual practices of the natives and too modest to adopt the usual male dress of a loin cloth. Instead he dressed as a female with a wrap around cloth. On 22 May 1798, after nearly a year on the island, he paddled out to one of the infrequent foreign ships to call at the island, and requested passage, telling the captain that he feared for his life. He wrote a letter to be delivered to his headquarters in London citing his disorienting experiences, the "temptations" he encountered (presumably sexual), and his conviction that "a garrison" of missionaries would be necessary to convert the natives. He traveled on the ship to the larger Marquesan island of Nukuhiva and, despite his experiences on Tahuata, he left the ship and lived on Nukuhiva in better conditions until 28 January 1799 when he boarded a passing ship for England. During more than a year and one half on the islands, he had not converted a single person to Christianity, but he had learned the Marquesan language which was similar to all other Polynesian languages.

== Bibliography ==
- S. Marsden, A Letter to Mr William Crook (Sydney, 1835)
- J. Ham, A Biographical Sketch of the Life and Labours of the Late Rev. William Pascoe Crook (Melbourne, 1846)
- William Pascoe Crook, An Account of the Marquesas Islands 1797–1799, ed. Greg Dening et al. (2007) ISBN 2-904171-66-2
