= Fulaga =

Island in Fiji

Coordinates: 19°08′S 178°34′W

Native name: Vulaga
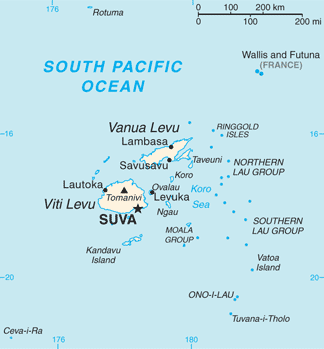

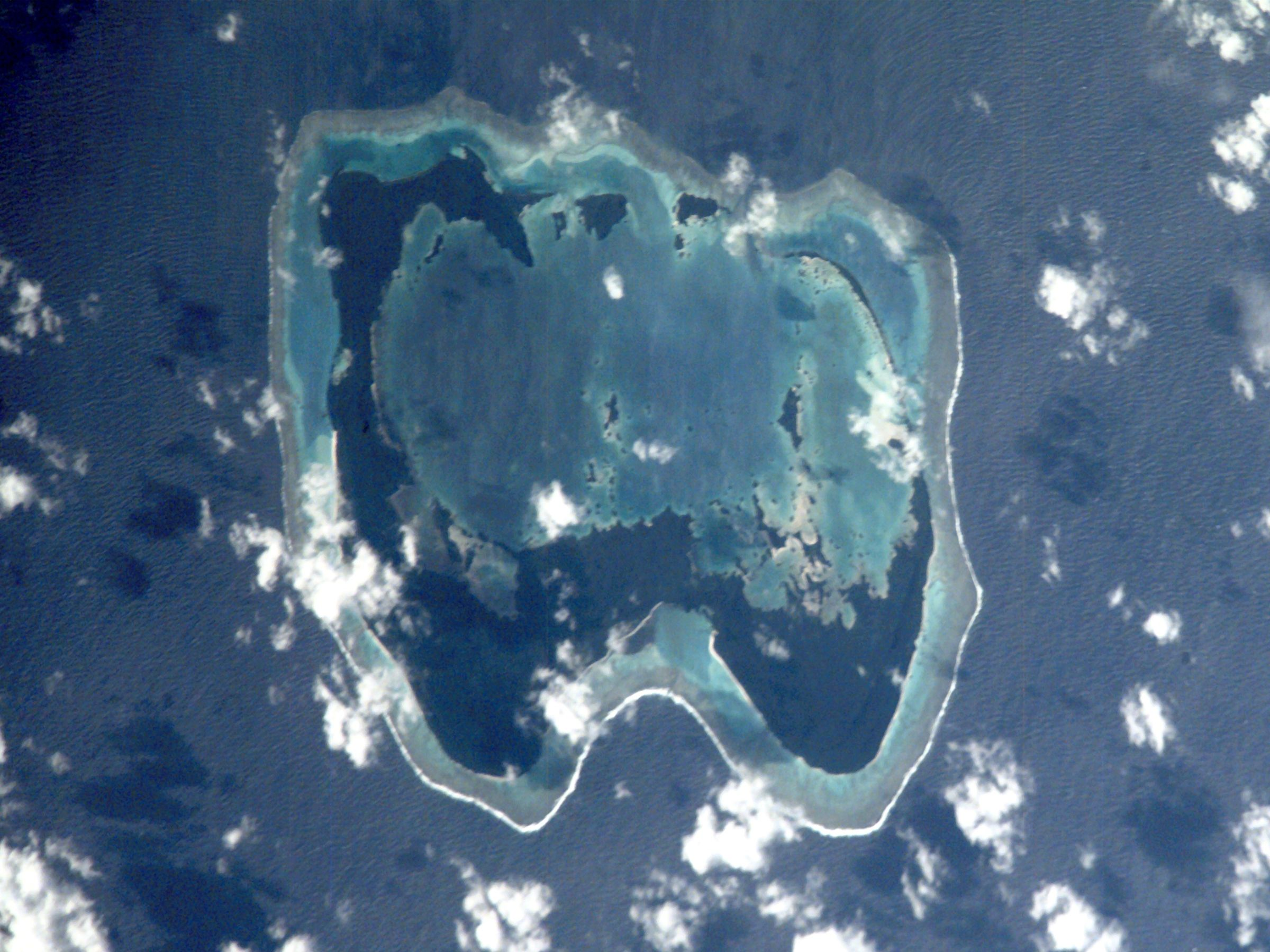

- Location within Fiji

Geography
- Location: South Pacific Ocean
- Archipelago: Southern Lau Islands
- Area: 18.5 km^{2} (7.1 sq mi)
- Highest elevation: 79 m (259 ft)

Administration
- Fiji
- Division: Eastern Division
- Province: Lau Province

Fulaga (pronounced [fuˈlaŋa]) (proper name: Vulaga) is a crescent-shaped reef-limestone island in Fiji's Southern Lau Group.

The spectacular lagoon and the fact that the island is a Pritchardia thurstonii habitat contribute to its national significance as outlined in Fiji's Biodiversity Strategy and Action Plan.

== Geography ==
Situated at 19.17° South and 178.65° West, it covers an area of 18.5 square kilometres (7.1 sq mi). It has a maximum elevation of 79 metres (259 ft). The limestone belongs to the Koroqara Limestone (Tokalau Limestone Group) and is probably Late Miocene in age. In form it is a basin which has been breached in the north, flooding the interior, which has many islets and rocks. The island thus has this unique, beautiful lagoon that adequately supplies the inhabitants with different varieties of fish and sea shells. There are three terrace levels, two with maximum elevations 55 and 40 metres (180 and 131 ft), the third being lower. There is an elevated notch 2 metres (6 ft 7 in) above mean sea level.

== Demographics ==
There are three villages: Muanaicake, Muanaira and Naividamu. The total population was almost 600 in the middle of the 20th century, but is now less than 400, due to migration to the mainland for secondary school education for children, and for employment for parents.

== In Tradition ==
The people are traditional carvers, skilled in the making of outrigger canoes and 'tanoa' (or 'kumete' in their dialect) which are wooden bowls carved out of local hardwood and used in formal and informal Yaqona Ceremonies and social gatherings across Fiji.
