= Donald Morrison =

Donald Morrison may refer to:

- Donald Morrison (missionary) (1828–1869), Canadian missionary
- Donald Morrison (outlaw) (1858–1894), Canadian outlaw
- Donald Morrison (politician) (1852–1920), merchant and political figure in the Province of New Brunswick, Canada
- Donald M. Morrison (1906–1989), United States Coast Guard admiral
- Don Morrison (ice hockey) (1923–2001), ice hockey player
- Don Morrison (American football) (1949–2025), American football offensive tackle
- Don Morrison (mountaineer) (1929–1977), British climber and mountaineer

== See also ==
- Donald Morison (1857–1924), Newfoundland lawyer, judge and politician
