= Versus de pelegrino =

12th-century Latin drama

The Versus de pelegrino or Verses about the Stranger is a medieval Latin drama composed by an anonymous playwright of Vic c. 1130. The Versus is a short piece of only forty lines on the meeting between Mary Magdalene and the glorified Jesus Christ on the road as recorded in the Gospel of John (chapter 20). It is a follow-up to the Verses pascales de tres Maries and was probably designed as a liturgical drama for Easter Vigil as well.

== Story ==
The opening lines, spoken by the Magdalene, are an adaptation of the third chapter of the Song of Songs. In the Vetus Latina and in one manuscript grouping of the Vulgate this chapter has the rubric Mariae Magdalenae ad Ecclesiam: Mary Magdalene to the Church. The Vic dramatist evidently picked up on this allegorical exegesis and adapted it to his theme. As the play opens, Mary is searching a garden for the tomb of Christ. First some angeli (angels) and then an ortolanus (gardener) ask her why she is weeping and for whom she is looking. She mistakes the gardener for Christ when he says to her "Mary, Mary, Mary!" and she responds "Raboni, raboni, master!" The drama does not incorporate a sequence of her on the road meeting Christ, but jumps to her return to the garden from meeting him. There she scoffs at the gardener who deceived her and, meeting the discipuli (disciples), relates to them the fact of Christ's resurrection and the empty tomb. The disciples do not hesitate to believe her, Marie veraci (truthful Mary), over the "whole deceitful multitude of Jews" (Iudeorum turbe fallaci). The play ends on a prayer, sung by a chorus (choir), and the Greater Doxology.

== Analysis ==
The Versus is alone among the liturgical dramas of the Middle Ages in its choice of subject matter. The Epitalamica, composed probably later that century at the Monastery of the Paraclete, is a non-dramatic treatment of the same theme, probably derived from the Versus if its relict dramatic feature are any indication.

Besides the Song of Songs and John 20, the Versus relies on the Gospel accounts of the Jews spreading lies that Christ had not risen but merely been stolen from his grave. Outside of the Bible, the anonymous dramatist borrowed a verse form from the north Italian Latin ballad Foebus abierat (c. 1000), in which a lady sees a mirage of her lover's face and embraces it only to find it disappeared. This ballad had made its way to the Abbey of Ripoll by the twelfth century and would have been accessible to a dramatist working there or at Vic. This composer also drew on an earlier twelfth-century piece, the Victimae paschali, for the scene of Mary and the disciples. This borrowing became commonplace in thirteenth-century Easter drama, but the Vic play may be its first dramatic adaptation.

The Versus is written in asclepiadic strophes, quatrains, monorhymed but with lines of varying length. The music for the play survives (the whole thing was sung) in Aquitainian neumes and its melodic structure mirrors its poetic. The play is preserved along with the Verses pascales in codex 105 of the Episcopal Museum of Vic.

== Critical editions ==
- Anglès, Higini (1935), La música a Catalunya fins al segle XIII (Barcelona), pp. 275–81.
- Donovan, R. B. (1958), Liturgical Drama in Medieval Spain (Toronto), pp. 78–81, 85, with Martí de Riquer i Morera.
- Dronke, Peter (1994), Nine Medieval Latin Plays, Cambridge Medieval Classics, I (Cambridge), pp. 83–101.
- Lipphart, W. (1976), Lateinische Osterfeiern und Osterspiele, volume 5 (Berlin–New York), pp. 1663–8.
- Young, Karl (1933), The Drama of the Medieval Church, volume 1 (Oxford), pp. 678–81.
