= Epsom Girls' Grammar School =

State secondary school in Auckland, New Zealand

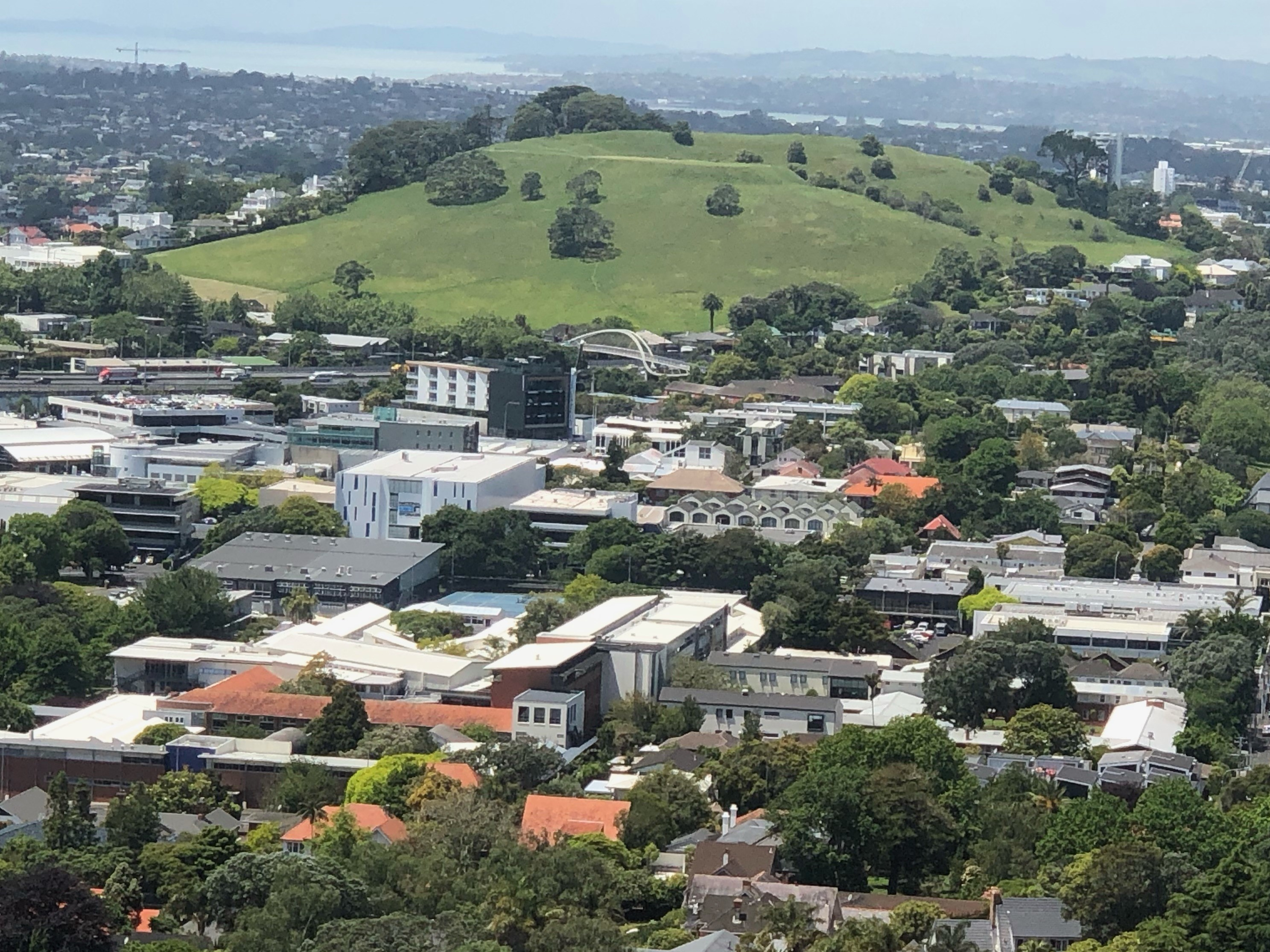
- Epsom Girls' Grammar School and Ōhinerau / Mount Hobson seen from Maungawhau / Mount Eden

Location
- Silver Road, Epsom, Auckland, New Zealand; 36°52′38″S 174°46′28″E

Information
- Type: State Single Sex Girls Secondary (Year 9–13) with Boarding Facilities
- Motto: Latin: Per Angusta, Ad Augusta (Through difficulties to greatness.)
- Established: 12 February 1917
- Sister school: Auckland Grammar School
- Ministry of Education Institution no.: 64
- Principal: Brenda McNaughton
- Enrolment: 2,316 (July 2026)
- Colours: Navy and gold
- Socio-economic decile: 9Q
- Website: Epsom Girls Grammar School

Epsom Girls Grammar School (often simplified to Epsom Girls, or EGGS) is a state secondary school for girls ranging from years 9 to 13 in Auckland, New Zealand. It has a roll of nearly 2,300 as of 2026, making it one of the largest schools in New Zealand.

The principal is Brenda McNaughton, the 12th principal, who succeeded Lorraine Pound in 2024. She succeeds a long line of distinguished educators such as Margaret Bendall and Marjory Adams.

== History ==
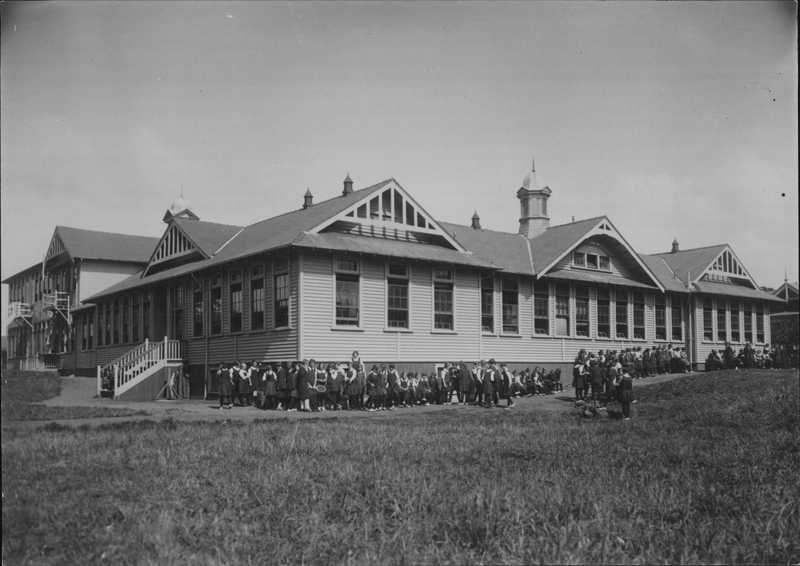
Epsom Girls' Grammar School in 1926

Epsom Girls Grammar School was established through an endowment of land in 1850 and officially opened on 12 February 1917 with 174 students. Establishing Epsom Girls was described as a "struggle", as "despite a clear need for a second girls’ school in Auckland, education administrators continued to prioritise boys’ education. Eventually EGGS emerged as an old, adapted Villa and a handful of classrooms on the Silver Road site. When the doors opened in 1917 the School had already exceeded capacity."

Boarding facilities are provided on-site at Epsom House, providing full accommodation for 150 students from overseas and rural New Zealand.

The Old Girls Association was established in 1921, and holds a number of events each year for alumnae.

In 2021, Metro (magazine) reported that Epsom Girls Grammar School was the top performing non-religious state school in Auckland over the last five years (based on Ministry of Education data of the five-year average of university entrance attainment).

Property prices in the Epsom Girls Grammar School and Auckland Grammar School school zones (known as the "double Grammar zone") are particularly high - Epsom Girls is the second most expensive school zone to buy in within Auckland (with the first being Auckland Grammar School). The zone covers large swathes of four of the city’s highest value suburbs – Remuera, Epsom, Parnell and Mount Eden. Real estate agents have commented that being in the "double Grammar zone" could add up to $500,000 to the value of a family home.

== Enrolment ==
As of July 2026, Epsom Girls' Grammar School has a roll of 2,316 students, of which 216 (9.3%) identify as Māori.

As of 2026, the school has an Equity Index of 402, placing it amongst schools whose students have the fewest socioeconomic barriers to achievement (roughly equivalent to deciles 9 and 10 under the former socio-economic decile system).

== Principals ==
- Annie Christina Morrison 1917–1929
- Agnes L. Laudon 1930–1947
- Margaret G. Johnston 1948–1952
- Marjory F.E. Adams 1953–1970
- Alisa M. Blakey 1970–1979
- Gaewyn E. Griffiths 1979–1988
- Verna E. Dowdle 1988–1996
- Margaret A. Bendall 1996–2004
- Annette Sharp 2005–2008
- Madeline J. Gunn 2008–2016
- Lorraine Pound 2016–2023
- Brenda McNaughton 2024–present

== Notable alumnae ==
Media and the arts

- Deidre Airey – ceramic artist
- Petra Bagust – television presenter
- Ruth Castle – weaver
- Chaii – rapper and songwriter
- Angela D'Audney – television news anchor
- Jude Dobson – television presenter
- Eve de Castro-Robinson – composer
- Hinemoa Elder – youth forensic psychiatrist and former television presenter
- Kate Elliott (actress) – television and film actress
- Tui Flower – food writer
- Rosalie Gascoigne – sculptor and artist
- May Gilbert – printmaker and artist
- Lisa Harrow – actress
- Kate Hawkesby – television presenter and radio broadcaster
- Hayley Holt – television presenter
- Rowena Jackson MBE – ballerina and later artistic director of the New Zealand Ballet Company
- Florence Myrtle Keene – historian and author
- Yvonne Lawley – actress
- Tianyi Lu – orchestral conductor
- Marya Martin – flautist
- Ingrun Helgard Moeckel – German model and Miss Germany winner
- Hannah O'Neill – principal ballerina at the Paris Opera Ballet
- Susan Moller Okin – feminist philosopher
- Charlotte Piho – Cook Islands photographer
- Wilma Smith – lead violinist in the Melbourne Symphony Orchestra
- Freda Stark – dancer
- Rima Te Wiata – comedian and actress
- Olivia Tennet – actress, dancer
- Konai Helu Thaman – poet and academic
- Karen Walker – fashion designer
- Lois White – artist
- Robin White (artist) – painter and printmaker
- Dorothy Wills – architect
- Jean Wishart – former editor of the New Zealand Woman's Weekly

Public service and law

- Anna Adams (lawyer) – Solicitor-General
- Helen Clark – 37th Prime Minister of New Zealand and former administrator of the United Nations Development Programme
- Miriam Dell – President, National Council of Women
- Jeanette Fitzsimons – politician and former co-leader of the Green Party of Aotearoa New Zealand
- Ngapare Hopa – Māori academic and former member of the Waitangi Tribunal
- Dorothy Jelicich – Member of Parliament for Hamilton West (1972–1975)
- Judith Potter – former High Court judge
- Charmaine Pountney – educator, rights activist
- Alison Quentin-Baxter – constitutional lawyer
- Marie Shroff – former Cabinet Secretary, Privacy Commissioner and chair of the New Zealand Electoral Commission
- Suzanne Sinclair – Member of Parliament for Titirangi (1993–1996)
- Chlöe Swarbrick – politician and co-leader of the Green Party of Aotearoa New Zealand
- Augusta Wallace – first woman appointed to the judiciary in New Zealand

Science

- Viopapa Annandale-Atherton – doctor
- Ruth Black – doctor
- Elizabeth Brown (botanist) – bryologist
- Joan Chapple – first New Zealand female plastic surgeon
- Lucy Cranwell – botanist
- Kirsten Finucane – paediatric heart surgeon, former Chief Surgeon of the Paediatric and Congenital Cardiac Service at Starship Hospital
- Barbara Heslop – immunologist
- Joan Metge – anthropologist
- Louise Nicholson (academic) – neuroscientist
- Brenda Shore – botanist

Sport

- Vera Burt – professional cricketer and field hockey player
- Suzy Dawson – rugby union coach and former member of the Black Ferns
- Taylor Flavell – professional squash player
- Kylie Foy – Olympic field hockey player
- Anna Green (footballer) – former association footballer
- Winifred Griffin – Olympic swimmer
- Andrea Hams – weightlifter and hurdler
- Maggie Jenkins – New Zealand representative footballer
- Elizabeth Lamb (athlete) – high jumper
- Annalie Longo – International and professional footballer
- Brigitta Lotu-Iiga – former member of the Black Ferns
- Jan Martin – Olympic hockey player
- Moana Manley – swimmer and Miss New Zealand winner
- Hannah McLean – former competitive swimmer
- Marnie McGuire – golfer
- Phillis Meti – professional golfer
- Melanie Hulme – softball player
- Melissa Ingram – Olympic swimmer
- Brenda Perry – tennis player and former director of the ASB Classic (tennis)
- Kayla Pratt – Olympic rower
- Kim Robertson (athlete) – track and field sprinter
- Francesca Snell – water polo player
- Jean Spencer – Olympic gymnast
- Sheryl Wells – former manager of the New Zealand national netball team
- Yvette Williams – first woman to win an Olympic gold medal for New Zealand

== See also ==
- List of schools in New Zealand
