= Kronfeld =

Kronfeld is a surname. Notable people with the surname include:

- Arthur Kronfeld (1886–1941), German psychiatrist, brother of Maria Dronke.
- Josh Kronfeld (born 1971), New Zealand rugby union player and television presenter.
- Robert Kronfeld (1904–1948), Austrian aviator.
