= Ruth Black =

New Zealand family planning doctor

Edith Ruth Black CBE (2 June 1925 – 25 November 2017; née Blumenthal) was a New Zealand doctor specialising in family planning.

== Biography ==
Black was born in Austria to Siegfried and Else Blumenthal. The family moved to England when she was a young teenager and then emigrated to New Zealand, settling in Auckland, where Black attended Epsom Girls' Grammar School.

Black attended the University of Auckland and the University of Otago, graduating with a Bachelor of Arts degree in 1948 at the age of 23. She then began studying medicince and graduated as a medical doctor in 1952 at the age of 28. Black moved back to Auckland and completed her house surgeon training at Auckland Hospital.

In 1955, Black started working for the Family Planning Association (FPA) at their first clinic in Remuera, Auckland. She was a clinic doctor from 1955 to 1976 and from 1959 to 1974 was also the medical co-director of the Auckland clinics. From 1963 to 1974, Black was chair of the NZ FPA Medical Advisory Committee and a council member of the International Planned Parenthood Federation (IPPF) of South-East Asia and Oceania.

Black died at Grace Joel Hospital aged 92, and is buried in the Hebrew area of Waikumete Cemetery.

== Personal life ==
In 1954, Black married Harry Black, who she had met while studying at Otago Medical School. They had two sons.
