= Harry Hopkins (engineer) =

New Zealand civil engineer and university professor

Henry James Hopkins OBE DFC (11 August 1912 – 9 January 1986) was a New Zealand civil engineer and university professor. He was born in Dwellingup, Western Australia, Australia on 11 August 1912.

In the 1980 New Year Honours, Hopkins was appointed an Officer of the Order of the British Empire.
