= Joy Drayton =

New Zealand educationalist and politician (1916–2012)

Dame Joy Drayton DNZM MBE
- Born: Mary Josephine Stock; 13 January 1916
- Died: 14 September 2012 (aged 96)
- Spouse: Ronald Wilfred Drayton (m. 1941; died 1984)

Dame Mary Josephine Drayton DNZM MBE (née Stock, 13 January 1916 – 14 September 2012), known as Joy Drayton, was a New Zealand teacher, academic and officeholder.

== Early life and education ==
Mary Josephine Stock was born in Dunedin in 1916 and educated at Wellington East Girls' College. She graduated from Victoria University College with a MA(Hons) in history in 1937 and went on to complete a DipEd at the same institution.

On 14 June 1941, she married Ronald Wilfred Drayton at the Vivian Street Baptist Church in Wellington.

== Education career ==
Drayton was a teacher at Wellington College from 1942 to 1944. She became principal of Tauranga Girls' College in 1959, a position she held for 22 years. During that time, she added Māori language to the curriculum, making the college the first state school to do so.

She became a member of the University of Waikato Council in 1979, and served as Chancellor from 1988 to 1991. She was a member of the Hamilton Teachers' College Council from 1986 to 1991.

== Political career ==
Drayton was a Tauranga City Councillor from 1985 to 1992, having entered local-body politics campaigning for the building of a new city library. She was the deputy mayor of Tauranga between 1986 and 1989. She was a regional councillor on Environment Bay of Plenty from 1992 to 1998, including three years as deputy chair from 1992 to 1995.

== Other activities ==
Drayton also served on the executive committee of the New Zealand Historic Places Trust (1986–1998) and the executive of the Tauranga branch of the National Council of Women (1987–91). She was the chair of the Bay of Plenty Women's Refuge from 1982 to 1986.

== Honours ==
In 1993, Drayton received an honorary doctorate from the University of Waikato.

Drayton was appointed a Member of the Order of the British Empire, for services to education and the community, in the 1980 New Year Honours. In the 2000 New Year Honours, she was appointed a Companion of the New Zealand Order of Merit, for services to local government and the community. She was subsequently promoted to Distinguished Companion of the New Zealand Order of Merit in the 2005 New Year Honours, for services to education and local-body affairs, and in 2009 she accepted redesignation as a Dame Companion of the New Zealand Order of Merit following the reintroduction of titular honours by the New Zealand government.

== Death ==
Drayton died in Tauranga on 14 September 2012, aged 96.
