= Verses pascales de tres Maries =

The Verses pascales de tres Maries (Easter Verses of the Three Maries) are 12th-century Latin lyric verses from Vic that form a liturgical drama for performance at Easter. The play, by an anonymous cleric, is highly original in content and form, though it only runs 94 lines.

== Story ==
The three Maries of the title are Mary Magdalene, Mary, mother of James and John, and Mary Salome. The play is based on Mark 16, wherein the three women visit the tomb of Jesus with spices to anoint his body. The play is not merely a reproduction of the biblical account but includes an apocryphal scene with a merchant. The three women approach the merchant in order to buy a spice so powerful it will preserve Christ's physical beauty forever. When they find the potion among the merchant's wares, however, he asks for a very high price, which Mary Magdalene promptly pays. According to Peter Dronke, the rubric ".a.", which appears in the original manuscripts at certain points, indicates that the following lines, usually explanatory, prophetic, or comforting, are sung by an angel. In the angel's scene in lines 53–69, he is seen by the three women after the stone that covered the tomb has obviously been removed. The women rejoice and the angel sends them on their way to tell the still-lamenting apostles. The scenes which follow are a contradiction which modern scholarship has not yet resolved. The women are again lamenting and have apparently not visited the tomb. The dramatist may not have even attempted to create an orderly narrative, or perhaps the joyful scenes with the angel are to be interpreted as a sort of prophetic dream.

The three Maries visit the tomb for a second time, where the angel confronts them and asks Quem queritis?: Whom are you looking for? The Magdalene alone answers and the three women are told that he has risen and to go proclaim it. The play ends in a singing of the Te deum.

== Manuscript ==
The Verses pascales are contained in a codex in the Episcopal Museum of Vic originally copied probably in the Vic scriptorium between the 11th and 13th centuries. They were copied on two blank pages in or around the 1160s, but contain errors which point to a much earlier date of original composition; probably closer to c. 1130. The melody for all but lines 43–84 is preserved in the manuscript in Aquitainian notation on single-line staves. The music has been fully studied by Eva Castro Caridad in Tropos y troparios hispánicos (Santiago de Compostela, 1991).

== Influence ==
The Verses pascales are followed in the manuscript by another short drama, the Versus de pelegrino, composed by the same person from Vic and also concentrating on Mary Magdalene.

Lines 32–66 form five strophes, each line of the first ending in a, each of the second in e, of the third in i, the fourth in o, and the fifth in u. This strophic, alphabetic vowel-based rhyme scheme is entirely unique in medieval literature. Dronke calls it a "virtuous invention". It found its way to Austria by the end of the century and was used by Walther von der Vogelweide for a German lament of the passing of summer, Diu welt was gelf, rôt unde blâ.

Der Marner, a disciple of Walther, repeated the theme and the rhyme in the Latin Iam dudum estivalia, where winter represents the cooling of love. This latter poem is preserved among the Carmina Burana and explains the path by which the theme of Mary and the Merchant could make its way to the Tyrol and the Ludus de passione (passion play) of the Carmina Burana.

== Critical editions ==
- Anglès, Higini (1935), La música a Catalunya fins al segle XIII (Barcelona), pp. 275–81.
- Donovan, R. B. (1958), The Liturgical Drama in Medieval Spain (Toronto), pp. 78–81, 85.
- Dronke, Peter (1994), Nine Medieval Latin Plays, Cambridge Medieval Classics, I (Cambridge), pp. 83–101.
- Lipphart, W. (1976), Lateinische Osterfeiern und Osterspiele, volume 5 (Berlin–New York), pp. 1663–8.
- Young, Karl (1933), The Drama of the Medieval Church, volume 1 (Oxford), pp. 678–81.
