= Foebus abierat =

Medieval Latin poem

Foebus abierat ("Phoebus had gone") is a medieval Latin poem, authorship unknown, composed near the end of the 10th century in Northern Italy. Described as "hauntingly beautiful" and "one of the joys of medieval poetry," it is an erotic dream-vision lyric spoken by a woman who grieves the departure of her lover Phoebus, brother of the Moon. Although the language is ecclesiastical Latin, none of its content is explicitly Christian. M.B. Pranger reads the poem as "though containing allusions to the Song of Songs, is unambiguously profane in its meaning."

An English translation of Foebus abierat by the Irish poet Eavan Boland was published in the April 2008 issue of Poetry magazine. Boland describes the poem as the "long-ago cry of a woman finding and losing a body and soul":

It is rapid, passionate; a quick arc of sounds and meaning done in a language which does not usually bend to speed. Its edges are burned by vision rather than explanation.

The literary scholar Jane Stevenson conjectured that this "highly original poem" was written by a Catholic nun.

== The text ==
The poem was rediscovered in 1960 by the medieval-lyric specialist Peter Dronke in a Bodleian manuscript dating ca. 1000 and copied at the monastery of Fleury on the river Loire. Dronke published the history of the text, critical apparatus, and commentary in Medieval Latin and the Rise of European Love-Lyric (Oxford 1968, 2nd ed.), vol. 2, pp. 332–341. He has remarked that "the excitement of those moments of first finding and reading it, and realizing what it was, remains vivid in the memory even after sixteen years."

== The poem ==
The unnamed female speaker recalls a night in April when her lover, Phoebus, visited her and then departs mysteriously. In a prose approximation:

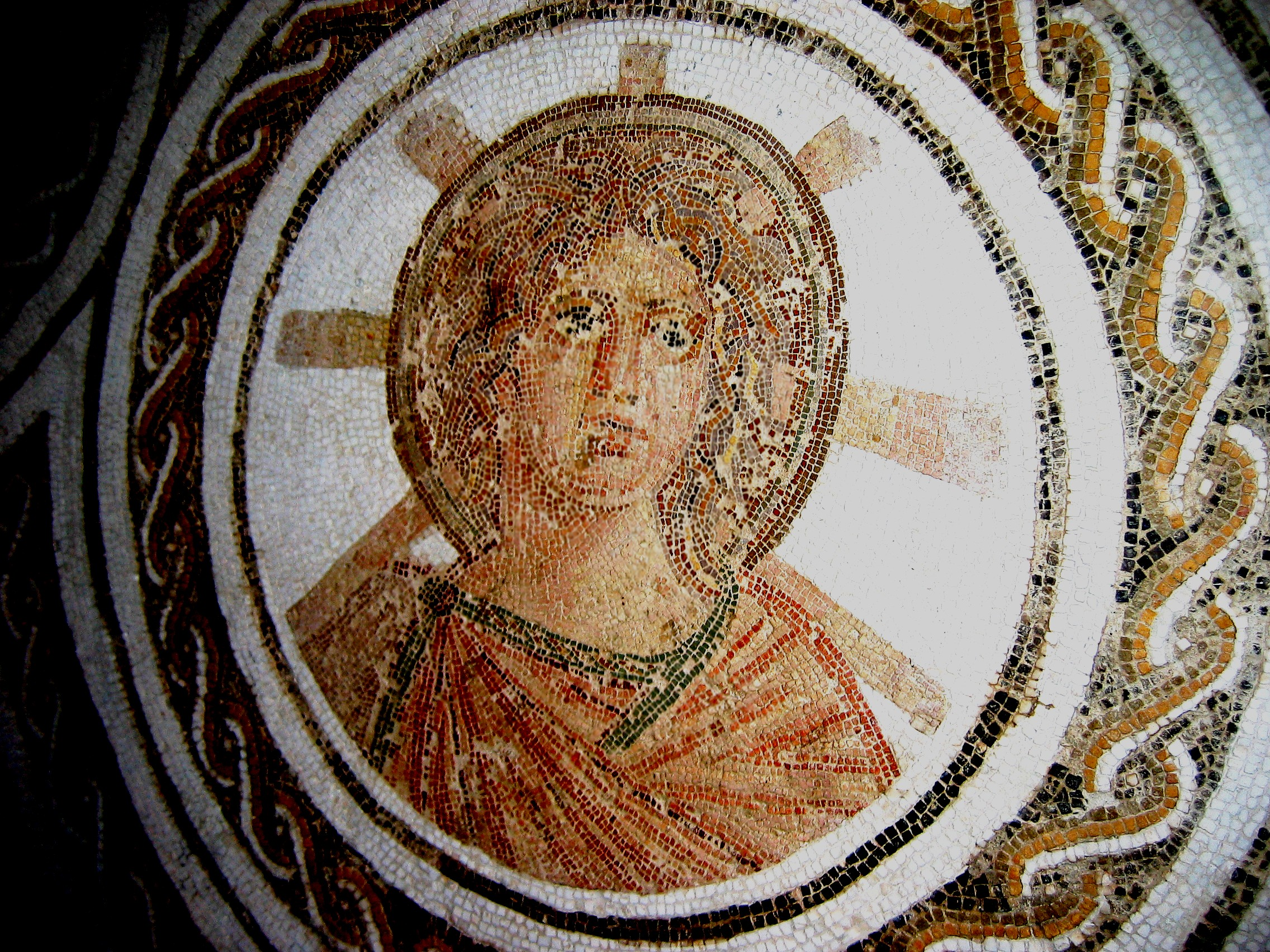
Apollo with radiant halo on a late 2nd-century mosaic

Phoebus had gone away, retracing his tracks. His sister was riding high, giving free rein to her course, directing her beams into woodland springs, and wild beasts at the chase for the sake of their own gullets. Mortals had surrendered their bodies to slumbers. At a time in April just passed, a faithful likeness stood before me; calling me sweetly, he touched me little by little. His voice, overwhelmed by tears, failed him. Sighing, he was not even strong enough to speak. I trembled within at the touch of this man; I leapt to rise as if startled. I opened my arms and arched my body; every part of me tensed, my blood drained to my innermost core. But he vanished; I held on to nothing. Freed from slumber, I boldly cried out: 'What escape do you seek? I beg of you, why so quickly? Don't take another step; if you want, I'll come too, for I want to live with you eternally!' I was embarrassed at once for having spoken in such a way. The terrace windows had been opened, Diana's beams poured in with beautiful light. Oh I – I'm miserable! I hurt for so long, my cheeks flooded with streams from crying until it was tomorrow: I never held back.

If the poem dramatizes a particular story, its source is unknown. In classical mythology, Phoebus can be another name for Apollo, god of music, healing, prophecy, and other forms of enlightenment who eventually shared Helios's role as embodiment of the Sun.

=== The form ===
The poem, in monorhyme, is structured in five strophes of five lines each in a meter adapted from the classical asclepiad. In form, Foebus abierat also resembles 8th–9th-century Latin poems in simple rhymed strophes and draws on the vernacular ballad tradition.

== Sources and influences ==
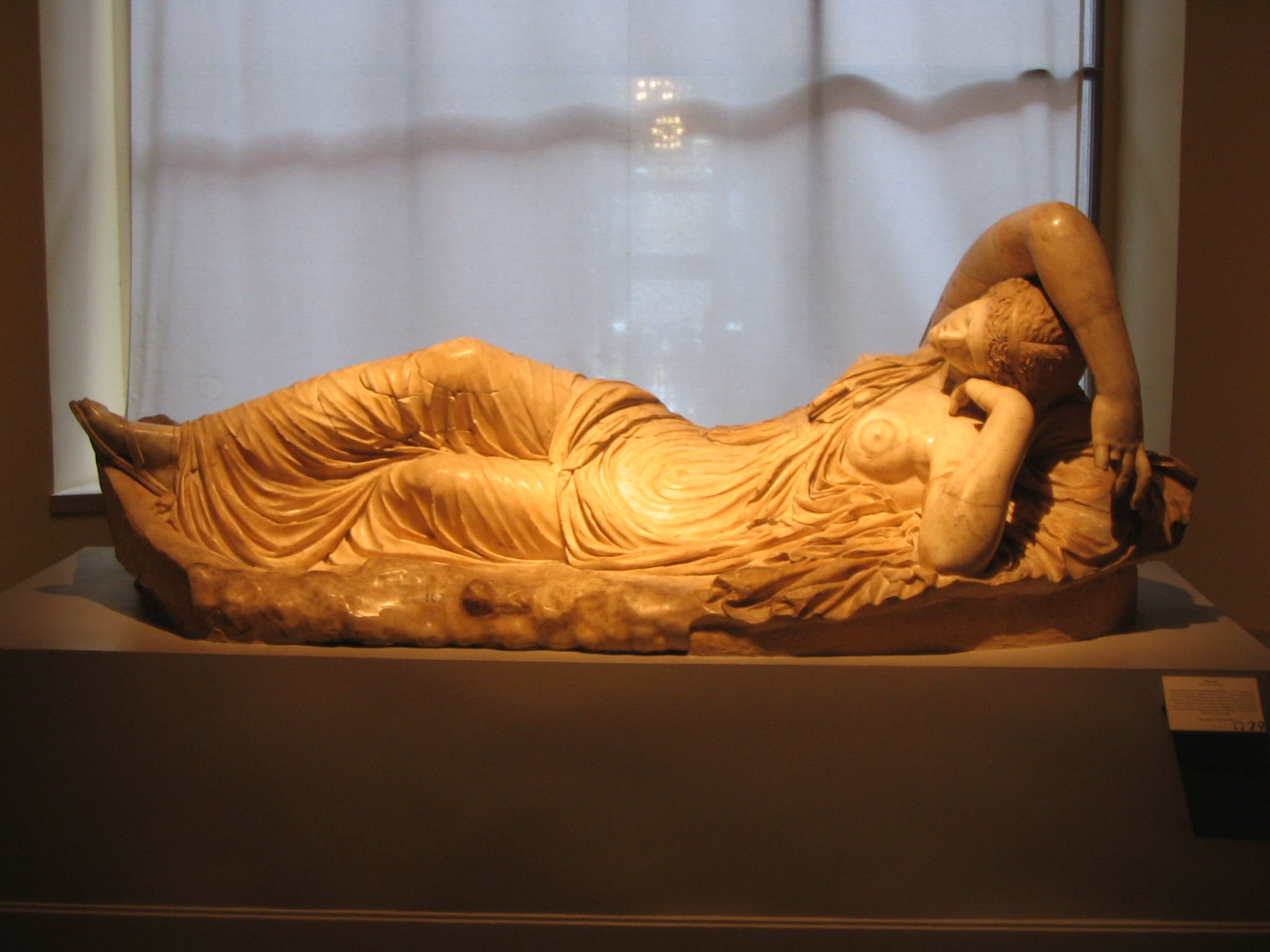
Ariadne Sleeping (Roman marble, 2nd century)

As Boland remarks on the relation of classical to medieval Latin in the poem, "The old language is present, but a skin of liturgy and sorcery has been laid over it."

=== Classical elements ===
Foebus abierat echoes the poetry of Ovid in both language and situation, most strongly the Heroides — particularly Epistula 13 in which Laodamia addresses her bridegroom Protesilaos, who has just sailed for Troy; and Epistula 10, in which Ariadne awakes to find herself abandoned by Theseus — and the Ceyx and Alcyone episode of Metamorphoses 11.

=== Christian allegory ===
Although the poem makes no specific references to Christ or Christian mysticism, it has nevertheless been read, as is often the case with erotic poetry of the Middle Ages, in light of the Song of Songs as an allegory of the Bride. Dronke, who believes the author of Foebus abierat was a man, suggests that the dreamlike erotic moment that ends with the lover disappearing and his bride in desolation has its origin in the Song of Songs, as does the enigma of whether the lover was even real.

=== The ballad tradition ===
A theme of medieval ballads is the visitation of a woman by her lover's ghost, which then disappears with the cock's crow, that is, at dawn — a motif also of the alba.

== Musical versions ==
The early music ensemble Sequentia performs and has recorded a setting of Foebus abierat as part of its "Lost Songs of a Rhineland Harper" program.

== Selected bibliography ==
- Boland, Eavan. Translator's note to "Phoebus was gone, all gone, his journey over." Poetry, April 2008, p. 37 online; text of translation.
- Dronke, Peter. "Learned Lyric and Popular Ballad in the Early Middle Ages." In The Medieval Poet and His World. Storia e letteratura raccolta di studi e test 164. Rome 1984, pp. 167ff. with Latin text online.
- Dronke, Peter. Sources of Inspiration: Studies in Literary Transformations, 400–1500. Storia e letterature raccolta di studi e testi 196. Rome 1997. Limited preview online.
- Stevenson, Jane. Women Latin Poets. Oxford University Press, 2005, p. 116 online.
