= Charlotte Piho =

New Zealand photographer and tourism operator

- Born: 1984/1984; New Zealand

Charlotte Piho (born 1984 or 1985) is a photographer and tourism operator in the Cook Islands.

Piho was born in New Zealand and is of Aitutakian, Rakahangan and Tahitian (Island of Moorea) descent. She was educated at Epsom Girls' Grammar School, before studying law and finance at the University of Auckland. After working in Sydney in finance and fashion she had a burst appendix, and later became a standup paddleboarder and yoga instructor.

In 2016 she represented the Cook Islands at the 2016 ISA World SUP and Paddleboard Championship in Fiji.

In 2018 Piho returned to Rarotonga and opened a diving business. She began working as an underwater photographer at the same time. In 2021 she won the New York Photography Award, and her photograph "Bubbles" won bronze in the 2023 Paris Photographer of the Year Award in the "nature" category, and gold in the European Photography Awards. In February 2022 she opened a gallery in Muri. In 2024 she won gold and the nature/underwater category in the TIFA Tokyo International Foto Awards.

On Oct 27 2023 Charlotte Piho Won the Wildlife (Electric Kiwi Wildlife award) and Peoples Choice Awards (Ockham Residential People’s Choice award) in the NZ Photographer of the Year Awards. This was from over 8000 entries and 25,000 votes. And is regarded as NZ’s most prestigious and celebrated photography awards.

In early 2024 Piho has been one of twelve selected around the world to exhibit her work at the Xposure International Film and Photography Festival in Dubai. Piho will be the only female representing Oceania. At the festival she will be awarded for her contribution to the world of photography.
