= 1980 New Year Honours (New Zealand) =

Annual awards for New Zealanders

The 1980 New Year Honours in New Zealand were appointments by Elizabeth II on the advice of the New Zealand government to various orders and honours to reward and highlight good works by New Zealanders. The awards celebrated the passing of 1979 and the beginning of 1980, and were announced on 31 December 1979.

The recipients of honours are displayed here as they were styled before their new honour.

== Knight Bachelor ==
- James Muir Cameron Fletcher – of Auckland. For services to industry and the community.
- Valdemar Reid Skellerup CBE – of Christchurch. For services to industry and the community.

== Order of the Bath ==
=== Companion (CB) ===
Military division

- Rear Admiral Neil Dudley Anderson CBE – Chief of Naval Staff.

== Order of Saint Michael and Saint George ==
=== Companion (CMG) ===
- William Milton Douglas Bremner – of Auckland. For public services and services to the textile industry.
- Raymond Douglas Jamieson – of Wellington, lately chief judge of the Arbitration Court.

== Order of the British Empire ==
=== Dame Commander (DBE) ===
Civil division

- Miriam Patricia Dell CBE JP – of Wellington; president of the International Council of Women. For services to women.
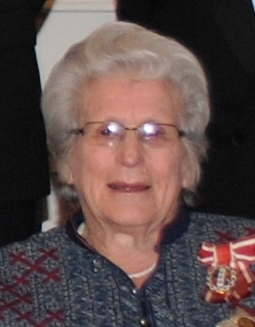
Dame Miriam Dell

=== Knight Commander (KBE) ===
Civil division

- Dr John Malfroy Staveley OBE MC – of Taupō. For services to New Zealand blood transfusion services.

=== Commander (CBE) ===
Civil division

- Philip William Blakeley – lately Deputy Secretary of Energy, Electricity Division, Ministry of Energy (general manager, New Zealand Electricity Department 1972–78).
- Ronald Victor Giorgi OBE JP – of Hastings. For services to the community.
- Sydney James Guppy MBE JP – of Nelson. For services to sport.
- The Honourable Eric Henry Halstead ED – lately New Zealand ambassador to Italy.
- Thomas Michael Hunt – of Wellington; lately Commissioner of Inland Revenue.
- Phillip Keith McCliskie MC – of Nelson. For services to the fruitgrowing industry.
- Bruce Edward George Mason – of Wellington. For services to literature and the arts.
- John Sutherland – of Wellington. For services to the community.

Military division

- Brigadier John Lindsay Smith MBE – Brigadiers' List, New Zealand Army.

=== Officer (OBE) ===
Civil division

- Frederick Joseph Burnard Beattie JP – of Wairoa. For services to the community.
- Keith Spencer Calder JP – of Rotorua. For services to local affairs.
- Alford Dornan – of Wellington. For services to the Boys' Brigade.
- Dr Lloyd Allister Drake – of Papatoetoe. For services to sports medicine.
- Minnie Maria Dronke – of Lower Hutt. For services to the performing arts.
- Robert Duthie – of Auckland. For services to the library profession.
- William Douglas Goodfellow – of Auckland. For services to the community.
- Henry James Hopkins DFC – of Christchurch; lately professor and head of the Department of Civil Engineering, University of Canterbury.
- Constance Violet Kirkcaldie – of Wellington. For services to the arts and community.
- William Donald McKenzie – of Invercargill. For services to the farming industry.
- Dr Stanley William Paterson Mirams – of Wellington, lately director of Mental Health Division, Department of Health.
- Mona Joy Reid – of Invercargill. For services to the Royal New Zealand Society for the Health of Women and Children (Plunket).
- Angus Ross MC ED – of Dunedin. For services to historical research and education.
- Douglas Marshall Shirley JP. For services to the city of Dunedin.
- Leo John Sullivan JP – of Orewa. For services to local government.
- Russell William Thomas – of Christchurch. For services to sport and community.
- Edwyn Peter Wilding – of Ohai. For services to local and community affairs.
- Edna May Wills – of Hāwera. For services to sport and the community.

Military division

- Commander Iain Malcolm McGibbon – Royal New Zealand Navy.
- Brigadier Alfred Connel Hamilton – Brigadiers' List, New Zealand Army.
- Group Captain John Jeremy Gordon – Royal New Zealand Air Force.

=== Member (MBE) ===
Civil division

- Amy Mona Anderson – of Canterbury. For services to literature.
- Bruce Cooper Bell – of Auckland. For services to bridge.
- Ronald Graeme Dellow – of Auckland. For services to music.
- Isobel Cookson Miriam Doel – of Northland. For services to the community.
- Molly Ngaire Dorne – of Horowhenua. For services to sport.
- Mary Josephine Drayton – of Tauranga. For services to education and the community.
- Cyril Leonard Fitzgerald – of Dunedin. For services to the community.
- Daisy Pearl Ann Griggs – of Palmerston North. For services to bowling.
- Pirihana Te Tama Ihurangi Kotua – of Nelson. For services to Māori people.
- Hugh Thomas Augustus McGahan – of Matamata. For services to local affairs.
- Ashley George McHugh – of Gisborne. For services to sport and community.
- Joseph Alexander Maich ED – of Manurewa. For services to education and community.
- Lorimer Jean Marshall – of Ashburton. For services to speech and drama teaching.
- William Robert Francis Naylor – of Oamaru. For services to community.
- Dulcie Ruth Newman – of Christchurch; lately chief nursing officer, North Canterbury Hospital Board.
- Eunice Constance Patterson – of Whangārei. For services to community.
- Rebecca Vivian Mary Perrott – of Wellington. For services to swimming.
- Alfred Andrew Henry Pinkerton – of South Canterbury. For services to the community.
- Hilda Catherine Ramsay – of Auckland. For services to the intellectually handicapped.
- Trevor James Smith – of Cromwell. For services to aviation.
- Rehutai Florence Somerville – of Maramarua. For services to the community.
- Frank William Terry – of Blenheim. For services to opera.
- Harold Wilson Upton – of Ngāruawāhia. For services to the wool industry.
- Dr Robert Tannahill Watson – of Inglewood. For services to the community.
- Noel Maud Wells – of North Canterbury. For services to Women's Division of Federated Farmers.

Military division

- Lieutenant Commander Charles Thomas Money Raven – Royal New Zealand Navy.
- Major John Brunswick Bell – Royal New Zealand Engineers (Territorial Force).
- Major Derek Graye Shattky – Royal New Zealand Infantry Regiment.
- Warrant Officer Class I Raymond Owen Wills – Royal New Zealand Engineers.
- Squadron Leader Graeme Yuill Gemmell – Royal New Zealand Air Force.
- Squadron Leader Ronald Bruce Wooller – Royal New Zealand Air Force.

== British Empire Medal (BEM) ==
Military division

- Leading Signalman Sidney Christopher Milner – Royal New Zealand Navy.
- Master at Arms Donald Neilson Shepherd – Royal New Zealand Navy.
- Petty Officer Seaman Raymond Victor Williams – Royal New Zealand Naval Volunteer Reserve.
- Corporal Garry Edward Cantwell – Royal New Zealand Army Medical Corps.
- Sergeant John Alfred Elliot – Royal New Zealand Infantry Regiment.
- Staff Sergeant Alan John Oliver – Royal New Zealand Engineers (Territorial Force).
- Staff Sergeant Phee Wanoa – New Zealand Special Air Service.
- Flight Sergeant John Raymond Hibbard – Royal New Zealand Air Force.
- Flight Sergeant Nowell Bruce Mant-Old – Royal New Zealand Air Force.
- Sergeant Paul Schwabe – Royal New Zealand Air Force.

== Companion of the Queen's Service Order (QSO) ==
=== For community service ===
- Cyril Robertson Bradwell JP – of Wellington.
- Joan Pomeroy Dunne (The Reverend Mother Mary Philippine) – of Wellington.
- Edward Alexander McKay – of Ngāruawāhia.
- Hubert Edgar Millar – of Auckland.
- Mabel Lillian Ross – of Invercargill.

=== For public services ===
- Peter Stanhope Beath JP – of Dunedin.
- Alan Trevor Bell JP – of Auckland.
- James Bruce Crompton – of Northland.
- Ian Douglas Dick – of Tawa; lately Deputy Secretary of Energy (Planning), Ministry of Energy (Secretary of Mines, Mines Department 1967–78).
- Michael Ernest Groome – of Hastings.
- Reginald Alfred Keeling – of Auckland.
- Dr Harry Tawn Nemaia JP – Director of Health, Niue.
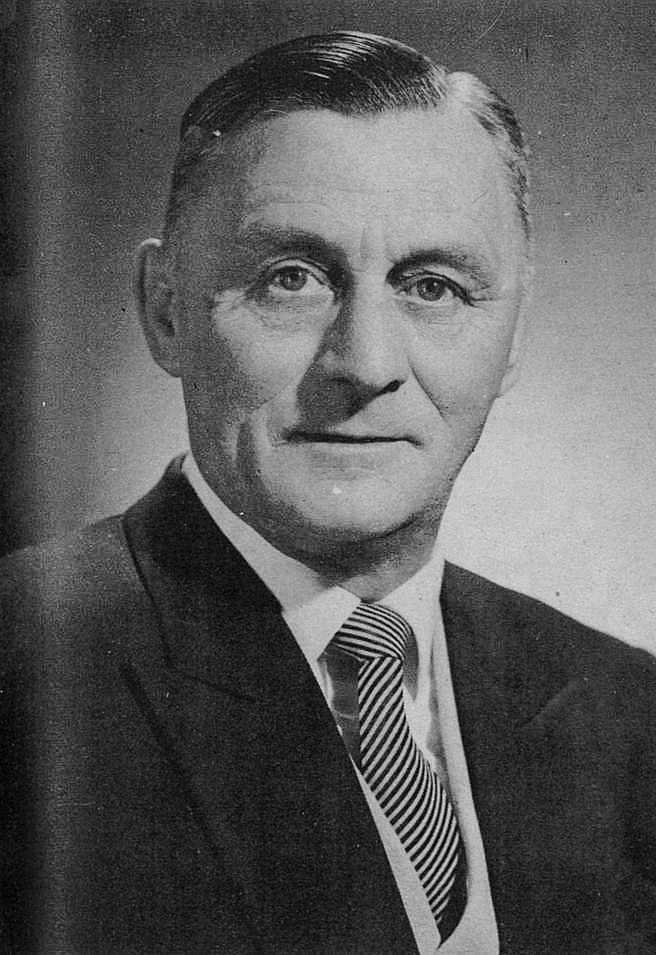
Reginald Keeling

== Queen's Service Medal (QSM) ==
=== For community service ===
- Gladys Annie Armstrong – of Hāwera.
- Maxwell Stewart Bartholomew JP – of Levin.
- Edith Annie Brennan – of Auckland.
- Violet Ada Briffault – of Whakatāne.
- Reta Elizabeth Chapman – of Martinborough.
- Alexander Edward Hope Clow – of Auckland.
- Molly Davis Cook – of Wellington.
- Violet May Cruden – of Ōpunake.
- June Catherine Davey – of Timaru.
- Bertha Lillian Gates – of Northland.
- Myrtle Muriel Godfery – of Auckland.
- Mary Anne Gough – of Henderson.
- Pauline Dawn Grainger – of Te Kūiti.
- Leo Damien Greenwood – of Wellington.
- Francis Hardman – of Palmerston North.
- Rewa Mary Henderson – of Auckland.
- Florence Myrtle Keene – of Whangārei.
- Muriel Joan Leggatt – of Matamata.
- Roseanna Gillespie Mardon – of Napier.
- Bronislaw Nawrocki – of Lower Hutt.
- Gladys Ngaere Phillips – of Ōtorohanga.
- Janet Annabelle Prescott JP – of Ōtorohanga.
- Hilary Fay Reid – of Auckland.
- The Reverend Roger Frederick Norton Thompson – of Christchurch.
- Edith Kathleen Werry – of Waipukurau.
- Ray Evelyn Lilian Whale JP – of Auckland.

=== For public services ===
- Enid Laura Annan – of Clyde.
- Constance Joyce Barns – of Wellington.
- Eric George Boggs – of Auckland.
- Russell Mclndoe Chant – constable, New Zealand Police.
- Heapera Matekino Collier – of Tokomaru Bay.
- Walter Graham Douglas – sergeant, New Zealand Police.
- Douglas George Francis – of Lower Hutt; lately Director (Mapping), Department of Lands and Survey.
- Herbert Angus Graham – head chauffeur, Public Service Garage, New Zealand Post Office (Auckland).
- Betty Ileene Holmes – secretary–typist, Ministry of Civil Defence, Palmerston North.
- Ronald James Iremonger – of Raumati Beach; lately head chauffeur, Public Service Garage, New Zealand Post Office (Wellington).
- Ann Kerse – of Dunedin; lately chief nursing officer, Southland Hospital Board.
- Clement Leicester Steele Paterson – of Christchurch.
- Lesley Richard Payne – of Paraparaumu; gardener, Government House, Wellington, 1936–79.
- James Thomas Francis Rowe – of Kaitangata.
- Gerald Sanders Tamati – constable, New Zealand Police.
- Joseph William Henry Trickey – of South Auckland.
- Dr Ying Kay Tseung – of Auckland.
- Albert Burnie Towle White – senior inspector (engineering), HM New Zealand Dockyard, Auckland.
- Thomas Harold Edward Wilton – of Northland.

== Queen's Fire Service Medal (QFSM) ==
- James Edward Carn-Bennett – chief fire officer, Silverdale Volunteer Fire Brigade.
- Donald Leslie Hallett – chief fire officer, Te Awamutu Volunteer Fire Brigade.
- William James Henderson OBE – fire commissioner, New Zealand Fire Service Commission.

== Queen's Police Medal ==
- Peter Ian Jenkinson – inspector, New Zealand Police.

== Royal Red Cross ==
=== Associate (ARRC) ===
- Major Jessie Eveline Grant – Royal New Zealand Nursing Corps.

== Air Force Cross (AFC) ==
- Flight Lieutenant Gary Alexander Wrathall – Royal New Zealand Air Force.
