= Florence Keene =

NZ politician, writer, feminist, historian, and women's health campaigner

Florence Myrtle Keene
- Born: 3 May 1908; Kaitaia, Northland, New Zealand
- Died: 15 February 1998 (aged 89)
- Occupations: historian, teacher, author

Florence Myrtle Matthews Keene QSM (née Matthews 3 May 1908 – 15 February 1998) was a New Zealand historian, teacher and author who contributed significantly to the recorded history of the Northland Region.

== Early life and family ==
Keene was born in Kaitaia, Northland, on 3 May 1908, the daughter of Herbert Bismark Matthews and Eliza Myrtle Matthews. She is a descendant of Reverends Joseph Matthews and Richard Davis, both of the Church Missionary Society; the former had worked in New Zealand since 1832 while the latter was based at the Te Waimate Mission. Keene was educated at Kaitaia Primary School and Epsom Girls' Grammar School. After attending Auckland Teachers' Training College and the University of Auckland, she taught throughout Northland. Her first teaching post was at Kaeo, where she taught 56 students.

In 1936 she married John Oswald Keene at St Saviour's Anglican Church, Kaitaia. The couple would have four children.

She was a member of the New Zealand Women's Writers, Whangarei Historical Society, the Historic Places Trust, and was on the executive committee of the Northland Regional Museum.

Keene died on 15 February 1998, aged 89. Her husband had predeceased her several years previously.

== Writing career ==
Keene wrote and published over 20 books relating to Northland history, people and places. She was also the secretary of Northland, the regional magazine. A collection of Keene's papers and photographs is held by the Whangarei District Libraries. During her career she made a significant contribution to the recorded history of Northland.

== Honours ==
Keene received the Queen's Service Medal for community service in the 1980 New Year Honour.

== Selected bibliography ==
- Cross over Kauri (1960)
- O Te Raki (1963)
- Between Two Mountains (1966)
- With Flags Flying (1973)
- By This We Conquer (1974)
- Rangatira from Aupori (1974)
- Tai Tokerau (1975)
- Milestone: Whangarei County's first 100 years, 1876-1976 (1976)
- To the Northward (1977)
- Legacies in Kauri: old homes & churches of the North (1978)
- Mimiwhangata Station (1978)
- Poroti: marking the centennial of the Poroti School, 1879-1979 (1979)
- Myrtle and Sophia (1982)
- Time Turns the Pages (1983)
- Under Northland Skies: forty women of Northland (1984)
- Women: Today & Yesterday (1987)
- No turning back (1989)
- Northland founders (1989)
- Kaitaia and its people (1989)
- ... And his wife : women of Whangarei (1991)
- From past to present : Waimamaku and Poroti (1992)
- Down the O'Donnell, Davis, Matthews ladder (1995)
