= Jude Dobson =

New Zealand TV presenter, producer and author

Jude Dobson ONZM
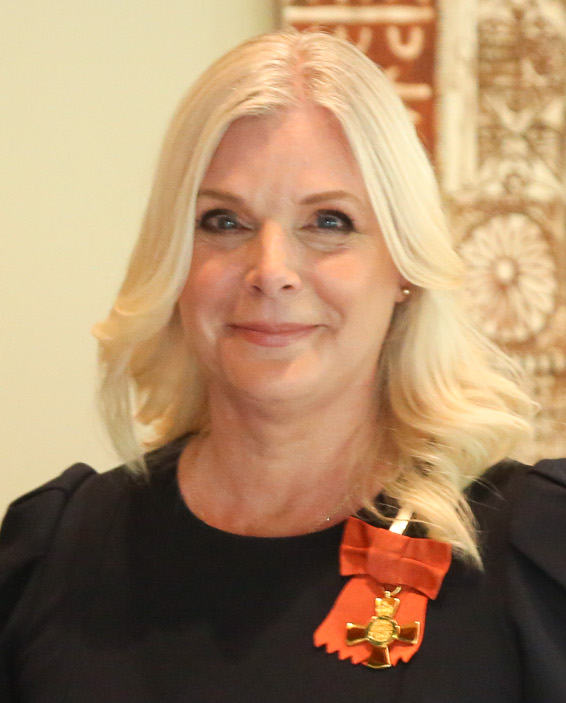
- Dobson in 2025
- Born: Judith Mary Kirk; 1966 or 1967 (age 58–59); Auckland, New Zealand
- Occupation: TV presenter, producer and author
- Spouse: Graeme Dobson

Judith Mary Dobson ONZM (née Kirk; born 1966 or 1967) is a New Zealand TV presenter, producer and author. Dobson co-authored The Last Secret Agent: The untold story of my life as a spy behind Nazi enemy lines with Pippa Latour, who shares her story as a World War II spy.

== Early life and career ==
Dobson was born Judith Mary Kirk in Auckland in about 1966 and grew up in the suburb of Māngere Bridge. She was educated at Epsom Girls' Grammar School, before training as a nurse and working at National Women's Hospital and Green Lane Hospital. In 1987, she began part-time modelling, and made her first television appearance that year as a contestant on the show Face of the Eighties. The following year, she spent two months modelling in Japan, and worked as pharmaceutical sales representative on her return to New Zealand. She competed in the 1988 Miss Universe New Zealand pageant, placing fourth, behind winner Lana Coc-Kroft, and that year was a model in the Benson and Hedges Fashion Awards and appeared on the children's programme Spot On in an item about a day in the life of a fashion model.

== Honours and awards ==
In the 2025 King’s Birthday Honours, Dobson was appointed an Officer of the New Zealand Order of Merit, for services to the community, broadcasting and historical preservation.

== Personal life ==
Dobson is married to Graeme Dobson, a former Royal New Zealand Air Force pilot.
