= Louise Nicholson (academic) =

New Zealand neuroscientist

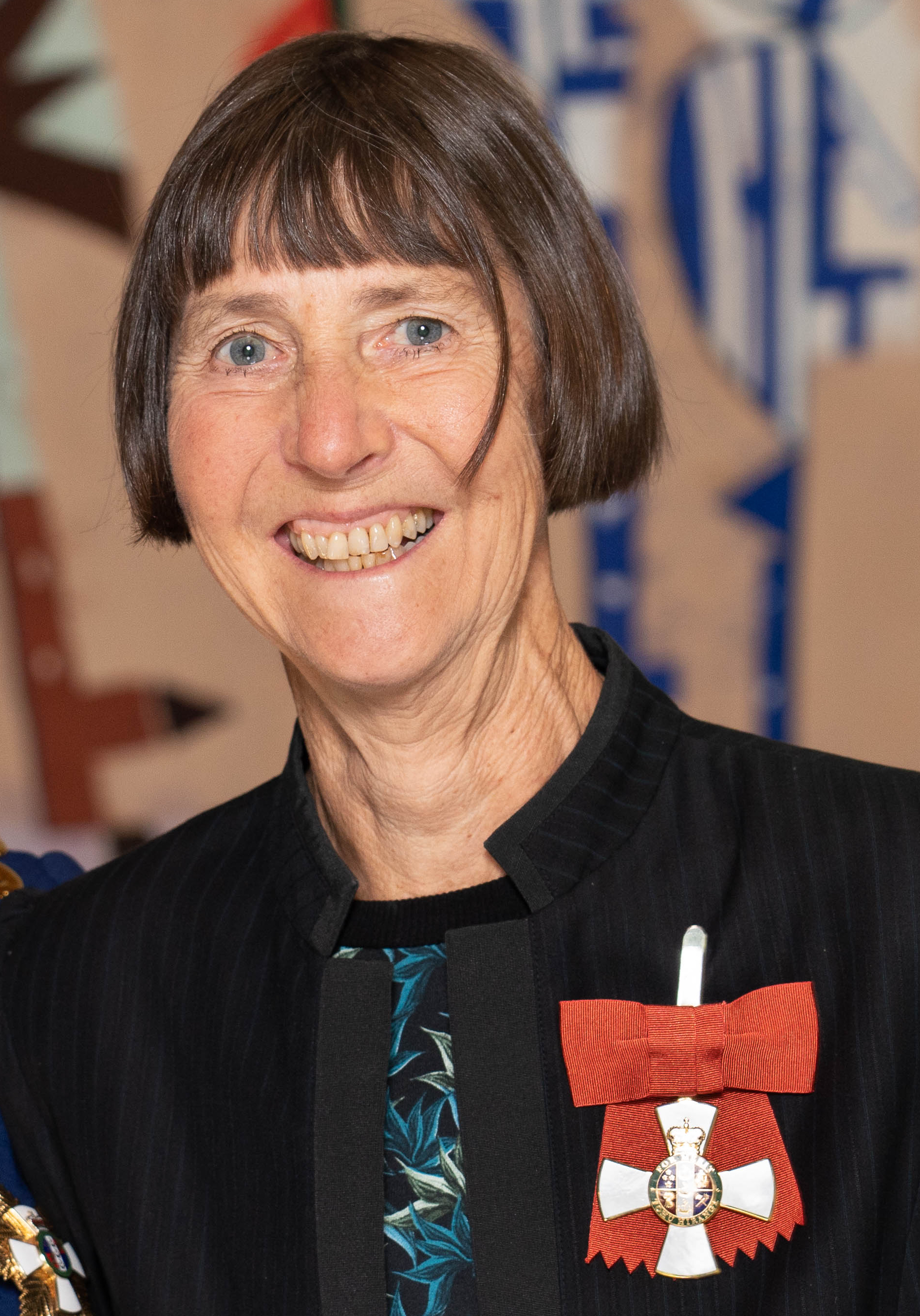
- Awards: Companion of the New Zealand Order of Merit, Rhodes Visiting Fellowship

Academic background
- Education: University of Auckland, University of Auckland, Epsom Girls' Grammar School
- Theses: The structure and function of the hind-gut of the nymph of the dragonfly, Uropetala carovei (White) (1974); Structure and function of the Malpighian tubules of the larva of the New Zealand glow-worm Arachnocampa luminosa (Skuse) (1978)
- Doctoral advisor: Patricia Bergquist, John Sidney Bullivant

Louise Frances Basford Nicholson CNZM (nee Green) is a New Zealand neuroscientist, and is professor emerita at the University of Auckland, specialising in molecular mechanisms common to neurodegenerative diseases. In 2021, Nicholson was appointed a Companion of the New Zealand Order of Merit for services to neuroscience and education.

== Academic career ==
Nicholson attended Epsom Girls Grammar School. She completed a Masters and then a PhD titled Structure and function of the Malpighian tubules of the larva of the New Zealand glow-worm Arachnocampa luminosa (Skuse) at the University of Auckland. Nicholson spent two and half years as a visiting fellow at Lady Margaret Hall in Oxford, and then returned to New Zealand, where she taught science at Mahurangi College from 1981 to 1988. Nicholson then joined the faculty of the Department of Anatomy with Radiology at the University of Auckland, initially as a senior lecturer. She was Head of Biology for Medicine in 1989. Nicholson worked on neurodegenerative diseases such as motor neuron disease, Huntington's, Parkinson's and Alzheimer's diseases. She was appointed full professor in 2009, and worked at the university for nearly 30 years, during which she spent a year at the Salk Institute.

With Simon O'Carroll and Colin Green, Nicholson founded the Spinal Cord Research Facility within the university's Centre for Brain Research. The facility is funded by the CatWalk Spinal Cord Injury Research Trust.

In 2014, after years of severe headaches, Nicholson was diagnosed with a brain tumour, leading her to retire from research. On her retirement, she was appointed professor emerita, and she and her husband gifted $1 million towards spinal injury research.

== Honours and awards ==
Nicholson was awarded a Rhodes Scholarship in 1978 to attend Lady Margaret Hall as a Visiting Fellow for two years. Only 32 Rhodes Visiting Fellowships were awarded.

In the New Years Honours for 2021, Nicholson was appointed a Companion of the New Zealand Order of Merit for services to neuroscience and education.

== Selected works ==
- Danesh, Helen Victoria; Kerr, Nathan; Jie Zhang; Elizabeth K Eady; O'Carroll, Simon Joseph; Nicholson, Louise Frances Basford; Johnson, Cameron; Green, Colin (2012). "Connexin43 mimetic peptide reduces vascular leak and retinal ganglion cell death following retinal ischaemia". Brain. 135 (Pt 2): 506–520. doi:10.1093/brain/awr338. PMID 22345088. Wikidata Q48654177.
- Carissa G Fonseca; Green, Colin; Nicholson, Louise Frances Basford (2002). "Upregulation in astrocytic connexin 43 gap junction levels may exacerbate generalized seizures in mesial temporal lobe epilepsy". Brain Research. 929 (1): 105–116. doi:10.1016/s0006-8993(01)03289-9. PMID 11852037. Wikidata Q31039156.
- Davidson, Joanne; Green, Colin; Nicholson, Louise Frances Basford; O'Carroll, Simon Joseph; Mhoyra Fraser; Bennet, Laura; Gunn, Alistair Jan (2012). "Connexin hemichannel blockade improves outcomes in a model of fetal ischemia". Annals of Neurology. 71 (1): 121–132. doi:10.1002/ana.22654. PMID 22275258. Wikidata Q42633519.
- O'Carroll, Simon Joseph; Mamoun Alkadhi; Nicholson, Louise Frances Basford; Green, Colin (2008). "Connexin 43 mimetic peptides reduce swelling, astrogliosis, and neuronal cell death after spinal cord injury". Cell Communication & Adhesion. 15 (1): 27–42. doi:10.1080/15419060802014164. PMID 18649176. Wikidata Q46467494.
- Lian Wu; Li Ma; Nicholson, Louise Frances Basford; Peter N Black (2010). "Advanced glycation end products and its receptor (RAGE) are increased in patients with COPD". Respiratory Medicine. 105 (3): 329–336. doi:10.1016/j.rmed.2010.11.001. PMID 21112201. Wikidata Q34152095.
- Nicholson, Louise Frances Basford; Gunisha K Singh; Thomas Osterwalder; Roman, Gregg; Davis, Ronald; Haig Keshishian (2008). "Spatial and temporal control of gene expression in Drosophila using the inducible GeneSwitch GAL4 system. I. Screen for larval nervous system drivers". Genetics. 178 (1): 215–234. doi:10.1534/genetics.107.081968. PMC 2206072. PMID 18202369. Wikidata Q36391801.
