= Karen Walker (designer) =

New Zealand fashion designer

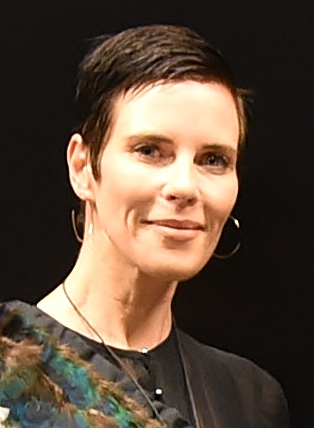
- Walker in 2017
- Born: December 1969 (age 56); New Zealand
- Education: Epsom Girls' Grammar School
- Labels: Living with Cannibals and Other Adventures, Dough and Dynamite, Liberal and Miserable, Karen in TV Land, Queenie Was a Dog, Victory Garden, Karen to the Rescue, Young, Willing and Eager

Karen Elizabeth Walker CNZM (born December 1969) is a noted New Zealand fashion designer.

== Private life ==
Walker was born in December 1969. She grew up in the Auckland suburb of Remuera and attended Epsom Girls' Grammar School. Aged 21, she married Mikhail Gherman.

== Career ==
Walker began her fashion label in 1987, and opened her first store in Newmarket, Auckland, in 1995. She began selling to Barneys New York in 1998, the same year she showed her first runway collection. In late 2011, she signed a partnership with U.S.A. retail chain Anthropologie.

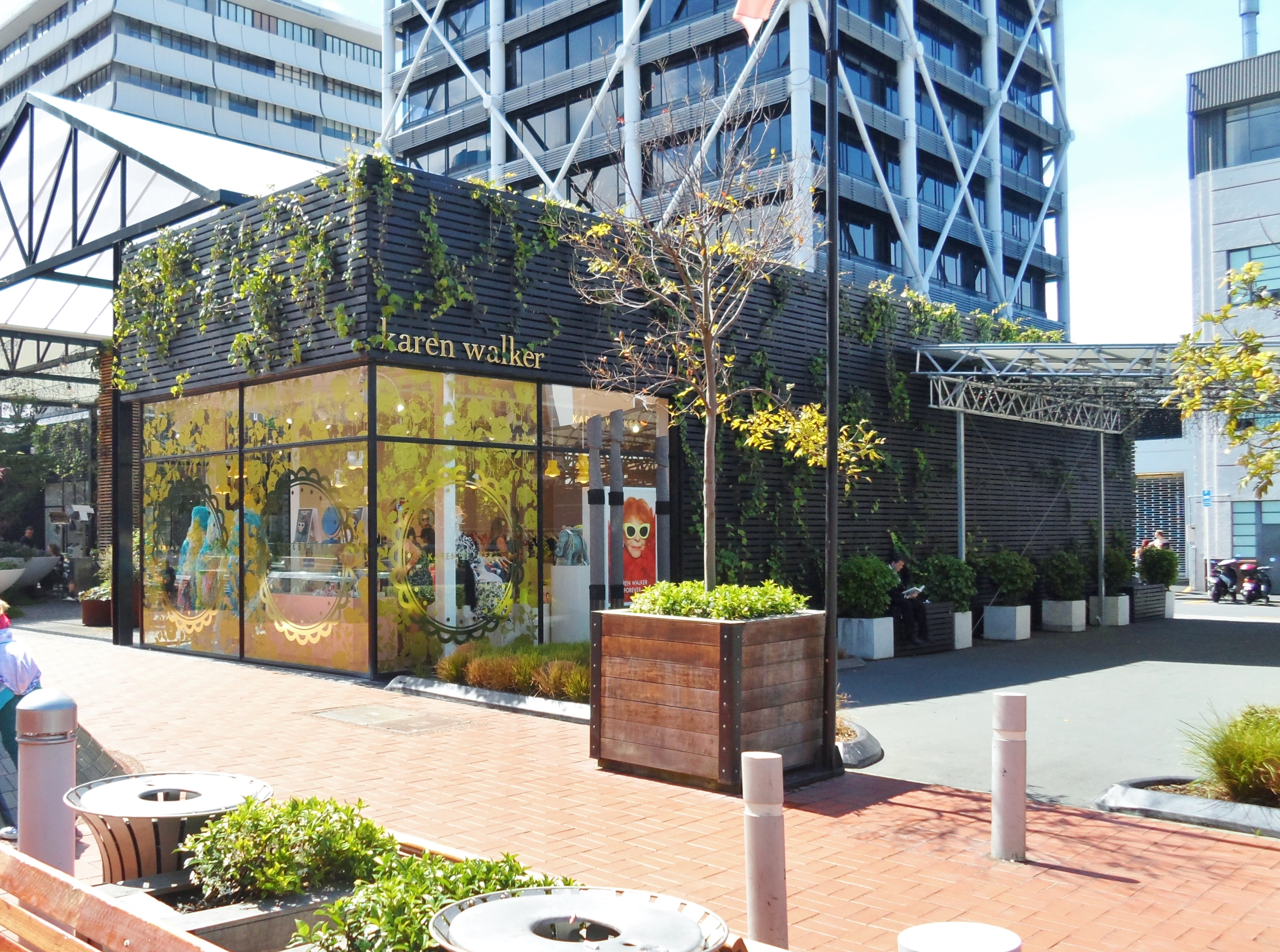
Karen Walker flagship Britomart store in the Auckland CBD

She has designed clothes worn by Björk, Sienna Miller, Natalie Portman, M.I.A., Alexa Chung, Beth Ditto, Michael Haneke, Liv Tyler, Rihanna, Claire Danes, Zooey Deschanel and Jennifer Lopez. She designed clothes worn by Kate Winslet in the Michel Gondry film Eternal Sunshine of the Spotless Mind.

In the 2004 New Year Honours, Walker was appointed a Member of the New Zealand Order of Merit, for services to the fashion industry. She was promoted to Companion of the New Zealand Order of Merit, for services to fashion design, in the 2014 New Year Honours. In 2009 Walker received a World Class New Zealand Award in the Creative category.

Walker is also an expert on colour for interiors and has partnered with Resene to produce her own line of paint colours.

Walker was appointed to the board of Creative New Zealand in December 2024.
