= Mona Anderson =

New Zealand writer, rural memoirist

Mona Anderson MBE
- Mona Anderson at a signing for Both Sides of the River in 1981
- Born: Amy Mona Holland / Tarling; 11 March 1909 New Brighton, New Zealand
- Died: 3 May 2004 (aged 95) Kaikohe, New Zealand
- Notable works: A River Rules My Life

Amy Mona Anderson MBE (nḗe Holland; 11 March 1909 – 3 May 2004) was a New Zealand writer. She is best known for her first book, A River Rules My Life, published in 1963. In Pacific Affairs in 1963–64, American J. B. Condliffe described it as "an immediate best-seller in New Zealand", while in 2017 a Christchurch City librarian wrote that its reissue was "a cornerstone of New Zealand back country life".

Anderson was appointed a Member of the Order of the British Empire in the 1980 New Year Honours, for services to literature.

== Early life ==
Anderson was born Amy Mona Holland in New Brighton, Christchurch, New Zealand on the 11 March 1909. She was often known by her father's last name, Tarling, instead of her mother's. Her mother was Alice Maud Holland and her father, William Tarling, worked as a potter. She attended South Malvern Primary School and received her secondary education through private tutoring. She displayed a strong interest in writing from a young age.

In May 1927, eighteen-year-old Mona Tarling married Leslie William Tipler. Tipler worked as a motor mechanic. They settled in Oxford, North Canterbury, and divorced in November 1936.

== Career ==
After working as a housemaid from 1935, Mona married Ronald Edward Anderson and moved to Mount Algidus Station, a 40,000-hectare (100,000-acre) sheep station near Lake Coleridge. Mona Anderson wrote a series of magazine articles on life at Mount Algidus, which led to her delivering scripted talks on the Christchurch radio station 3YA for six years.

Anderson's first book, A River Rules My Life, sold out of its first print run within three days of its 1963 publication. Her publisher had suggested she name it "High Country Wife", a title which she rejected. Her next books, The Good Logs of Algidus (1965) and Over the River (1966) followed shortly after. By the mid-60s, Anderson was a best-selling author.

Anderson's successful writing career spanned until the eighties. In the 1980 New Year Honours, she was appointed a Member of the Order of the British Empire, for services to literature. Her final book, Both Sides of the River, came out the following year. She then retired, focusing on nursing her unwell husband, Ronald, and brother, Mick, both of whom died in 1992. Anderson's final public appearance was at a library in 2001. She died on the 3 May 2004 in her Kaikohe cottage, aged 95.

== Works ==
- A River Rules My Life (1963)
- The Good Logs of Algidus (1965)
- Over the River (1966)
- A Wonderful World At My Doorstep (1968)
- A Letter From James (1972)
- Mary-Lou: The story of a high country lamb (1975)
- The Water Joey (1976)
- Old Duke: The story of a hard-case horse (1977)
- Home Is the High Country: My animal friends (1979)
- Both Sides of the River (1981)
