= Dorothy Wills =

New Zealand architect

- Born: Dorothy Mary Wills; 27 March 1911
- Died: 11 July 2007 (aged 96)
- Occupation: Architect
- Years active: 1933–1969
- Known for: Second woman registered architect in New Zealand

Dorothy Mary Wills (27 March 1911 – 11 July 2007), also known as Dorothy Mary Coulthard, was a New Zealand architect, and the second woman to become a registered architect in New Zealand.

== Early life ==
Wills was born on 27 March 1911, the only child of George Herbert Alexander Wills and Mary Estelle Wills of Tauranga. Her father was actively involved in amateur theatre.

Wills was educated at Tauranga District High School, where she won a Junior National Scholarship in 1923. She went on to study for two years at Epsom Girls' Grammar School, and passed the matriculation examination in 1926. She also won a Senior National Scholarship.

During her early years in Tauranga, Wills was active in amateur dance and theatre performances.

== Career ==
Wills began her studies in architecture at the University of Auckland in 1929. By 1933 she had completed her examinations for Associate Membership of the New Zealand Institute of Architects. Two of her fifth-year university drawings were featured in the university's prospectus in 1935. In 1934, she was the second woman in New Zealand to graduate with a B.Arch, and in 1936 she became the second woman in New Zealand to become a Registered Architect (after Lucy Greenish who was registered 20 years earlier in 1914).

Wills began her career as an architect in Tauranga, and was employed by architect H. L. D. West between 1933 and 1936. During that time, West was the borough architect for the Tauranga Borough. In 1935, Wills gave an address about architecture during an educational course for girls, run by the Women's Institute. In 1936, Wills left Tauranga for London.

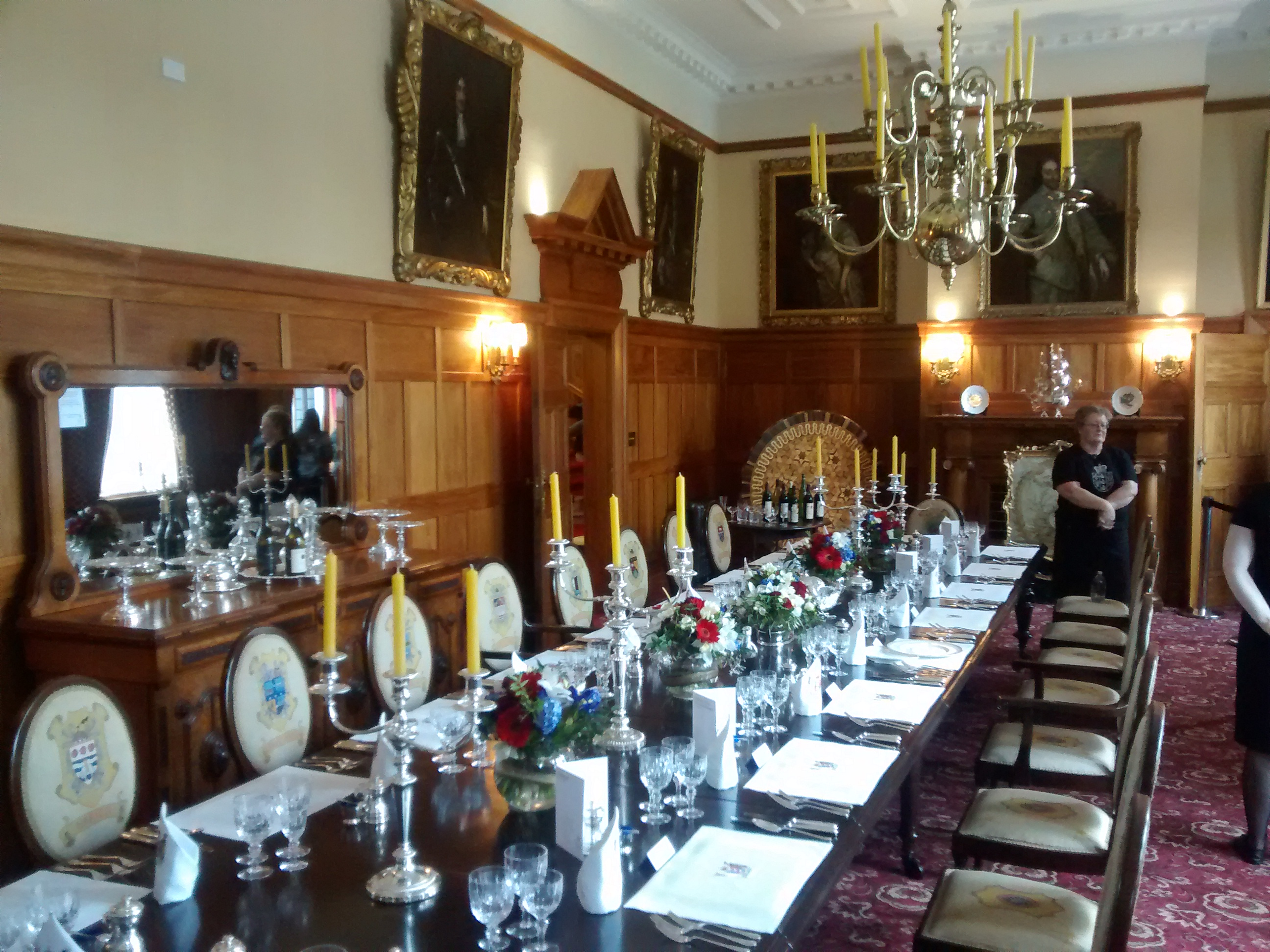
Chair tapestries on display at Government House, Wellington

During World War II, Wills utilised her architecture training in work for the British Intelligence Service, where she evaluated the use of stately homes in the English countryside to accommodate scientists and other personnel who were key to the war effort, in locations away from London. This included providing advice on the fitness for purpose of houses and reporting any alterations required. She is believed to have also carried out assessments for the Ministry of Works of bomb-damaged buildings. After the war ended, she remained in Britain, working on housing projects.

Wills returned to New Zealand in 1949, and was employed by the Housing Division of the Ministry of Works in Wellington. Her work included a range of hospital projects. In particular, she worked with Lady Freyberg, the governor general's wife, in the preparation of King George VI's visit to Government House. In total, there were thirty-eight tapestries that were commissioned as dining chairs, displaying coats of arms of cities and towns. These tapestries can still be found in Government House to this day, despite the cancellation of the King's trip. She was promoted to senior architect in 1957, and continued her employment with the Ministry of Works until around 1969.

After retirement, Wills undertook a renovation of a family home, and took part in restoring the St Mary's Church in Blenheim with architect Michael Fowler.

== Personal life ==
In the period 1929 to 1935, Wills continued to participate in amateur dance and theatre performances, and also had an active social life.

In 1935, Wills was an office-holder in the Tauranga branch of the League of Nations Union.

Between 1933 and 1936, Wills was involved in the Tauranga Beautifying Society.

In 1936, Wills left Tauranga for London. In 1937, she was presented at Buckingham Palace along with several other New Zealand women.

In 1949, Wills returned to New Zealand to take care of her father, and settled in Wellington.

In 1957, Wills married James Coulthard, but she continued her employment with the Ministry of Works. Although a senior architect, Wills was recorded in the census at the time as either 'spinster', 'housewife' or 'married'. The couple moved to Marlborough during the 1970s; her husband died in 1977. The couple did not have any children.

Wills lived in Blenheim from 1973 until her death on 11 July 2007, aged 96. Her memorial is located at Ōmaka Cemetery, Blenheim, New Zealand. In her will, she left a bequest for public art projects in Marlborough. The Dorothy Coulthard Arts Trust made a grant for a kinetic wind sculpture by New Zealand sculptor Grant Williams that was installed outside the ASB Theatre in Blenheim in 2014.
