= Annie Christina Morrison =

New Zealand headmistress

Annie Christina Morrison (27 February 1870 – 31 August 1953) was a New Zealand headmistress. She was born in Onehunga, Auckland, New Zealand on 27 February 1870. Her father was missionary Donald Morrison. Morrison was the first headmistress of Epsom Girls' Grammar School in Auckland.
