= Maria Dronke =

German actress, drama producer and teacher (1904–1987)

Minnie Maria Dronke OBE (née Kronfeld, 17 July 1904 – 28 August 1987) was a New Zealand actor, drama producer and teacher.

She was born Minnie Kronfeld in 1904 in Berlin, Germany, the daughter of Laura (Liebmann) and Salomon Kronfeld, a barrister. Born into a Jewish family, she converted to Catholicism in 1928 and took on the name Maria Magdalena. Her Jewish background placed her in great danger in Nazi Germany and in December 1938, she went to live at a Catholic convent at Fenham, England. She was eventually reunited with her husband, judge Adolf John Rudolf Dronke, and children there, and the Archbishop of Wellington, Thomas O'Shea, arranged for them to come to New Zealand, where they arrived in August 1939. Her son was scholar Peter Dronke. She is also related to Josh Kronfeld, a member of the All Blacks squad in the 1995 Rugby World Cup.

In the 1980 New Year Honours, Dronke was appointed an Officer of the Order of the British Empire, for services to the performing arts. She died in Lower Hutt on 28 August 1987.
