= Donald Morrison (missionary) =

Canadian missionary (1828–1869)

Donald Morrison (5 July 1828 – 23 October 1869) was a Presbyterian missionary from Nova Scotia to the New Hebrides (now known as Vanuatu). He was born and grew up in Cape Breton, and went to the New Hebrides in 1864, serving on the island of Efate. He translated the Gospel of Mark into the Erakor dialect of Efate. This was printed in Sydney in 1866, making it the first book printed in any dialect of Efate. In 1869, Morrison left the New Hebrides due to ill health, and died in Auckland. His daughter was headmistress Annie Christina Morrison. His son Alexander Samuel Morrison was a minister in Rakaia, New Zealand and died in 1939.

J. Graham Miller suggests that Morrison was "fearless among the heathen, gentle among the Christians, and at all times a humble servant of the Master." Miller notes that the Efatese people honour him as the first European missionary to their island, and that Morrison is a popular name for boys among Efatese-speaking people.
