= Melanie Hulme =

New Zealand softball player

Personal information
- Born: 16 December 1976 (age 49)

Sport
- Country: New Zealand
- Sport: Softball

Melanie Hulme (born 16 December 1976) is a New Zealand softball player. She competed at the 2000 Summer Olympics in Sydney, where the New Zealand team placed sixth in the women's softball tournament.
