= Donald M. Morrison =

United States Coast Guard vice admiral (1906–1989)

- Born: December 4, 1906; Glens Falls, New York, U.S.
- Died: March 9, 1989 (aged 82); Beaumont, Texas, U.S.
- Military career
- Allegiance: United States
- Branch: United States Coast Guard
- Service years: 1931–1964
- Rank: Vice admiral
- Commands: Vice Commandant of the United States Coast Guard

Donald McGregor Morrison (December 4, 1906 – March 9, 1989) was a vice admiral in the United States Coast Guard who served as the eighth Vice Commandant of the United States Coast Guard from 1962 to 1964.

== Early life ==
Morrison was born on December 4, 1906, at Glens Falls, New York, the youngest of three children of John R. and Mary Burch Morrison. At the age of eight his family moved to Vancouver, British Columbia, Canada, where he graduated from King George High School in 1925. He studied civil engineering at the University of Chattanooga and at the University of Washington, enrolling in the latter's Naval Reserve Officer Training Corps (ROTC) unit.

He left college to work as a civil service employee with the U.S. Army Corps of Engineers on a survey project of the Tennessee River. In 1928, he entered the United States Coast Guard Academy with an appointment as cadet and was graduated with a commission as an ensign on May 15, 1931.

== Career ==
From the academy he was assigned first to the USCGC Haida at Seattle, then to the USCGC Snohomish at Port Angeles, and in August 1931, was stationed aboard the USCGC Tallapoosa which was based at Juneau. Transferred in March 1934; he served as navigator first in the USCGC Gresham and then in the USCGC Seneca out of Mobile. At the decommissioning of the latter in 1935, he was assigned as a student engineer aboard the USCGC Pontchartrain which operated out of New York City. While with that vessel; he served on the 1936 and 1937 International Ice Patrol. During the Ohio River flood of 1937, he was assigned temporarily to assist the Coast Guard flood relief forces at Cairo.

In April 1938, he reported to the USCGC Northland at Seattle to serve as engineer officer during her last Arctic mission from the West Coast. After decommissioning of the vessel at Oakland; he instructed licensed Merchant Marine personnel in marine engineering at the Maritime Service Training Station on Government Island.

When the Northland was recommissioned in June 1939, he accompanied her to Boston, to assist in her outfitting for the second Byrd Antarctic Expedition. With the eruption of hostilities in Europe in September 1939, the Northland was withdrawn from the expedition and returned to Alameda. The following month of May, he sailed with that cutter to the New York Navy Yard where she was fitted for special duty in Greenland. He continued serving as her engineer officer and also as her executive officer until May 1941, during which time he made two extended cruises to Greenland.

During the next two years; he was assigned to the Cooper Bessemer Corporation at Grove City, as chief machinery inspector for a new 180-foot class of buoy tenders, and at the Marine Iron and Shipbuilding Co. and Zenith Dredge Co. at Duluth to supervise the installation of machinery, tests, and trial runs of those vessels. At completion of the project, he was assigned as Coast Guard representative in the Office of Inspector of Machinery, U.S. Navy, at the plant of Fairbanks-More Corp in Beloit, for Diesel engines being built for Wind-class icebreaker. These icebreakers were designed by the Coast Guard for Arctic duty as a result of the war emergency and were then under construction. He had the additional duties at that time of training Naval and Coast Guard personnel in the operation of engines used in submarines, destroyers, as well as in Coast Guard icebreakers.

In August 1943, he became engineer officer of the attack troop transport USS Cambria while she was undergoing conversion at the Todd Hoboken Plant. A Commander at that time, he served as her executive officer in the Marshall Islands campaigns at Majuro, Kwajalein, and Eniwetok. In April 1944, he was reassigned to the troop transport USS General M. C. Meigs which was then being built at the Federal Shipbuilding Company. After commissioning of that vessel, he was her engineer officer while she engaged in transporting troops from Norfolk, to the Mediterranean.

In September 1944, he was assigned as training officer and later as executive officer at the Coast Guard Training Station in Groton. Reporting next to the attack troop transport USS Joseph T. Dickman at Eniwetok in August 1945, he served first as her executive officer and later as her commanding officer. The Dickman, with him aboard, was one of the first transports to return a large number of recovered allied POWs from the Philippines to the United States, and later participated in the "Magic Carpet" program of returning military personnel from the Pacific to home shores.

After decommissioning of the Dickman in March 1946 and until June 1959, he served as Chief, Marine Engineering Section, then as Chief, Engineering Division in the 14th Coast Guard District office at Honolulu. Stationed next in the 17th Coast Guard District office at Juneau, he served there as Chief, Engineering Division and also as an aide to Governor Ernest Gruening.

From September 1952 to July 1954, he commanded the USCGC Bibb which operated out of Boston, as an ocean station (weather) patrol vessel in the North Atlantic. He was then assigned to the Naval War College for a course of instructions in naval warfare. Completing the course in July 1955, he became Chief, Shore Units Division at Coast Guard Headquarters in Washington, D.C. In June 1958, he was reassigned as special assistant to the Commandant of the Coast Guard. One year later he became Chief, Operations Division at the 5th Coast Guard District office which was then located in Norfolk. In June 1960, he reported in San Francisco to assume the double duties of Deputy Commander, Western Area and Chief of Staff of the 12th Coast Guard District.

With the nomination of the President on February 3, 1961, and the consent of the Senate, the then Captain Morrison was appointed to the permanent grade of Rear Admiral to rank from February 1, 1961. He took his oath of office on March 24. Concurrent with that appointment he received orders to report to Coast Guard Headquarters for duty as Chief, Office of Operations in June 1961. He was designated Chief of Staff of the Coast Guard on June 1, 1962.

Again with the nomination of the President (June 20, 1962) and consent of the Senate, he was sworn in as Vice Commandant of the Coast Guard with the permanent rank of Vice Admiral; July 3, 1962. Morrison retired from that post on July 1, 1964, receiving the Legion of Merit for outstanding service covering the term of his duties as Assistant Commandant. He was succeeded by William D. Shields.

Vice Admiral Morrison's World War II campaign service medals and ribbons include the following: American Defense Service Medal with "A"; Asiatic-Pacific Campaign Medal (one star); European-African-Middle Eastern Campaign Medal; World War II Victory Medal.

== Personal ==
Morrison was married to the former Betty I. of Dayton, Washington. They had two children, Donald McGregor, Jr., a former Lieutenant Commander in the Coast Guard; and Permelia Ann, wife of former Lieutenant James E. Brown, Jr., USCG.

Morrison died on 9 March 1989 in Beaumont, Texas and was interred in Arlington National Cemetery. His plot can be found in section 2-DD,27,2.

== Effective Dates of Promotion ==
1928 Cadet, US Coast Guard Academy
Ensign on May 15, 1931
Lieutenant Junior Grade, May 15, 1934
Lieutenant, May 15, 1936
Lieutenant Commander, June 15, 1942
Commander, November 1, 1942
Captain, August 6, 1951
Rear Admiral, February 1, 1961
Rear Admiral, Presumably not held
Vice Admiral, July 3, 1962

Military offices
Preceded by Edwin J. Roland	Assistant Commandant of the Coast Guard; 1962–1964	Succeeded by William D. Shields
