= Peter Dronke =

German literary scholar (1934–2020)

Ernst Peter Michael Dronke (30 May 1934 – 19 April 2020) was a scholar specialising in Medieval Latin literature. He was one of the 20th century's leading scholars of medieval Latin lyric, and his book The Medieval Lyric (1968) is considered the standard introduction to the subject.

== Life and career ==
Dronke was born in 1934 in Cologne, Rhine, Prussia, Germany, the son of Maria Dronke (born Minnie Kronfeld), a prominent actress, and Adolf John Rudolf Dronke, a judge. His mother was born Jewish, and later converted to Catholicism. In 1939, he left the country because of the Nazi regime, settling in New Zealand and becoming a naturalised New Zealand citizen. Dronke earned his bachelor's and master's degrees at Wellington. In 1955 he received a travelling scholarship to study at Magdalen College, Oxford. After graduating with a first in English, in 1958 Dronke was elected to a three-year Junior Research Fellowship at Merton College. He took up a lectureship in Medieval Latin at the University of Cambridge in 1961 and became a fellow of Clare Hall in 1964. He was awarded a personal readership in 1979 and a personal chair in Medieval Latin literature in 1989. He became a Fellow of the British Academy in 1984. He became a foreign member of the Royal Netherlands Academy of Arts and Sciences in 1997. In 2001, he retired.

Dronke married fellow medievalist Ursula Brown in 1961.

Dronke died on 19 April 2020.

== Selected works ==
- Medieval Latin and the Rise of the European Love-Lyric, 2 vols., (1965–6; 2d ed. 1968)
- The Medieval Lyric (1968; 2d ed. 1978; 3d ed. 1996)
- Poetic Individuality in the Middle Ages: New Departures in Poetry 1000–1500 (1970; 2d ed. 1986)
- Fabula: Explorations into the Uses of Myth in Medieval Platonism (1974)
- Women Writers of the Middle Ages: A Critical Study of Texts from Perpetua to Marguerite Porete (1984)
- Dante and Medieval Latin Traditions (1986)
- A History of Twelfth-Century Western Philosophy, editor (1988)
- Latin and Vernacular Poets of the Middle Ages (1991)
- Intellectuals and Poets in Medieval Europe (1992)
- Nine Medieval Latin Plays, translator (1994)
- Verse with Prose from Petronius to Dante: The Art and Scope of the Mixed Form (1994)
- Sources of Inspiration: Studies in Literary Transformations, 400–1500 (1997)
- Imagination in the Late Pagan and Early Christian World: The First Nine Centuries A.D. (2003)
- The Spell of Calcidius: Platonic Concepts and Images in the Medieval West (2008)
