= Vanuu =

- Village
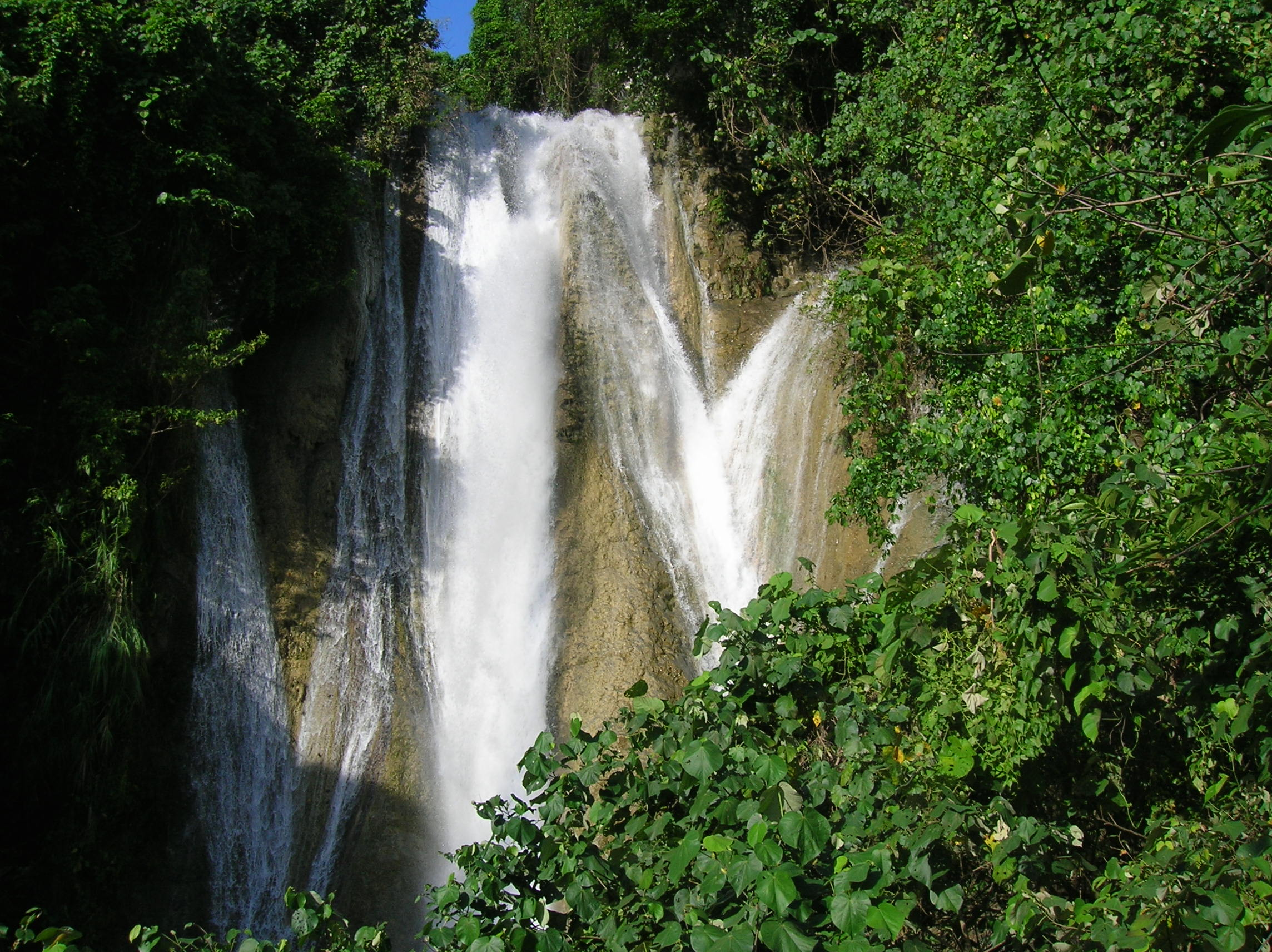
- The main waterfall at Vanuu

- Location in Vanuatu
- Coordinates: 15°46′5″S 168°9′50″E
- Country: Vanuatu
- Province: Penama Province
- Island: Pentecost Island
- Time zone: UTC+11 (VUT)

Vanuu (from Sowa van uu "under the noise"), also known as Waterfall Village, is a settlement on the southwestern coast of Pentecost Island in Vanuatu. The village was founded as a coconut plantation in the mid 20th century, and now consists of scattered groups of houses within the no-longer-productive plantation.

Vanuu is located on Pentecost's main north-south road, about 9 kilometres (5.6 mi) north of Lonorore Airport and about 8 kilometres (5.0 mi) south of Melsisi.

Vanuu has a Churches of Christ church, a nakamal, small stores, and a guesthouse. Children from Vanuu attend the Anglophone primary school at Ranmawot, 2 kilometres away. Ranwadi High School is also nearby.

The large waterfall and associated natural swimming pool behind the village, and the presence of good anchorage for yachts, make Vanuu a popular destination for visitors to Pentecost Island. The waterfall behind Vanuu is one of seven major falls along the river; the others are located high in the bush. There is also a limestone cave nearby. Although Vanuu is not located within the area in which land diving is practised, it is sometimes used as a base by tourists who visit Pentecost to witness the ceremony.

== History and geography ==
The flat coastal strip on which Vanuu is built was historically uninhabited and covered with dense cottonwood (burao) trees. The area suffered drastic depopulation in the late 19th and early 20th century following the introduction of European diseases. The present village was founded in the early-mid 20th century by men from other areas of Pentecost, who established a coconut plantation for the production of copra (though this is no longer productive today). Many of their grandchildren (Vanuu's present inhabitants) retain ties to their ancestral villages.

Most villagers maintain gardens in the mountains above Vanuu, growing vegetables such as taro for local consumption and earning income from cash crops such as kava. Fees paid by visitors to the waterfall, and earnings from other tourist-related activities, are also a source of income.

== Language and culture ==
The language and culture of the Vanuu area were historically intermediate between those of Central Pentecost and of South Pentecost, although the influence of the former predominates today.

The area's original language was Sowa, but depopulation in the 20th century led to the extinction of this language. Today Apma (the original language of Central Pentecost to the north) is the village's main language, though village chief Isaiah Tabi Vahka is at the forefront of efforts to document and revive Sowa. The national language Bislama is also spoken, and the village is home to a number of Ske speakers due to intermarriage with the Baravet community to the south. English is also spoken by educated villagers.
