= Ranwadi High School =

Co-educational boarding school on Pentecost, Vanuatu

Graduation Day at Ranwadi

Ranwadi School (officially known since 2003 as Ranwadi Churches of Christ College) is a co-educational boarding school on Pentecost, Vanuatu. The school has over 300 students who come from all over Pentecost Island and from other parts of Vanuatu. Lisepsep inhabit the forests around the school.

The school is situated 11 km north of Lonorore airport on a coastal hillside adjacent to the village of Vanwoki. The name is a shortening of ranwadikon which meant "on a heap of sand" in the Sowa language. Strictly this name refers to the coastal area below the school.

Ranwadi is a Churches of Christ mission school and is run along strongly religious lines; the school's motto is Luke 2:52 "And Jesus increased in wisdom and stature, and in favour with God and man." (KJV)

The school's main source of income is the school fees paid by its students, although it also receives some funding from church and government sources. Major development projects at the school have often been funded by overseas aid. In 2005-2006 a major improvement programme was carried out with the help of AusAID (the Australian Agency for International Development).

Although the majority of the staff are local, in the 1990s and 2000s under Principal Silas Buli the school also welcomed a large number of expatriate teachers. Most of these were affiliated with volunteer organisations such as Latitude Global Volunteering (formerly GAP Activity Projects), Project Pacific, VSA, Peace Corps and church mission groups.

== History ==
Ranwadi traces its origins to 1902, when a local man named Willie Tabimamkan returned from working on a Queensland sugar plantation with a "burning desire" to tell people about Jesus. Tabimamkan wrote to Australia asking for help, and in response, a missionary named John Thompson arrived in 1903. Malaria forced Thompson to leave later that year, but his arrival marked the beginning of the work of the Churches of Christ Overseas Mission Board in the area, which continues to this day. The next white missionary was Frank Filmer, who stayed at Ranwadi from 1908 until 1912.

Tabimamkan died in 1918, and there is no record of what happened at Ranwadi from then until 1934, when another missionary, Mr Sandalls, arrived. He left due to ill health, and was replaced by another missionary, Mr Dow, who stayed at Ranwadi from 1937 to 1939. After this the school was temporarily abandoned and became overgrown, although the work of baptising people into the Churches of Christ was continued by local villagers.

In 1946, a missionary couple named Jack and Dorothy Smith established a mission station at Ranmawot, 3 km south of Ranwadi. A small primary school was established here, although the site proved too small, and in 1955 work began on building a new school at the old Ranwadi site, under the leadership of Owen Jones, a teacher newly arrived from Ballarat, Australia. The school was gradually developed there under a succession of missionaries, including Frank Beale (1957), Fred Reynolds (1958–1959), Jack Edwards and his wife (1959–1968) and Beth Clapp (1969–1970). The school originally took only boys, but under Mr & Mrs Edwards girls began to be admitted.

In 1971, as the islanders' educational standard improved, Ranwadi was transformed into a secondary school, while a primary school was re-established at Ranmawot. Ranwadi continued to be run by Australian missionaries: Ray Wilson and his wife (1971–1973), Ken Warne and his wife (1974–1978), Jenny Marshall (1978–1980) and Lyall Muller (1981–1985).

In colonial days, Ranwadi owned a large tract of surrounding land, on which students cultivated their own food. However, following Vanuatu's independence in 1980, the school faced demands from traditional landowners for the return of their ancestral land. The ensuing land dispute was solved by the signing of a Lease Agreement under which Ranwadi kept the core of its land in return for a small annual rent payment to the villagers. The remainder of the land was returned to its traditional owners. Although the agreement led to good relations between the school and the surrounding communities, it also left the school dependent on imported foodstuffs which represent a major drain on the school's budget and a cause of malnutrition among its students.

The new Vanuatu government's desire to see schools run by local people rather than overseas missionaries led to the appointment in 1986 of Silas Buli, from nearby Vanuu (Waterfall village), as principal (1986-2009). Although very young and inexperienced at the time of his appointment, Silas enjoyed a long and successful term at Ranwadi, and won a great deal of respect from those who worked with him. Since 2009 the school has had several principals and acting principals including Silas Tabi, Stephen Toa, Albert Bule, Royal Bebe, Maxly Viro, Caulton Bule and Albion Tabi.

== Curriculum ==
Ranwadi offers education from Year 7 to Year 13 (students aged between approximately 12 and 20 years).

Year 7 - 10 students ("juniors") follow a standard curriculum set by the Vanuatu Ministry of Education, culminating in national exams at the end of Year 10 which determine students' future progress. Year 11, 12 and 13 students ("seniors") study towards Vanuatu National Secondary Certificates (VNSC) and Vanuatu University Entrance Certificates (VUEC).

The language of instruction at Ranwadi is English, although in informal settings, teachers and students mostly communicate in Bislama or their vernacular languages.

Christianity is a major part of school life, with students attending twice-daily services in the chapel, in addition to other religious events such as Easter baptisms, which are held in the saltwater pool below the school. Helping students get to know Jesus is considered by many to be the school's number one priority.

The school competes at the PISSA Games (a provincial inter-school tournament), and hosted the Games in 2008 and 2018. The major sports played at the school are football, netball, volleyball, basketball and athletics.

== Facilities ==
By rural Vanuatu standards, Ranwadi is well resourced, thanks largely to donations from overseas aid agencies and other foreign benefactors. However, good maintenance of buildings and equipment is difficult due to the damp tropical climate and isolated location, and the school was badly damaged by Cyclone Harold in 2020.

The school buildings comprise twelve ordinary classrooms, two science laboratories, four technology rooms, a computer room, a staff room, a large library, offices, a dining hall and kitchen, a chapel, a mechanic's workshop, an aid post staffed by a nurse, a small shop, boys' and girls' dormitories, and staff houses. Teachers' houses are located close to the main school buildings, while ancillary staff such as the driver, nurse and boarding master are housed on the shoreside strip below the school.

A large sports ground below the school, with a football pitch and three basketball/volleyball/netball/futsal courts, is shared by the school and the local community.

Small gardens around the school are used by students for agriculture classes.

Electricity is provided by solar panels, a diesel-powered generator, and since 2026 a local micro-hydro grid. Water is supplied from a spring on the mountainside above the school, via a system of pipes and tanks which also serve neighbouring villages. Rainwater tanks collecting the run-off from roofs provide an additional source of water, as well as helping to prevent erosion, which is an issue in parts of the school.

Transport of students and supplies to and from the school occurs primarily by ship, although some also arrive by air from Port Vila and Santo, or by road from neighbouring parts of Pentecost. Cargo ships, which pass along the coast of Pentecost approximately twice per week, put ashore either at the beach by the school sports field (although access here is somewhat difficult due to the presence of a reef), or at nearby Vanuu (Waterfall Village). The school owns a 'truck' (four-wheel-drive utility vehicle) which is used for transport of staff, students and supplies to and from the landing point, the airport, the bank and hospital at nearby Melsisi, and other locations.
