= Seke language =

Seke might be:

- The Seki language of Equatorial Guinea and Gabon
- The Thakali language of Nepal
- The Ske language of Pentecost Island, Vanuatu
