= Panngi =

- Village
- Location in Vanuatu
- Coordinates: 15°56′53″S 168°11′35″E
- Country: Vanuatu
- Province: Penama Province
- Island: Pentecost Island
- Time zone: UTC+11 (VUT)

Panngi (from Sa pan ngi "under the native almond tree") is a large village in south-western Pentecost Island, Vanuatu. It is the main commercial centre of south Pentecost.

== Overview ==
Panngi is located approximately 10 km south of Lonorore Airport. The village has an Anglophone primary school, a church, a bank, a clinic, kava bars, guesthouses, and several stores. Panngi merges into the adjacent villages of Salap and Bay Homo.

Between April and June the village receives large numbers of visitors who come to watch the land diving ceremony, which is performed at a site just above the village. Most of these visitors arrive on cruise ships, which dock at a small jetty named the Queen Elizabeth II Landing, in honour of a 1974 visit by the Queen.

At the tip of the headland north of Panngi is a large and unusually-shaped rock, known as Captain Cook's Rock or the Mushroom Rock, which is surrounded by water at high tide.
