= Sowa language =

Extinct language spoken in Vanuatu

Sowa
- Native to: Vanuatu
- Region: Pentecost Island
- Extinct: c. 2000, with the death of Maurice Tabi
- Language family: Austronesian: Malayo-Polynesian; Oceanic; Southern Oceanic; North-Central Vanuatu; Central Vanuatu; Sowa

Language codes
- ISO 639-3: sww
- Glottolog: sowa1244
- ELP: Sowa
- Sowa is classified as Critically Endangered by the UNESCO Atlas of the World's Languages in Danger.

Sowa was the original language of south-central Pentecost island in Vanuatu. In the 20th century it was totally displaced by Apma, a neighbouring language. Sowa was closely related to Ske, another south Pentecost language.

Sowa was originally spoken on both western and eastern sides of Pentecost. The river at Melsisi formed the language's north-western boundary, and its range extended southwards to a creek near the village of Levizendam.

Following the depopulation of Pentecost that occurred after the introduction of European diseases, men from Sowa-speaking areas were married women from other parts of Pentecost, who were mostly Apma speakers. As a result, by the 1960s, Apma had totally replaced Sowa as the predominant local language. The last native Sowa speakers died around the year 2000.

Today, a few local people whose fathers or mothers were Sowa speakers still remember parts of the language, although none speak it fluently. A few local people compiled short written notes on Sowa in an attempt to ensure that the language was not lost. The only linguist to have studied Sowa while the language was still alive was David Walsh, who collected a vocabulary list in 1969. Chief Isaiah Tabi of Waterfall village and Andrew Gray, a British schoolteacher at Ranwadi College, have worked with speakers' children to try to reconstruct the basics of the language.

Some people in the former Sowa area see the language as a part of their cultural heritage and lament its loss. There is talk of reviving Sowa, although records are insufficient to allow a fully authentic restoration of the language.

== Status as a language ==
Sowa was closely related to neighbouring Ske language. In his 1976 survey of New Hebrides Languages, Darrell Tryon classified Sowa as a separate language, calculating its cognacy with Ske at 77% (with 80% being the approximate threshold below which two forms are considered separate languages rather than mere dialects). However, in their 2001 survey, Lynch & Crowley did not recognise Sowa as a language, noting that Tryon's data suffered from significant margins of error.

Using an updated word list, Andrew Gray calculated the cognacy of Sowa and Ske at 82%. Sowa's status as a language is therefore borderline if considered on the basis of cognacy figures alone. However, local people perceive Sowa very much as a distinct language and not as a Ske dialect, and there are significant grammatical and phonological differences between Sowa and Ske.

== Phonology ==
The consonants of Sowa were b, d, g, k, l, m, n, ng (as in English "singer"), p, r, s, t, bilabial v, w, z, and labiovelar bw, mw and pw. Sowa appears to have lacked h, although this letter occasionally appears in records of Sowa as a result of un-phonetic spelling and interference from other languages.

There were fewer restrictions on the distribution of consonants than in Apma and Raga. However, it appears that consonants occurring at the end of an utterance were modified according to Apma-like rules, with b, v and w converted to p, d devoiced to t, g devoiced to k, and r dropped to produce a long vowel. Clusters of consonants within syllables were not permitted.

Unlike in neighbouring Ske, there was no prenasalization of consonants in Sowa.

In addition to the five standard vowels (a, e, i, o and u), Sowa appears to have had mid-high vowels é (intermediate between e and i) and ó (intermediate between o and u), like in Ske and Sa languages.

Long vowels (aa, ee, etc.) occurred as a result of the dropping of r at the ends of words, and are shown to have been distinct from short vowels by minimal pairs such as me "to be red" and mee (< mer) "to be black".

== Grammar ==
Because no linguist ever worked directly with a native Sowa speaker, the language's grammar is poorly known. However, some of the basics can be deduced from the phrases that are remembered.

=== Pronouns ===
Personal pronouns were distinguished by person and number. They were not distinguished by gender. Like in Ske, there was no distinction between dual and plural in independent pronouns, but separate dual forms of subject markers did exist (see below).

The basic pronouns in Sowa were:

		singular	plural
1st person	exclusive	nou	kamwam
1st person	inclusive	nou	éd
2nd person		ék	kimi
3rd person		ni	néé

=== Nouns ===
Nouns in Sowa were generally not preceded by articles. Plurality was indicated by placing the pronoun néé ("them") or a number after the noun.

Nouns could be either free, or directly possessed. Directly possessed nouns were suffixed to indicate whom an item belonged to. For example:

dolok = my voice
dolom = your voice
dolon = his/her voice
dolon dasék = my mother's voice

Possession could also be indicated by the use of possessive classifiers, separate words that occur before or after the noun and take possessive suffixes. These classifiers were similar to those of Apma:

- no- for general possessions (nok wokat, "my basket")
- bile- for things that are cared for, such as crops and livestock (biled bó, "our pig")
- a- for things to be eaten (an bwet, "his taro")
- me- for things to be drunk (mem ré, "your water")

There was also an associative construction, like that of Apma and Ske, for possessions over which the possessor has no control (vénu naik, "my home island")

The possessive suffixes were as follows:

		singular	plural
1st person	inclusive	-(i)k	-d
1st person	exclusive	-(i)k	-mwam
2nd person		-m	-mi
3rd person		-n	(lengthened vowel)
Generic		-gze	

A verb could be transformed into a noun by the addition of a nominalising suffix -an:

bwal = to fight (verb)
bwalan = a fight (noun)

Modifiers generally came after a noun:

vat = stone
vat alok = big stone
vat iru = two stones

Like in Apma, demonstratives came in three main forms:

gané = this one (near speaker)
gano = that one (near listener)
gazai = that one (away from both speaker and listener)

=== Verbs ===
Verbs were preceded by markers providing information on the subject and the tense, aspect and mood of an action. Like in Ske, these may have been complicated and subject to some variation, but the following commonly occur:

Person	Subject marker - imperfective (present tense)	Subject marker - perfective (past tense)	Subject marker - irrealis (future tense)	English
1st person singular	mwi	ni, i	mwidi	"I"
2nd person singular	kimwa	ki, ti	kidi	"you" (singular)
3rd person singular	mwa, mwe, mo, mu	a	de	"he" / "she" / "it"
1st person plural (inclusive)	tapa, tapan, tapat			"we" (you and I)
1st person plural (exclusive)	kapa, kapan, kapat			"we" (others and I)
2nd person plural	kipa, pin, kipat			"you" (plural)
3rd person plural	pa, pan, pat	ava, an, avat	deva, den, devat	"they"

Plural subject markers all took at least three forms: one ending with -n, one ending with -t, and one ending with a vowel. The -n forms appear to have been used where the following word began with a labial consonant such as b, m or v (pan ba "they go"), the -t forms where the following word began with a coronal consonant such as d or r (pat du "they stay"), and the vowel-ending forms with 'bound' verbs where the verb root began with a consonant cluster (palse "they see"). In first and second person plural forms, tense/aspect/mood may have been distinguished only through context and through accompanying words such as avé "it was..." and devé "it will be...".

There is evidence for additional subject markers or verb-modifying particles used for prospective, hortative and/or hypothetical actions (tete va "let's go!") but these are poorly remembered.

Dual (two-person) forms incorporating a particle ra also existed, as in Ske, but are not well remembered.

Like in Ske, there was an echo subject marker (singular la, plural lapa):

an ba lapa los = They went to swim

Verb-initial consonant mutation occurred in a few common verbs such as ba~va "go", but does not appear to have been as widespread as in Apma and Ske:

mwa ba = it goes
a va = it went

Negative phrases began with atna ("absent"):

ni iko = I did it
atna ni iko = I didn't do it

In the imperative, verbs could occur on their own (unlike in Apma and Ske, in which they are always preceded by a subject marker). Verbs beginning with a pair of consonants acquired an extra vowel in this situation:

mwi lse = I see
Lese! = Look!

Transitive and intransitive verb forms were distinguished, like in Apma and Ske. Transitive forms were commonly followed with the suffix or instrumental preposition né:

mwi rós = I move
mwi rós né vat = I move the stone

Like neighbouring languages, Sowa made extensive use of stative verbs for descriptive purposes.

Verbs in Sowa could be linked together in serial verb constructions.

== Sample phrases ==
English	Sowa
Where are you going?	Kimwa ba sawót?
I'm going to...	Mwi ba...
Where have you come from?	Ki mai sawót?
I've come from...	Ni mai...
Where is it?	Mudu sawót?
It's here	Mudu igené
Come here!	Mai igené!
Go away!	Suk met!
What's your name?	Sém né sinan?
My name is...	Sék né...
Where are you from?	Ék azó ze sawót?
I am from...	Nou azó ze...
How much? / How many?	Ivis?
one	tuwal / izuwal
two	iru
three	izól
four	ivét
five	ilim
Thank you	(Ki mwa) baréw
It's just fine	Awé ganek / Adwus ganék
