= Sara Airport =

Airport in Vanuatu

- IATA: SSR; ICAO: NVSH

Summary
- Airport type: Public
- Serves: northern Pentecost Island, Vanuatu
- Coordinates: 15°28′15″S 168°09′08″E

Map
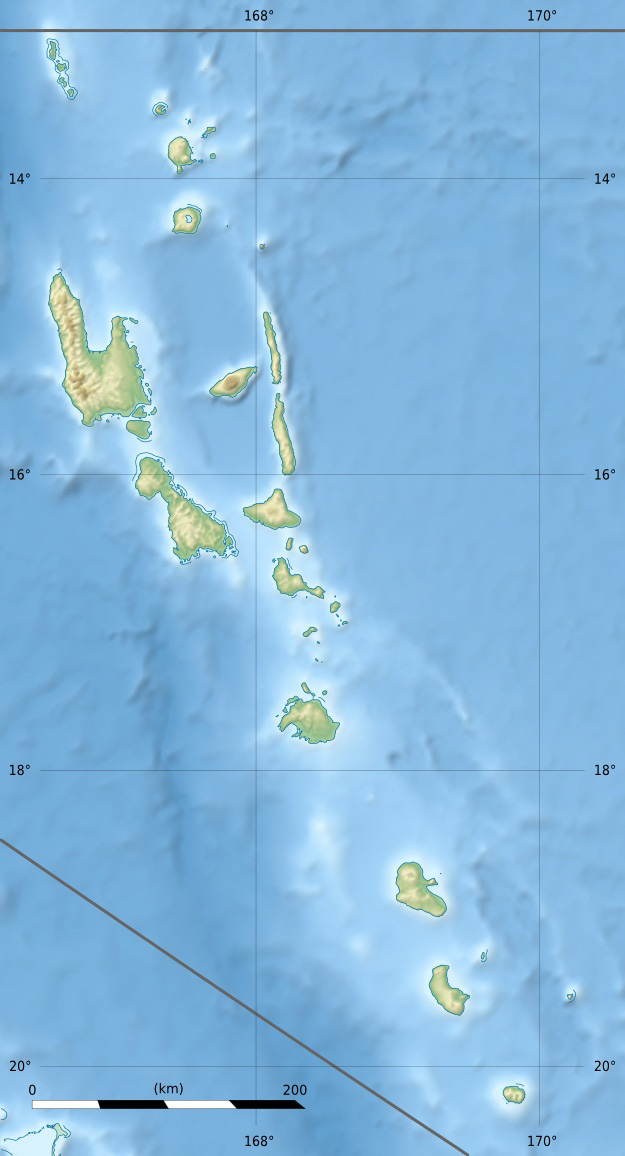
- Location of airport in Vanuatu

Runways
| Direction | Length | | Surface |
| Direction | m | ft | Surface |
|---|---|---|---|
| | | | grass |
- Source: GCM, STV

Sara Airport (IATA: SSR, ICAO: NVSH) is an airport on northern Pentecost Island, Vanuatu.

== Overview ==
Sara is a short grass airstrip built across a hilltop, next to the village of Arongbwaratu. Sara does not suffer from the problems of waterlogging that formerly afflicted Lonorore, Pentecost's other airport, although the airport's high location makes it vulnerable to disruption in windy weather. Following the 2008-2009 upgrading of Lonorore, and improvements in the reliability and frequency of shipping to Pentecost, Sara Airport has declined slightly in importance, although it remains a valuable transport link for the communities of northern Pentecost.

Sara is the word for "field" in Raga language. Locals may refer to the airstrip as saran plen ("field of planes") or saran wangga gaga ("field of flying craft") to avoid ambiguity.

== Airlines and destinations ==
Air Vanuatu connects Sara Airport to Santo-Pekoa International Airport (Luganville) and Port Vila International Airport.
