= Baravet =

- Village
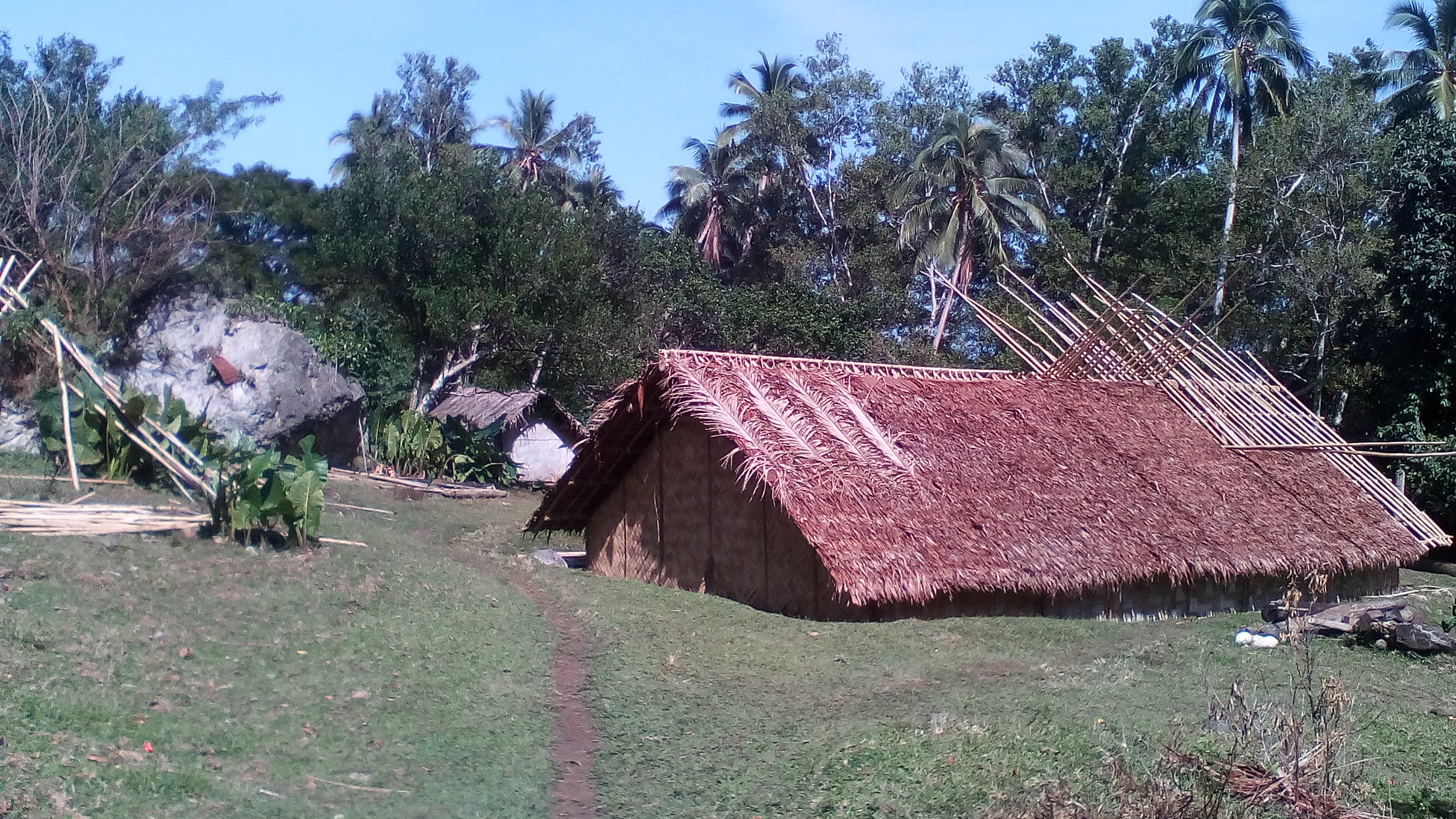
- Newly built nakamal in the centre of Baravet

- Location in Vanuatu
- Coordinates: 15°49′30″S 168°10′05″E
- Country: Vanuatu
- Province: Penama Province
- Island: Pentecost Island
- Time zone: UTC+11 (VUT)

Baravet or Bwaravet (from Ske bwara vet "big stone") is a cluster of villages in south-western Pentecost Island, Vanuatu.

The main village of Baravet is located by a river mouth on the coast, along the main north–south road 3 km north of Lonorore Airport. The community has a nakamal, a guesthouse and several small stores. The main village comprises the hamlets of Vanambil, Sovlet and Lalpseh. At Vastamit, across the river from the main village, are a Churches of Christ church and kindergarten.

Baravet is the hub of the Ske language community, and has a traditional identity distinct from that of other parts of Central Pentecost and South Pentecost. The term 'Baravet' is sometimes used to refer to the entire Ske cultural area.

Baravet was severely damaged by Cyclone Harold in April 2020, with the nakamal and the majority of houses destroyed.
