= Cyclone Harold =

Category 5 South Pacific cyclone in 2020

Severe Tropical Cyclone Harold
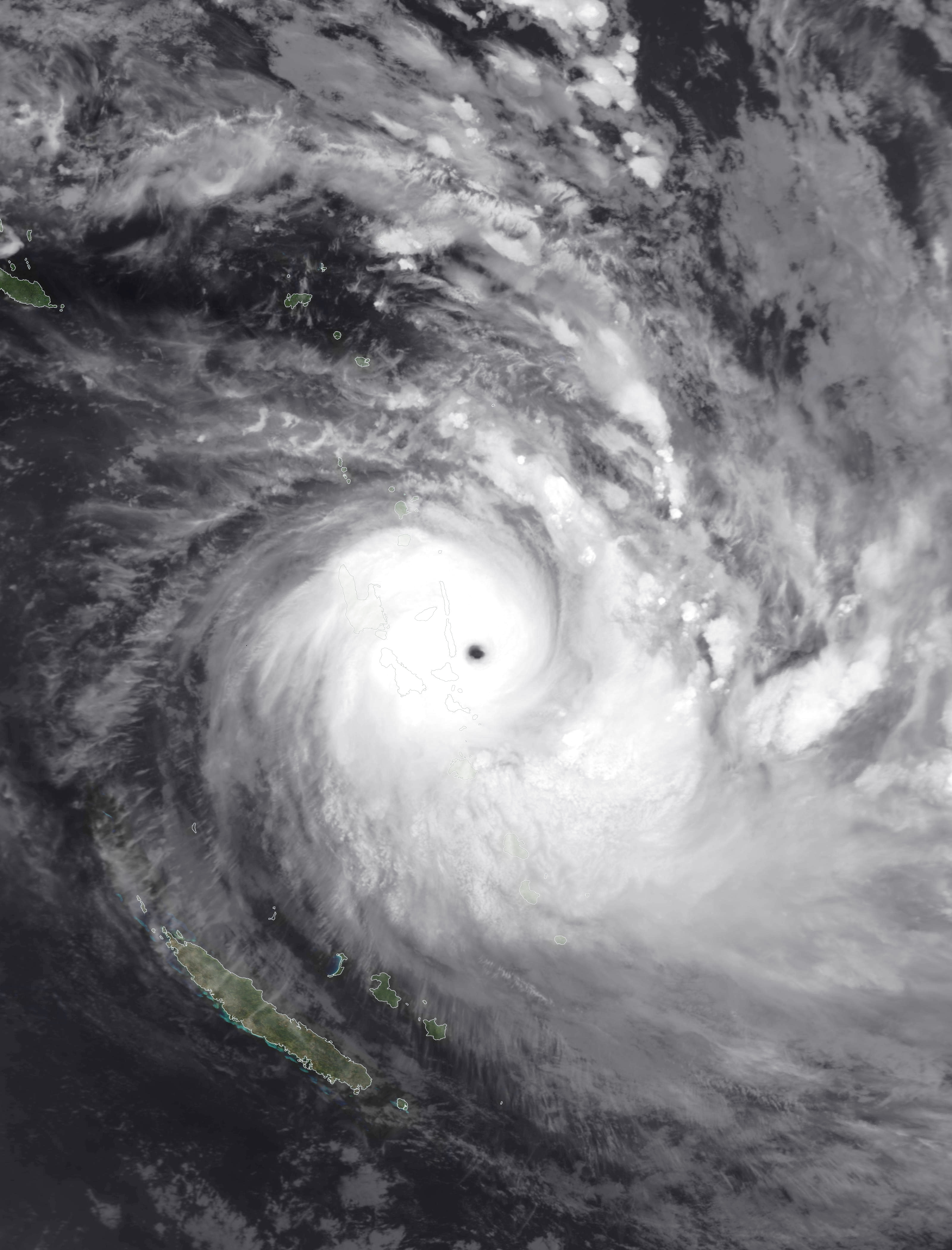
- Cyclone Harold at peak intensity shortly after crossing Vanuatu on April 6

Meteorological history
- Formed: April 1, 2020
- Extratropical: April 10, 2020
- Dissipated: April 11, 2020

Category 5 severe tropical cyclone
- 10-minute sustained (FMS)
- Highest winds: 230 km/h (145 mph)
- Highest gusts: 325 km/h (200 mph)
- Lowest pressure: 920 hPa (mbar); 27.17 inHg

Category 5-equivalent tropical cyclone
- 1-minute sustained (SSHWS/JTWC)
- Highest winds: 280 km/h (175 mph)
- Lowest pressure: 909 hPa (mbar); 26.84 inHg

Overall effects
- Fatalities: 31
- Missing: 22
- Damage: $768 million (2020 USD) (Costliest in Vanuatu history)
- Areas affected: Solomon Islands, Vanuatu, Fiji, Tonga
- IBTrACS /
- Part of the 2019–20 South Pacific and Australian region cyclone seasons

Severe Tropical Cyclone Harold was a very powerful tropical cyclone which caused widespread destruction in the Solomon Islands, Vanuatu, Fiji, and Tonga during April 2020. It was the first Category 5 tropical cyclone in 2020. The seventh named storm of the 2019–20 Australian region cyclone season, eighth named storm, and fourth severe tropical cyclone of the 2019–20 South Pacific cyclone season, Harold was first noted as a developing tropical low within a trough of low pressure during April 1, while it was located to the east of Papua New Guinea. Over the next day, the system moved south-eastwards over the Solomon Sea, before it was classified as a tropical cyclone and named Harold by the Australian Bureau of Meteorology. The system moved into the Fiji Meteorological Service's area of responsibility on April 2 and began to explosively intensify by April 3, reaching Category 4 status by April 4 on both scales. The next day, it further strengthened into a Category 5 severe tropical cyclone, the highest rating on the Australian scale. It made landfall on Espiritu Santo on April 6 and the next day, strengthening to its peak intensity, attaining Category 5-equivalent intensity on the Saffir–Simpson scale before making landfall on Pentecost Island. Moving east, it weakened below Category 5 intensity on both scales over subsequent days. It regained Category 5 severe tropical cyclone status (on the Australian scale only) while passing south of Fiji, before weakening and becoming extratropical on April 9.

Harold was the first Category 5 severe tropical cyclone to occur in the South Pacific basin since Cyclone Gita in 2018 and was also the second-strongest tropical cyclone to ever affect Vanuatu, behind Cyclone Pam in 2015. In total, 27 people died on the MV Taimareho (in the Solomon Islands), two died in Vanuatu, and one died in Fiji. Total damage from the cyclone amounted to $768 million (2020 USD).

== Meteorological history ==
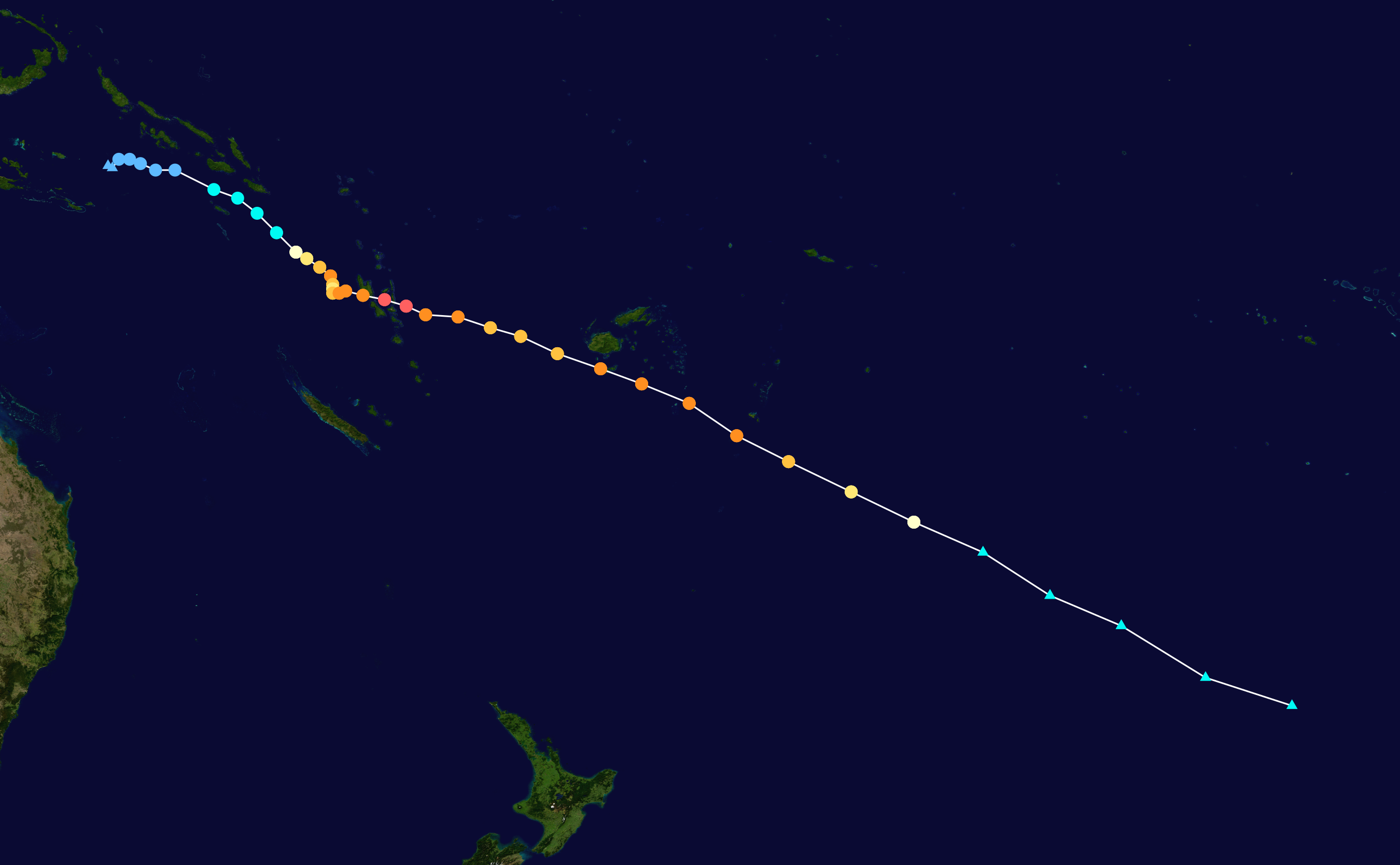
Map plotting the storm's track and intensity, according to the Saffir–Simpson scale Map key Saffir–Simpson scale Tropical depression (≤38 mph, ≤62 km/h) Tropical storm (39–73 mph, 63–118 km/h) Category 1 (74–95 mph, 119–153 km/h) Category 2 (96–110 mph, 154–177 km/h) Category 3 (111–129 mph, 178–208 km/h) Category 4 (130–156 mph, 209–251 km/h) Category 5 (≥157 mph, ≥252 km/h) Unknown Storm type Tropical cyclone Subtropical cyclone Extratropical cyclone, remnant low, tropical disturbance, or monsoon depression

On April 1, the Australian Bureau of Meteorology (BOM) reported that Tropical Low 12U had developed along a trough of low pressure about 825 km (515 mi) to the northeast of Port Moresby in Papua New Guinea. The disturbance initially displayed a broad low-level circulation and scattered atmospheric convection, but it was located within a favourable environment for further development, with developing dual-channel outflow, low vertical wind shear, and warm sea surface temperatures of 30 °C (86 °F). Thunderstorm activity began to coalesce about the centre later that day, and a nearby upper-level low directed the system southeast toward the Solomon Islands. Given the increase in organization, the BOM upgraded the storm to a Category 1 tropical cyclone on the Australian tropical cyclone intensity scale and named it Harold, before it passed about 135 km (85 mi) to the southeast of Honiara in the Solomon Islands. The United States Joint Typhoon Warning Center (JTWC) also initiated advisories on Tropical Cyclone Harold during that day and designated it as Tropical Cyclone 25P. The system subsequently crossed 160°E, where it moved out of the Australian region and into the South Pacific basin, which prompted the BoM to pass the primary warning responsibility to the Fiji Meteorological Service (FMS).

As the storm moved away from the Solomon Islands on April 3, it began to rapidly organise and developed a pinhole eye on microwave imagery. As a result, it was classified as a Category 3 severe tropical cyclone by the FMS at 00:00 UTC on April 4. At this time, Harold was located about 360 km (225 mi) to the northwest of Luganville in Vanuatu, and its southeast movement had slowed significantly as a result of an extension of a subtropical ridge to the storm's east. Later that day, the FMS reported that Harold had become a Category 4 severe tropical cyclone and predicted it to further intensify to Category 5 status, while the system's eye became subsumed into a large mass of atmospheric convection. The JTWC, meanwhile, assessed that Harold had peaked with 1-minute sustained wind speeds of 215 km/h (134 mph), which made it equivalent to a Category 4 hurricane on the Saffir-Simpson hurricane wind scale (SSHWS). During April 5, the JTWC reported that the system had begun to weaken, based on the ragged structure of the eye and warming of the cyclone's cloud tops. However, this weakening phase was short-lived as the system regained a 30 km (20 mi) eye and a symmetric central dense overcast, while upper-level outflow remained strong. The FMS subsequently reported that Harold had become a Category 5 severe tropical cyclone with 10-minute sustained winds of 205 km/h (127 mph). At this time, the system was located about 170 km (105 mi) to the west of Luganville and began to move polewards as a subtropical ridge to its northeast became the primary steering mechanism.

Cyclone Harold rapidly intensifying

At around 22:00 UTC on April 5 (10:00 FST, April 6), Harold made landfall on the island of Espiritu Santo in northern Vanuatu, with 10-minute sustained winds of 215 km/h (134 mph). Harold quickly strengthened upon reemerging over water; early the following day, the FMS reported that Harold had peaked in intensity with 10-minute sustained winds of 230 km/h (140 mph), while it was located between the islands of Espiritu Santo and Pentecost, while the JTWC estimated that its 1-minute sustained winds reached 270 km/h (170 mph), which made it equivalent to a Category 5 hurricane on the SSHWS. The system subsequently made landfall on Pentecost, before reemerging into the South Pacific Ocean and weakening. The landfall weakened Harold and the storm began to show signs of weakening: its eye became cloud-filled, cloud tops warmed, convection reduced in extent, and dry air started to wrap into the system. As a result, the FMS reported that the system had weakened into a Category 4 severe tropical cyclone during April 7, before Harold's eye and eyewall became visible on their radar in Nadi. The system subsequently passed within 115 km (70 mi) of Suva in Fiji, before it passed near or over the Kadavu Group of islands. During April 8, the system intensified slightly before the FMS reported that Harold had become a category 5 severe tropical cyclone again, while it was located about 300 km (185 mi) to the north-east of Nuku'alofa on the Tongan island of Tongatapu. As the system continued to move south-eastwards, it passed about 115 km (70 mi) to the south of Nuku'alofa, as it started to weaken and transition into an extratropical cyclone. During the following day, Harold weakened into a Category 3 severe tropical cyclone as it moved into New Zealand's MetService area of responsibility, while strong vertical wind shear caused atmospheric convection to become displaced to the south of its eye. The JTWC subsequently issued its final advisory on Harold, as it was expected to gain frontal characteristics and complete its extratropical transition within 12 hours. MetService subsequently declared Harold to be an extratropical cyclone during April 10, before the system was last noted during the following day around 1,500 km (930 mi) to the southwest of Adamstown in the Pitcairn Islands.

== Preparations and impact ==
=== Solomon Islands ===
After Harold developed into a tropical cyclone during April 2, the Solomon Islands Meteorological Service issued a tropical cyclone warning for the whole of the island nation. They warned that the system was expected to produce gale-force winds, rough seas, moderate to heavy swells of 2–4 metres (6.6–13.1 ft) and coastal flooding over the islands. As a result, the SIMS urged sea travellers to consider taking actions to ensure their safety and advised motorists to use extreme caution when travelling. The Royal Solomon Island Police Force recommended elevated caution for commuters and mariners.

An estimated 100,000 to 150,000 people in the Solomon Islands experienced Harold's wind, rain, and storm surge. The National Emergency Operations Center indicated that 57 houses were destroyed and another 20 were damaged. Seven classrooms were also destroyed. Falling trees and branches in Honiara resulted in widespread power outages. The National Referral Hospital in Honiara was among the buildings affected by blackouts. Some fallen trees damaged buildings and blocked roads. The San Isidoro school for the deaf outside Honiara was severely damaged, losing its roof. Heavy rainfall flooded the Kukum Highway in Honiara. A stream swollen from the rains washed out a 3 m (9.8 ft) segment of a bridge connecting parts of northwestern Guadalcanal to Honiara. Dozens of families were forced out of their homes on Guadalcanal. Flooding and fallen trees inflicted damage to buildings in Rennell and Bellona Province as well.

On the night of April 2, the ferry MV Taimareho encountered rough seas and gusts of up to 80 km/h (50 mph) generated by Harold in Ironbottom Sound while en route from Taivu to the Aiarai in West Are 'are in Malaita Province. The ship had been sent to evacuate Malaita residents from Honiara as a precautionary measure, though warnings were in effect advising ships to remain in port. Twenty-seven of the 738 passengers were knocked overboard by the waves and are presumed dead; Taimareho later took refuge in Su'u Harbor in Malaita Province. Planes and ships were dispatched to search for survivors across an area larger than 1,000 km^{2} (390 sq mi). Rescue efforts were initially hampered by the inclement conditions; one rescue helicopter could not fly as its second pilot was quarantined. Two bodies were found off the southern coat of Malaita Province, localizing the search region; five further bodies were recovered on 6 April. The Solomon Islands government launched two investigations into the maritime incident, involving a formal inquiry conducted by the Solomon Islands Maritime Safety Administration and a criminal investigation. At least two ships were washed ashore by the storm. Heavy rains from Harold washed out much of the plains in Guadalcanal, reducing the area's food security. The government of Australia donated US$60,000 in relief funds to the Solomon Islands.

=== Vanuatu ===
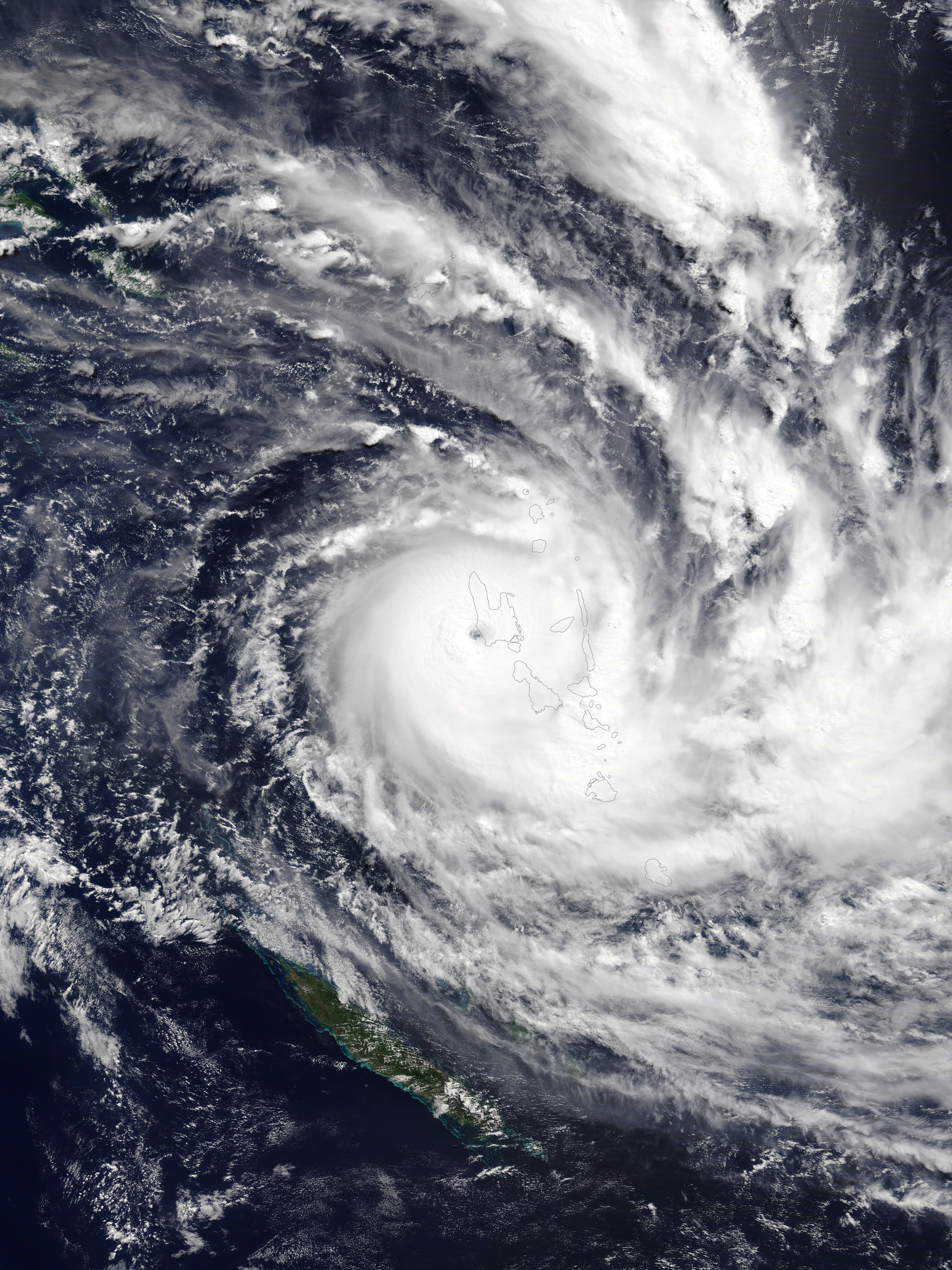
Harold nearing its first landfall on Espiritu Santo on April 5

On April 3, the Vanuatu National Disaster Management Office (VNDMO) issued a yellow alert—indicating the threat of a tropical cyclone within 12 hours—for Torba and Sanma provinces in Vanuatu. The Vanuatu Meteorology and Geo-Hazards Department also issued a tropical cyclone warning for these areas. The yellow alert was upgraded to a red alert—the highest-level warning for Vanuatu—on April 4 following the upgrading of Harold to a Category 3 severe tropical cyclone, while yellow alerts were also issued for Malampa and Penama provinces. Red alerts eventually encompassed Malampa, Penama, Sanma, and Torba provinces, with a yellow alert for Shefa Province. The VNDMO advised for all residents under the red alert to remain indoors. Normal activities were suspended to facilitate preparations and evacuations for Harold. Several evacuation centers were set up for those seeking safe housing as the storm approached.

Hundreds of people evacuated to shelters in Espiritu Santo; disrupted communications in rural areas made estimates difficult, though an official with the Vanuatu Red Cross Society estimated as many as 1,000 people were housed in evacuation centres. On April 5, the International Federation of Red Cross and Red Crescent Societies (IFRC) granted 50,000 CHF from its Disaster Relief Emergency Fund to the Vanuatu Red Cross Society to help better position staff and aid resources prior to the storm's arrival, mobilizing over a thousand volunteers. Preparing for the storm in Luganville, hundreds of people were sent into evacuation centres before the storm. The Torba provincial headquarters in Sola served as a shelter for families. Development organisation Oxfam Australia coordinated with Vanuatuan agencies to develop a response plan for Harold. The Australian Department of Foreign Affairs and Trade also devised a support package for both the Solomon Islands and Vanuatu.

Harold was the first Category 5 severe tropical cyclone on the Australian scale to strike Vanuatu since Cyclone Pam in 2015, bringing gusts above 275 km/h (171 mph) and 250–450 mm (9.8–17.7 in) of rain. Approximately a third of Vanuatu's population was said to have been impacted by the storm across seven islands. Communications were lost in most of the affected areas, particularly in Vanuatu's northern provinces. Telecommunications company Vodafone reported loss of contact with the Banks Islands, Espiritu Santo, Malakula, and Pentecost Island. Connections were reestablished in the hardest-hit areas two days after Harold made landfall. Beginning prior to landfall, the cyclone's slow movement west of Vanuatu drew in copious moisture, resulting in heavy rainfall. Flash flooding forced people to evacuate their homes for higher ground in Espiritu Santo and damaged roads in Penama. On the island of Malakula, rivers overflowed their banks and inundated gardens. Farther south, Aneityum recorded 166 mm (6.5 in) of rain.

Harold moving through Vanuatu throughout April 5 and 6

Modelling from the European Commission's Joint Research Centre suggested that storm surge heights peaked at 0.8 m (2.6 ft) in Vanuatu. Damage was extensive in Espiritu Santo where Harold first made landfall. Ships were grounded on the shores of the island by the rough seas. Extensive defoliation and flooding occurred across northern Vanuatu. Water shortages and power outages began affecting Luganville, Espiritu Santo's largest city, prior to Harold's landfall. Heavy rainfall also threatened the contamination of Luganville's water supplies and washing out crops and roads, especially in low-lying areas. As the cyclone made landfall and moved through the city on April 6, the winds unroofed homes and downed trees. Some buildings were flattened by the storm, with one reduced to its foundation. Approximately 50–70 percent of buildings in the city were damaged; about half of homes suffered significant damage. Luganville Mayor Peter Patty stated “We are badly affected. We urgently need water, food and shelter at the moment. Many have lost their homes. Schools are destroyed. Electricity is down. I'm urgently calling for help. This is one of the worst experiences of my life.” following the storm. Further torrential rainfall flooded roadways. Luganville's municipal council building was destroyed. Communications with the city were disrupted as the storm swept through, and the city was further isolated from the rest of Espiritu Santo by floods, debris, and landslides. Mayor of the sister city to Luganville, Mont-Dore in New Caledonia, promised to help bring supplies and "exceptional assistance" to help Luganville recover from the devastating cyclone. Buildings were also destroyed across the rest of Sanma Province. Initial reports suggested severe damage was inflicted near Harold's point of landfall in the southwestern part of the province, with some areas experiencing damage to all structures. Shacks along the coast of Espiritu Santo were completely demolished, with some more developed homes unroofed and their walls ripped off or collapsed in. No building or structure was left unscathed in some communities on Malo Island. Two deaths were reported on the island, and many were said to have been injured. More extreme damage was reported in Pentecost, where the storm made its second landfall near peak intensity. Entire villages were reportedly destroyed. Further aerial damage surveys were issued to assess damage on the island. With the health facility Melsisi destroyed and staff housing damaged, the lower floor of another damaged building was used as a temporary medical ward. Damage wrought by Harold was said to have affected fewer areas than that of Cyclone Pam five years prior, but overall damage was deemed significantly worse in some areas, particularly Pentecost. 68% of all structures on Pentecost Island were estimated to have been damaged, while 45% were estimated to have been damaged on Malo Island. World Bank estimated the total damage of Harold reached US$617 million.

=== Fiji ===
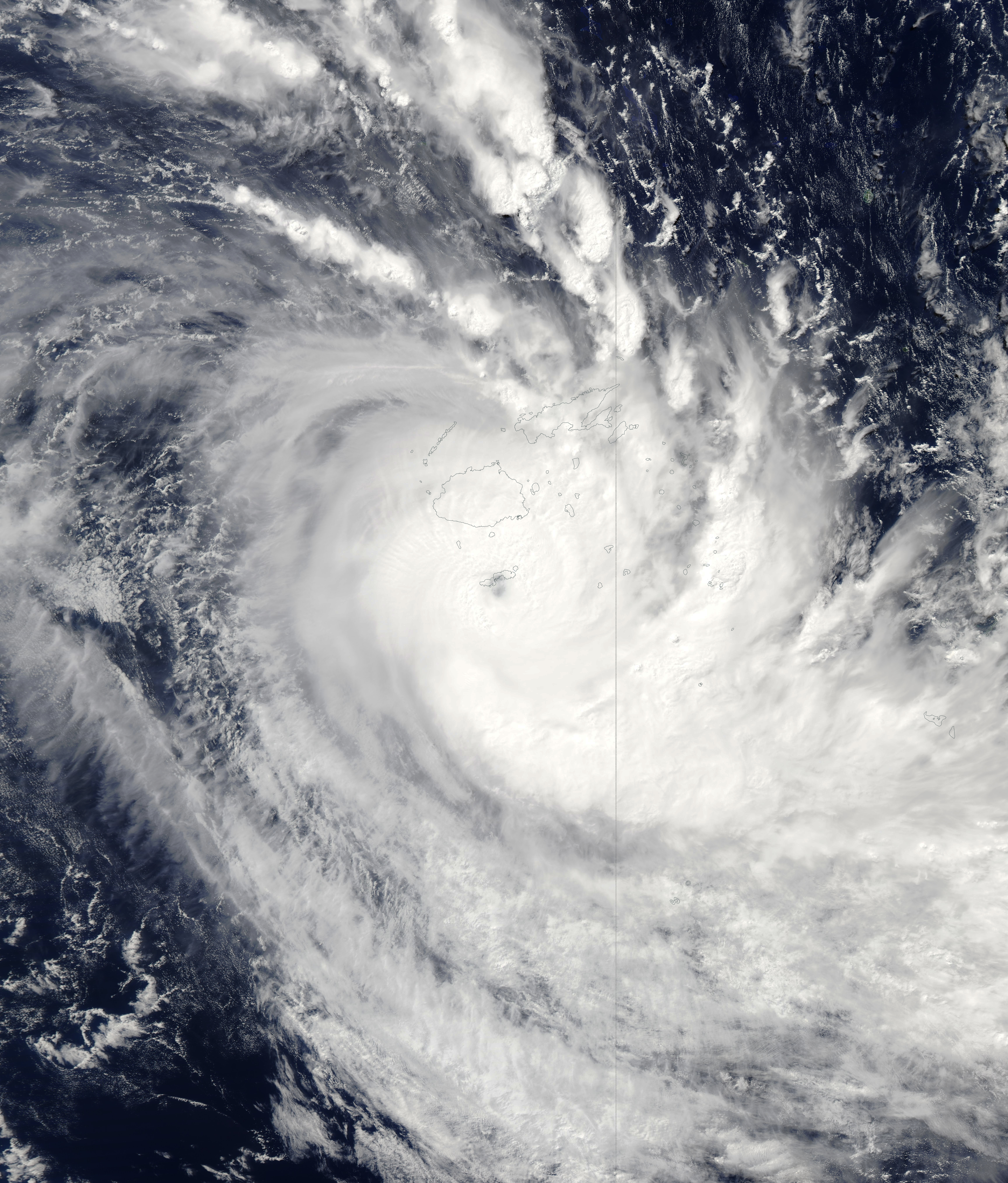
Harold moving across Kadavu on April 8

During April 6, the FMS issued a tropical cyclone alert for Viti Levu, Kadavu, Lomaiviti as well as the Yasawa and Mamanuca and Lau group of islands.

The FMS issued heavy rain alerts for the western half of Viti Levu, Kadavu, and the Mamanuca and Yasawa islands on April 6, anticipating the arrival of Harold's rainbands and its centre's eventual passage south of Fiji. Storm warnings were later put in effect for the areas under a heavy rain alert, in addition to the Lomaiviti Islands; the heavy rain alert was expanded to encompass the entirety of the Fijian islands. The highest warning, a hurricane warning, was issued for Kadavu and Ono-i-Lau on April 7. The Fiji National Disaster Management Office (FDNMO) activated their Emergency Operations Centre to streamline preparations and evacuations. Across Fiji, 25 evacuation centres were initially opened, with 22 in the Western Division and 3 in the Central Division; at least 2,146 people sought shelter in the centres. The number of shelters and evacuees increased during and after Harold's passage; over 6,000 people sought refuge at 197 evacuation centres, with at least two in each of Fiji's four districts. All village headmen and community leaders were directed to evacuate their people to safety. The Kadavu Provincial Council warned Kadavu residents to seek higher ground. Viti Levu was placed under a restriction of movement order on April 8, ensuring that only emergency services would be on the roads; this order was lifted later that day. The director of the Fijian Ministry of Fisheries, Mere Lakeba, advised aquaculture farmers to reduce water usage and boaters to move their vessels to safety. Maritime clearances were indefinitely terminated for all ships by the Maritime Safety Authority of Fiji, apart from evacuating ships. All Land Transport Authority offices were closed. Non-essential civil servants were directed to stay home. On April 7, Fiji Airways moved some of its larger aircraft to New Zealand to avoid storm damage. Fiji Airways flights carrying evacuees departed for Sydney and Los Angeles.

Costliest South Pacific Ocean tropical cyclones
Rank	Tropical cyclones	Season	Damage USD	Refs
1	3 Gabrielle	2022–23	$9.2 billion	
2	TD 06F	2022–23	$1.43 billion	
3	5 Winston	2015–16	$1.4 billion	
4	5 Harold	2019–20	$768 million	
5	5 Pam	2014–15	$543 million	
6	5 Judy and Kevin	2022–23	$433 million	
7	4 Val	1991–92	$381 million	
8	5 Lola	2023–24	$352 million	
9	4 Evan	2012–13	$313 million	
10	4 Gita	2017–18	$253 million	

Early on April 7, villagers in the Malolo and Yasawa groups began to feel some early effects from the storm, including gusty winds, moderate coastal flooding, and storm surge. The Turaga-ni-Koro (village chief) advised all villagers on Malolo to stay inside and remain alert at all times throughout the day. Heavy rainfall flooded several communities across Fiji; flash flood warnings covered all low-lying areas and watersheds throughout the country. Parts of Ba, Lautoka, and two villages were flooded. Patients in the main hospital in Lautoka were moved to the ground floor as a precautionary measure. Police checkpoints were established to restrict travel to Ba due to widespread floods along the Ba River and nearby creeks. Nearly a hundred homes in Qauia, Lami, were affected by flooding. Roads were blocked by fallen trees, floodwaters, and landslides. The Nasivi River overflowed its banks, submerging a highway and a bridge. Sections of Queens and Kings highways were closed due to obstructions. Nine houses were razed in Tailevu Province, injuring several people. Tailevu North College and homes in Tailevu lost parts of their roofs. Crops were uprooted from farms by the winds. In Nadi, winds reached 95 km/h (59 mph) and electricity was cut. Power outages stemming from downed power poles and lines affected much of Fiji's Central and Western divisions. Power company Energy Fiji Limited described the damage to its power lines as "significant". Houses in Sigatoka were damaged by strong winds and most parts of the city were left without power. A tornado struck Vusuya, Nausori on the morning of April 8, unroofing homes, uprooting trees, and felling power poles; fifteen houses were badly damaged and two people were injured. Seven houses and a school were unroofed by another tornado in Nakasi. Nine homes in Narere, Nasinu were damaged by a third tornado produced by Harold. Low-lying areas of Suva were inundated along the coastal waterfront. About ten homes in the city were destroyed. Metal and aluminum pipes from a skyscraper undergoing construction in Suva fell onto the adjacent roads and properties. Heavy rain and strong winds extended into the Northern Division, downing trees and signage. Cassava, plantain, and banana plantations sustained losses due to strong winds in Kubulau, Bua District. Communications were lost in the Kadavu and the Lau islands, where many buildings were damaged. Approximately 50 homes were destroyed in Ono-i-Lau, which was 63 km (39 mi) away from the center of Harold at its closest approach. Widespread damage was reported in Dravuni. Farms and crops were damaged in Vanuabalavu. In Bulia, Kadavu, around 20 homes were damaged, including newly built houses. In total, 26 people were injured across Fiji, and one died. Power remained yet to be restored for 80% of the affected homes by April 11, 3 days after the first impacts.

Damage caused by Harold in the agricultural and educational industry of Fiji totaled up to FJ$35.5 million (US$15.5 million). 1,919 buildings in Fiji were damaged by Harold and 575 were destroyed, mainly in the Eastern Division. The government estimated the total damage to be exceeding US$40 million.

=== Tonga ===
The Fua’amotu Tropical Cyclone Warning Centre in Tonga was activated on April 7 as Harold was forecast to track into Tongan waters within two days. Heavy rain warnings and flash flood advisories were issued for 'Eua, Ha'apai, Tongatapu, and Vava'u, with additional warnings for high winds covering the same areas in addition to other outlying islands. Commercial banks in Tonga closed on April 9, with normal operations expected to return on April 14. Police advised residents to seek shelter if necessary and to avoid Nuku'alofa's central business district. An extreme high tide warning, the highest level of tide warning possible in Tonga, was issued for Tonga's coastal waters as Harold approached, also coinciding with a king tide, which were predicted to cause possibly the highest tides near Tonga for 2020.

Power outages began affecting parts of Tonga due to falling trees caused by the storm on April 9. The center of Harold passed 90–100 km (56–62 mi) south of Tongatapu, lashing Tonga with heavy rains and wind; a peak gust of 80 km/h (50 mph) was registered at 'Eua Airport. Damage to food crops and water supplies occurred in 'Eua and Tongatapu. Storm surge, reaching 0.86 m (2 ft 10 in) above king tide, inundated coastal extents of Tongatapu, with their greatest impacts on the island's central and western shores. Three tourist resorts west of Nuku'alofa were destroyed; their beach-side cottages, events complexes, and residences were razed by the surge. Of the islands, 'Eua was most badly affected, with serious damage wrought to its wharf. Some houses were unroofed and electricity was lost throughout the island. Casualties were reported in the kingdom on April 10, although cut communications by the storm prevented confirmation of them. Farther inland, vegetation and crops were damaged by the storm. On April 23, Tonga's Minister of Finance revealed that the total Damages from Cyclone Harold in Tonga is estimated to in excess of US$111 million.

== Aftermath ==
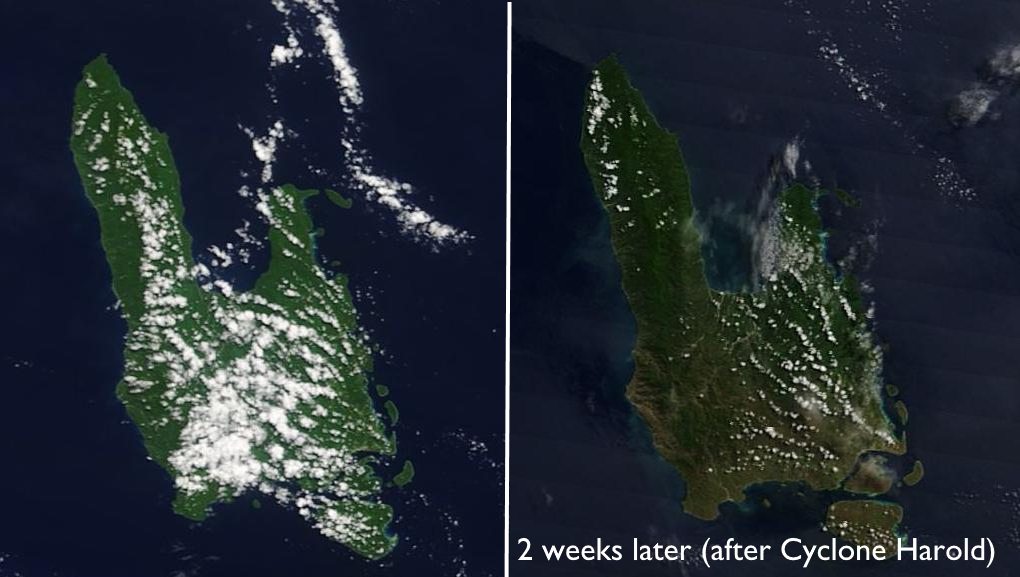
Espiritu Santo and Malo Island (left) 2 weeks before Harold, and the same islands (right) 2 weeks after Harold, showing heavy deforestation around the coasts with the previously lush landscape turning brown.

The state of emergency enacted for Vanuatu for the COVID-19 pandemic was extended to bolster the government response to Harold's aftermath. Recovery efforts were estimated to last 12 months, with the longetivity due in part to the concurrent coronavirus crisis. Oxfam Australia launched a disaster response team to assess and aid in repairing damage across Vanuatu's Sanma Province just hours after the first impacts from Harold, doubling down on COVID-19 aid as well. Save the Children prepared relief materials on the islands for distribution to affected children. The Vanuatu Red Cross Society was joined by Red Cross societies from Fiji and the Solomon Islands. Stockpiled emergency kits were distributed by the Vanuatu Catholic Church for those affected. Lisa Faerua, the country director for Oxfam, stated that recovery from the storm could take up to a year, which would likely be delayed as a result of the coronavirus pandemic. Relief supplies shipped to Vanuatu were required to be quarantined for seven days before distribution on the islands. A P-3 Orion surveillance plane was sent by the New Zealand Defence Force (NZDF) to determine where humanitarian assistance could be prioritized. An NZDF C-130 was assigned to deliver a helicopter to Vanuatu to support relief efforts and carry out medical supplies. New Zealand foreign minister Winston Peters funded US$485,000 (NZ$500,000) to the Government of Vanuatu to help aid recovery following the storm on April 8. Total direct contributions from New Zealand to Vanuatu amounted to US$1.52 million (NZ$2.5 million). Australia's assistance package to Vanuatu included logistical, health, education, and policing support for government and non-government agencies. An Australian Defence Force plane was sent to northern Vanuatu to send supplies to impacted areas on April 9. France sent tents, shelter kits, kitchen sets and jerry cans to the country under request of Vanuatu's government. World Vision Australia estimated around 160,000 people (a little less than half the country's population) were left homeless by the storm, and declared the cyclone as a Category II disaster on their disaster rating scale. They then pledged to donate US$4 million (NZ$6.5 million) worth of supplies to affected areas. The OCHA provided a US$2.5 million emergency fund to Vanuatu to help ease the crisis, while UN Humanitarian Chief Mark Lowcock stated that it was "especially important" to support Vanuatu at a time when the coronavirus pandemic "touches us all". The World Bank donated US$10 million in emergency funding to Vanuatu on April 27. Between April 25 and 27, the Vanuatu Ministry of Health reported a significant increase in dengue fever and malaria cases in Torba and Sanma provinces, believed to be related to the cyclone. The agricultural industry of Vanuatu was hit particularly hard, with at least 60% of agricultural lands hosting bananas and coconuts (which together bring in a large majority of the country's revenue) were severely damaged according to the FAO.

In Fiji, Fijian soldiers from the Republic of Fiji Military Forces Third Fiji Infantry and police were dispatched to clear debris following the storm. The Government of Australia pledged A$350,000 in aid to Fiji for Harold relief efforts. The High Commissioner of New Zealand to Fiji, Jonathan Curr, pledged humanitarian and disaster and relief for Fiji from New Zealand.

=== Retirement ===
In the 2020 Bureau of Meteorology meeting, the name Harold was retired after the severe deaths and damage that it caused in the South Pacific basin, and was replaced with Heath for future seasons.

== See also ==
- Cyclone Fran (1992) – Hit the same region at a similar intensity
- Cyclone Jasmine (2012) – Also named by the Australian region and struck southern Vanuatu
- Cyclone Pam (2015) – Affected a similar region, and also obtained a similar intensity
- Cyclone Hola (2018) – Struck northern Vanuatu
- Cyclone Winston (2016) – The strongest storm observed in the Southern Hemisphere on record, in modern history and also affected a similar region with record strength.
- Cyclone Yasa (2020) – One of the most powerful recorded storms to make landfall on Fiji
- Tropical cyclones in 2020
