= Pentecost (island) =

Island in Vanuatu

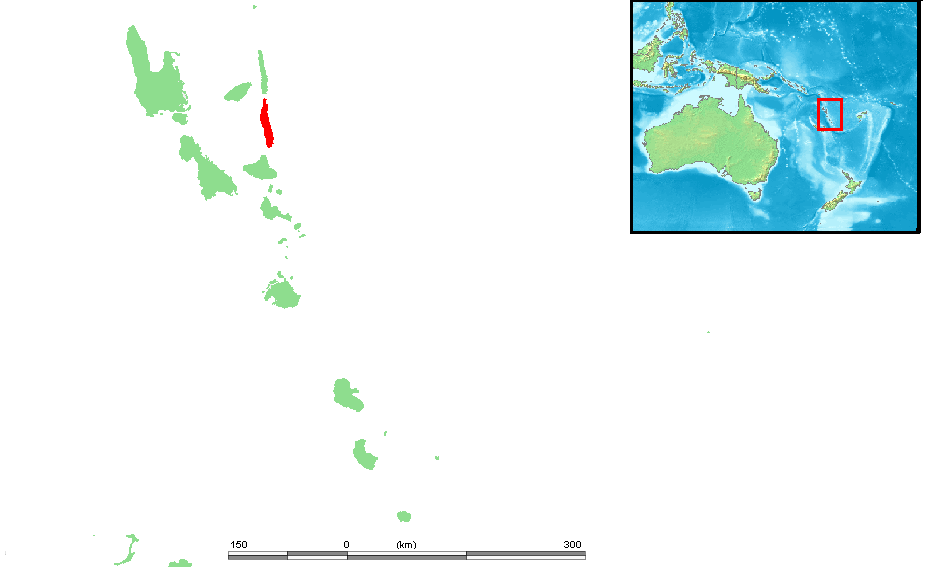
- Map of Pentecost

Geography
- Location: Pacific Ocean
- Coordinates: 15°45′38″S 168°11′23″E
- Archipelago: New Hebrides
- Area: 490 km^{2} (190 sq mi)
- Highest elevation: 947 m (3107 ft)

Administration
- Vanuatu
- Province: Penama

Demographics
- Population: 16,843 (2009)
- Ethnic groups: Ni-Vanuatu

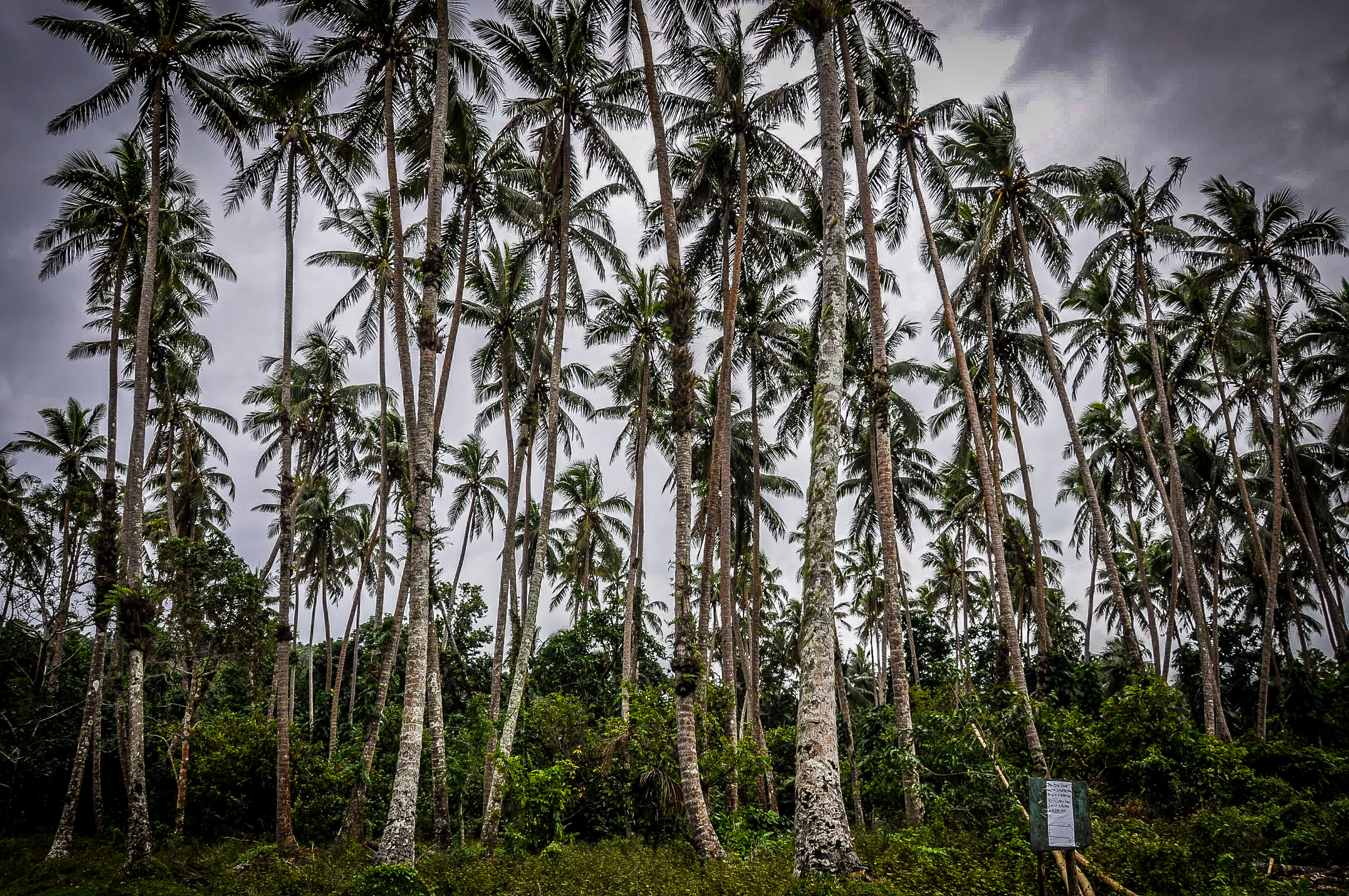
Palm trees on the island of Pentecost, Vanuatu

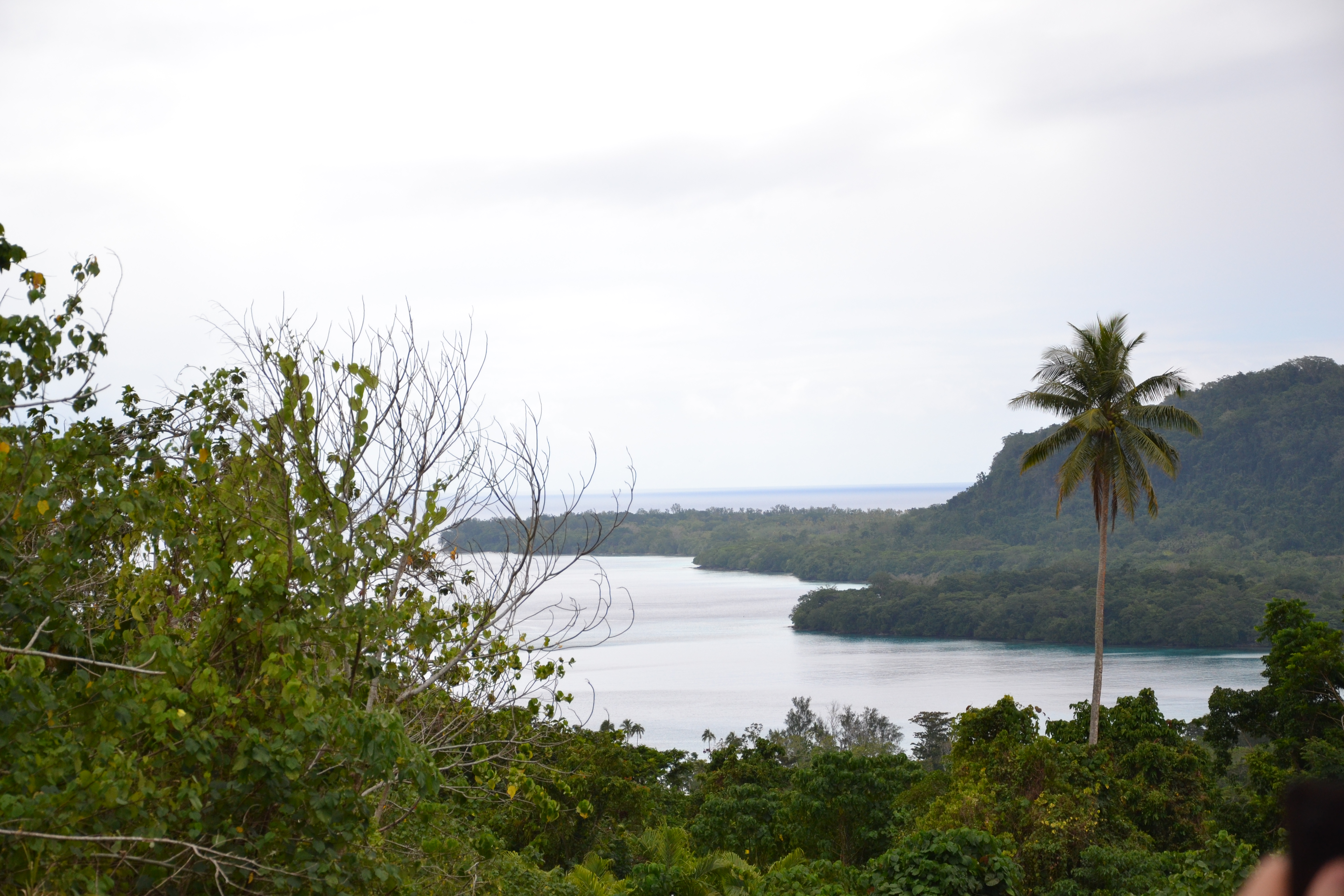
The island of Pentecost

Pentecost is one of the 83 islands that make up the South Pacific nation of Vanuatu.

It lies 190 kilometres (120 mi) due north of capital Port Vila. Pentecost is known as Pentecôte in French and Pentekos in Bislama. The island was known in its native languages by names such as Vanu Aroaroa, although these names are not in common use today. Pentecost has also been referred to as Raga or Araga, a tribal name that originated in the north but is now widely applied to the whole island. In old sources, it is occasionally referred to as Whitsuntide Island.

== Geography ==
Pentecost is a lush, mountainous island which stretches north to south over some 60 kilometres (37 mi). It has an area of 490 square kilometres (190 sq mi). The mountain range, of which the highest is Mount Vulmat (947 metres, 3,107 ft), marks the dividing line between the humid, rainy eastern coast and the more temperate western coast. The coastal plains, cross-cut by small torrents, are generally very green and ideally suited for plantations and livestock.

The climate on Pentecost is humid tropical. The average annual rainfall is about 3,500 mm of rain. There are two seasons in the year: the rainy season, which lasts from November to April, and the dry season, which lasts from May to October. The island is subject to frequent cyclones and earthquakes.

== History and customs ==
Some Bule people of Pentecost trace their origins to Nuenue, a woman to whom was given the skill of weaving by the creator, Tagaro. She travelled throughout the island, passing on the skill to others, and, in exchange, she was given land. As a result, the descendants of Nuenue are entitled to land wherever Nuenue settled.

The first Western sighting of Pentecost was by the Spanish expedition of Pedro Fernandez de Quiros in April 1606. Pentecost was again sighted on the day of Pentecost, 22 May 1768, by Louis Antoine de Bougainville. It was also sighted by Captain James Cook, during his voyage through the New Hebrides (now Vanuatu) in 1774. It was influenced by successive Christian missionaries but traditional customs there remain strong.

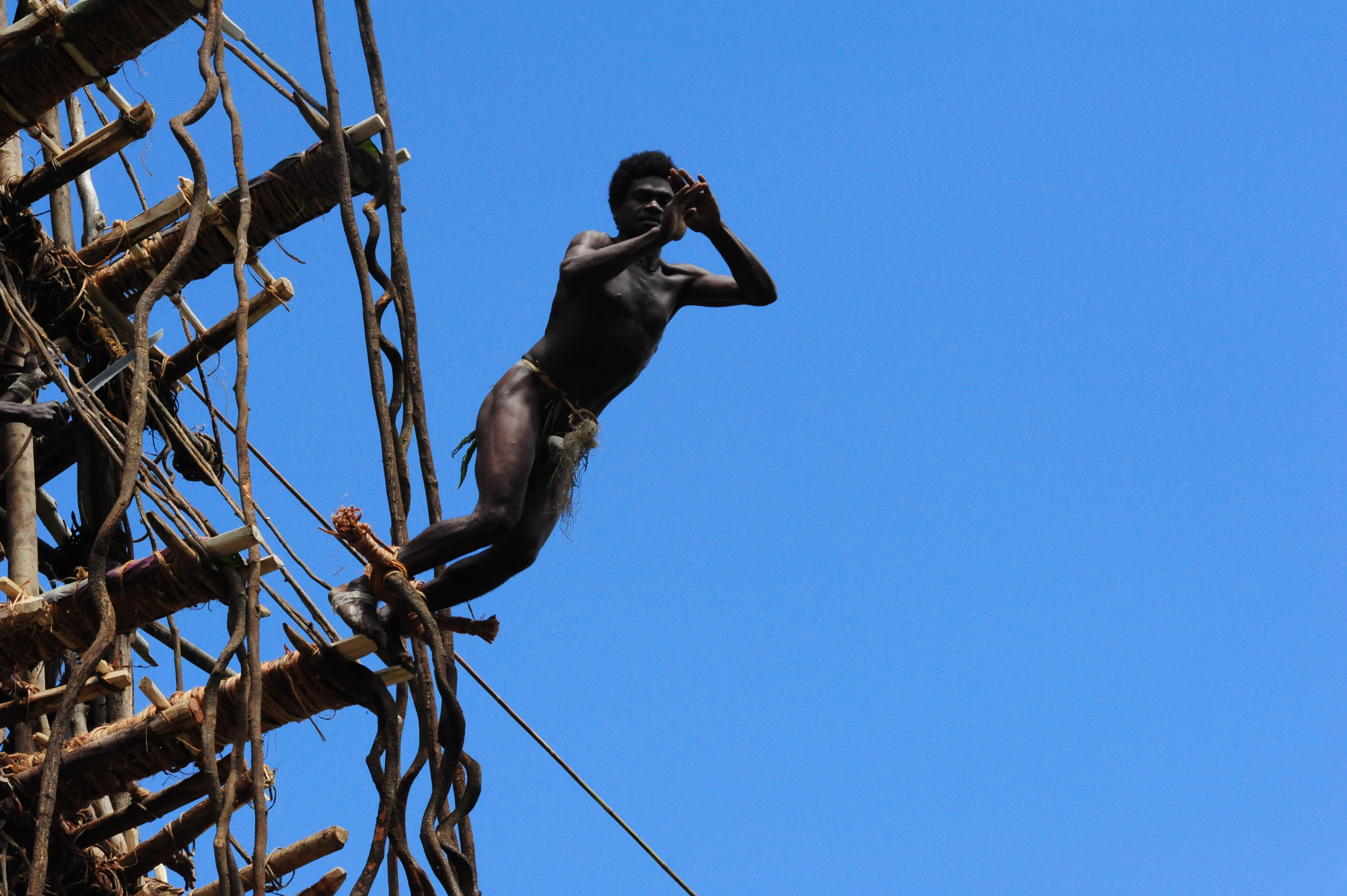
Land diving

Pentecost is most famous for being the spiritual birthplace of the extreme sport of bungee jumping, originating in an ages old ritual called the Gol (Bislama nanggol), or land diving. Between April and June every year, men in the southern part of the island jump from tall towers (around 20 to 30 metres, 70 to 100 ft) with vines tied to their feet, in a ritual believed to ensure a good yam harvest. The ritual is also now used to show acceptance into manhood. Land diving was first given international exposure when David Attenborough and a BBC film crew brought back footage of the ritual during the 1950s, which aired as part of The People of Paradise documentary series. Visitors to Pentecost who witnessed the ceremony include Pope John Paul II (1986) and Queen Elizabeth II (1974).

The north Pentecost village of Laone was the home of Walter Lini, who led Vanuatu to independence in 1980. Today, the 'father of the nation' is commemorated by a statue at the nearby Lini Memorial College.

The Turaga indigenous movement, which rejects the Western economic system and instead promotes an alternative based on the "kastom economy", began on Pentecost and is based at Lavatmanggemu in the north-east of the island.

The practice of grade-taking (the elevation of social status through the slaughter of valuable pigs) has been studied by anthropologists.

== Population ==
Traditionally, two tribes occupied Pentecost, the Tabi and the Bule, who intermarry and follow a matrilineal system of descent and inheritance. The island has a population of almost 17,000 at the 2009 census. Pentecost's population centres are concentrated along the west coast, although a number of people also live inland. Major settlements along the west coast include (from north to south): Laone, Abwatuntora, Loltong, Latano, Nambwarangiut, Namaram, Bwatnapni, Melsisi, Ranwadi, Waterfall (Vanuu), Baravet, Lonoror, Hotwata, Panas, Wali, Panngi and Ranputor. Away from the coast, there are major settlements at Nazareth and Atavtabangga in the north, and at Enaa, Wutsunmwel, Tanbok, Naruwa, Ubiku and Tansip in the centre of the island. Most of these places have village telephones and one or two inhabitants who own 'trucks' (four-wheel-drive vehicles) or 'speedboats' (small motorboats), which the villagers use for transport. A couple of these villages also have small banks and post offices.

The east coast is wild and inaccessible, with large uninhabited areas, although people are moving into previously uninhabited areas as the island's population increases. Major villages on the eastern side of the island include Ranwas, Bunlap and Baie Barrier (Ranon) in the south-east, and Renbura and Vanrasini further north.

== Lifestyle and economy ==
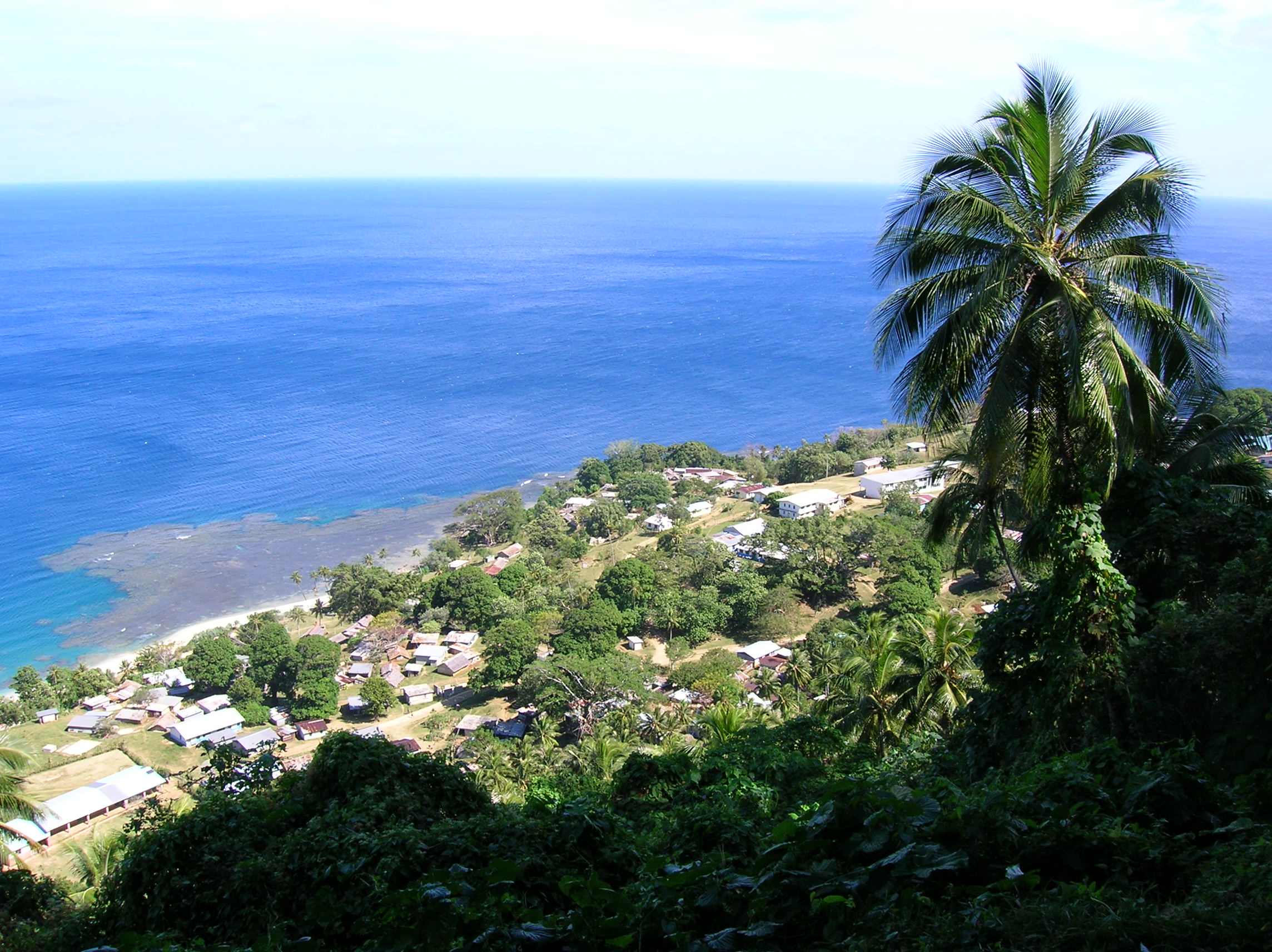
The village of Melsisi on Pentecost

There are no real towns on Pentecost. Most islanders live in small rural villages, surviving by subsistence agriculture and growing cash crops. Taro, a root vegetable well-suited to Pentecost's wet climate, is the staple food. Manioc (cassava), yams, bananas, kumala (sweet potato), coconuts, island cabbage, pawpaw (papaya), nakavika (rose apples), citrus, sugar cane, cacao, mangoes, pineapples, nuts, and European vegetables are also grown for local consumption.

Vegetables are often grated into a paste, wrapped in large leaves, baked in an earthen oven and covered with coconut cream to create 'laplap', a savoury pudding.

Pigs are highly important in Pentecost society, not only as food but as a traditional item of value, which may be given as payment during marriage ceremonies or as compensation for transgressions. Boars with long, curved tusks are particularly prized. Woven, red-dyed mats are also used as a traditional form of currency.

Traditionally, copra (dried coconut meat) was Pentecost's main export, but this has now been overtaken by kava, a narcotic root used to prepare a traditional drink. Kava is grown and drunk on many islands in the South Pacific, but Pentecost is particularly well known for it, and much of the kava drunk in Vanuatu's towns and abroad originates on Pentecost.

Cattle were once exported from Pentecost to the meat-processing factory at Luganville on neighbouring Santo island. However, most are now slaughtered locally instead, to feed Pentecost's growing population.

Houses are traditionally constructed from local wood and bamboo, and thatched with leaves of natanggura (a variety of palm). However, wealthier islanders now build their houses instead using imported cement and corrugated metal.

== Transport and communications ==
Pentecost has two airports, Lonorore Airport in the south-west and Sara Airport in the north, at which small airplanes land two or three times a week. Lonorore was upgraded in 2008–2009 with a new tarmacked airstrip capable of handling larger aircraft and operating in wet conditions; Sara remains a short grass airstrip.

Cargo ships travelling between Port Vila and Luganville supply the island's west coast, although few ships visit the east coast, where sea conditions are rough and the population is sparse.

A rutted dirt road runs from the north to the southwest of the island, and another road connects Salap in the southwest to Ranwas in the southeast. However, many villages are accessible only by steep mountain footpaths.

Pentecost receives regular visits from yachts, who anchor at the villages of Loltong, Waterfall and Panngi. Panngi also has a jetty capable of receiving cruise ships, which make occasional visits during the land-diving season.

== Language ==
Pentecost has five indigenous languages, all from the North Vanuatu sub-branch of the Southern Oceanic languages: Raga (North Pentecost language), Apma (Central Pentecost language), Sowa (a recently extinct language of south-central Pentecost), Ske (a small and endangered language of south-western Pentecost), and Sa (South Pentecost language). Apma and Sa have multiple dialects.

In addition, most people on Pentecost speak Bislama, the form of pidgin English that is Vanuatu's national language, and the island's native languages are becoming increasingly mixed with Bislama words and expressions. Educated islanders also know English or French, which are taught in schools.

The Turaga nation uses the Avoiuli writing system, created as a native alternative to the Latin alphabet. It is based on designs found in traditional sand drawings, and is used mainly for writing in the native Raga language.

== See also ==
- Motarilavoa Hilda Lin̄i
- Bungee jumping
- Turaga nation
