= Apma language =

Austronesian language spoken in Vanuatu

Apma
- Native to: Vanuatu
- Region: Pentecost Island
- Native speakers: (7,800 cited 2001)
- Language family: Austronesian: Malayo-Polynesian; Oceanic; Southern Oceanic; North-Central Vanuatu; Central Vanuatu; Apma
- Writing system: Latin, Avoiuli

Language codes
- ISO 639-3: app
- Glottolog: apma1240
- Apma is not endangered according to the classification system of the UNESCO Atlas of the World's Languages in Danger

Apma (or Abma or Central Raga) is the language of central Pentecost island in Vanuatu. Apma is an Oceanic language (a branch of the Austronesian language family). Within Vanuatu it sits between North Vanuatu and Central Vanuatu languages, and combines features of both groups.

With an estimated 7,800 native speakers (in the year 2000), Apma is the most widely spoken of Pentecost's native languages, and the fifth largest vernacular in Vanuatu as a whole. In recent times Apma has spread at the expense of other indigenous languages such as Sowa and Ske. Apma is increasingly mixed with words and expressions from Bislama, Vanuatu's national language.

== Name of the language ==
Like Pentecost's other languages, Apma is named after the local word for "what" or "something". Locally it is usually referred to simply as dalekte "language" or daleda "our language". Many people from other areas of Vanuatu recognise the language by the catchphrase te gabis meaning "good" or "OK", or refer informally to its speakers as wakin, an Apma term of address for brothers or friends.

Some linguists treat the Apma sound p as an allophone of b, and thus write the language's name as Abma. However, this interpretation of the language's phonology is disputed, and locally Apma is the preferred spelling.

== Dialects and range ==
Modern Apma has three well-defined dialects:

- Suru Mwerani, the southernmost dialect, is the most widely spoken and well-documented dialect. It is spoken in Melsisi, Tansip, Vanrasini and surrounding villages, and in the former Sowa area between Melsisi and Ranmawot.
- Suru Rabwanga (or Suru Bo), the central dialect, is spoken in the mountainous area between Bwatnapni and Namaram. It is very similar to Suru Mwerani, and the two dialects are mixed in villages such as Bwatnapni, Enaa, Wutsunmwel and Naruwa.
- Suru Kavian is a small, endangered and very distinctive dialect, spoken in the area to the north and east of Namaram. It is hard for speakers of the other two dialects to understand.

Mwerani and rabwanga are the words for "today" in their respective dialects, while bo and kavi are the words for "pig".

Two other probable Apma dialects, Asuk (or Asa) in the south-west and Wolwolan (or Volvoluana) in the north, are now extinct.

== Phonology ==
The vowels of Apma are:

	Front		Central	Back
High	i iː	yː		u uː
Mid	e eː			o oː
Low			a aː	

The consonants in Apma are:

		Bilabial	Labio- velar	Alveolar	Velar	Glottal
Nasal		m	mʷ	n	ŋ	
Plosive	voiced	b	bʷ	d	ɡ	
Plosive	voiceless	(p)		t	k	
Affricate				ts		
Fricative		β		s		h
Flap				ɾ		
Approximant			w	l		

The consonant phonemes of Apma are b, d, g, h, k, l, m, n, ng (as in English "singer"), r, s, t, ts (or j), bilabial v, w, and labiovelar bw and mw. The consonants v and w are realised as p where they occur at the end of a syllable; b may also be devoiced to p when next to an unvoiced consonant, as in -tpo "lie down".

Clusters of consonants cannot occur within a syllable. Unlike in the closely related Raga language, word roots in Apma can end with a consonant.

In archaic and northern varieties of Apma, prenasalization of consonants occurs in some environments, so that b becomes mb, d becomes nd, and g becomes ngg. This feature has been lost in modern Suru Mwerani dialect.

Apma's five vowels come in short forms (a, e, i, o and u) and long forms (aa, ee, ii, oo and uu). Long vowels typically occur where a consonant (most commonly r) has historically been lost. Vowels can occur alone or in various combinations. A few words (e.g. miu "wild cane") contain a distinctive rounded high-front vowel, generally written as iu although perceived by speakers simply as a variant of u.

Stress is normally on the penultimate syllable of a word. However, syllables that end with a consonant or a long vowel take stress in precedence to other syllables.

== Grammar ==
Basic word order in Apma is subject–verb–object. Occasionally, a subject may occur out of its usual position, in which case it is marked with na:

Bo mwe gani bwarus = The pig is eating papaya
Mwe gani bwarus, na bo = It's eating papaya, the pig

=== Pronouns ===
Personal pronouns are distinguished by person and number. They are not distinguished by gender. The basic pronouns differ substantially between dialects:

Person	Apma (Suru Mwerani dialect)	Apma (Suru Rabwanga dialect)	Apma (Suru Kavian dialect)	English
1st person singular	nana	nana	ina	"me"
2nd person singular	kik	^{ng}gi	(ku)^{ng}gu	"you" (singular)
3rd person singular	ni	ni	ini	"him / her / it"
1st person dual (inclusive)	kuduru	ku^{n}duru	ki^{n}diri	"us" (you and me, two of us)
1st person dual (exclusive)	gemaru	^{ng}gemaru	i^{ng}gari	"us" (me and another)
2nd person dual	gumru	^{ng}gimiru	^{ng}gumiri	"you (two)"
3rd person dual	nuuru	nuuru	iniiri	"them (two)"
1st person plural (inclusive)	kidi	ki^{n}di	ki^{n}di	"us" (you and me)
1st person plural (exclusive)	gema	^{ng}gema	i^{ng}ga	"us" (me and others)
2nd person plural	gimi	^{ng}gimi	^{ng}gumi	"you" (plural)
3rd person plural	nii	nii	inii	"them"

The dual or plural form of "you" is occasionally used in place of the singular form to show extreme respect.

=== Nouns ===
Nouns in Apma are generally not preceded by articles. Plurality is indicated by placing the pronoun nii ("them") or a number after the noun:

bwihil = [the] bird
bwihil nii = [the] birds
bwihil katsil = three birds

Nouns may be either free, or directly possessed. Directly possessed nouns are suffixed to indicate whom an item belongs to. For example:

dalek = my voice
dalem = your voice
dalen = his/her voice
dalen subu = the chief's voice
dalekte = voice (generic)

Possession may also be indicated by the use of possessive classifiers, separate words that occur before or after the noun and take possessive suffixes. These classifiers are:

- no- for general possessions (nok watang, "my basket")
- bila- for things that are cared for, such as crops and livestock (bilada bo, "our pig")
- ka- for things to be eaten (kam tsi, "your sugarcane")
- ma- for things to be drunk (maa sileng, "their water")
- na- for associations, over which the possessor has no control (vini nak, "my home island")

The possessive suffixes are as follows:

Person	Apma (Suru Mwerani dialect)	Apma (Suru Rabwanga dialect)	Apma (Suru Kavian dialect)	English
1st person singular	-k	-^{ng}g + vowel	-^{ng}g + vowel	"of mine"
2nd person singular	-m	-m	-m	"of yours" (singular)
3rd person singular	-n	-n	-n	"of his/hers/its"
1st person dual (inclusive)	-daru	-^{n}d + vowel + ru	-^{n}d + vowel + ri	"of ours" (yours and mine, two of us)
1st person dual (exclusive)	-maru	-maru	-mari	"of ours" (mine and another's)
2nd person dual	-mru	-muru	-miri	"of yours" (two of you)
3rd person dual	lengthened vowel + -ru	lengthened vowel + -ru	lengthened vowel + -ri	"of theirs" (two of them)
1st person plural (inclusive)	-da	-^{n}d + vowel	-^{n}d + vowel	"of ours" (yours and mine)
1st person plural (exclusive)	-ma	-ma	-ma	"of ours" (mine and others')
2nd person plural	-mi	-mi	-mi	"of yours" (plural)
3rd person plural	lengthened vowel	lengthened vowel	lengthened vowel	"of theirs"
Generic	-kte	-k	-k	-

In Suru Kavian dialect, vowels in certain directly possessed nouns and possessive classifiers change according to the pattern illustrated below. This does not occur in other dialects:

1st person singular	no^{ng}go bu "my knife"	vilu^{ng}gu "my hair"
2nd person singular	nom bu "your knife"	vilum "your hair"
3rd person singular	nen bu "his/her knife"	vilin "his/her hair"
1st person plural (inclusive)	ne^{n}de bu "our knife"	vili^{n}di "our hair"
1st person plural (exclusive)	noma bu "our knife"	viluma "our hair"
2nd person singular	nomi bu "your knife"	vilumi "your hair"
3rd person singular	nee bu "their knife"	vilii "their hair"

A verb may be transformed into a noun by the addition of a nominalising suffix -an:

wel = to dance (verb)
welan = a dance (noun)

Modifiers generally come after a noun, although those derived from nouns may come before:

vet = stone
vet kavet = four stones
vet kau = big stone
biri vet = small stone (biri "small" comes from the noun "seed")

=== Verbs ===
Verbs in Apma are usually preceded by a subject pronoun and by a marker indicating the tense, aspect and mood of the action.

The subject pronouns are as follows:

Person	Apma	English
1st person singular	na-	"I"
2nd person singular	ko-	"you" (singular)
3rd person singular	-	"he" / "she" / "it"
1st person plural (inclusive)	ta-	"we" (you and I)
1st person plural (exclusive)	kaa(ma)-	"we" (others and I)
2nd person plural	ka- (ko… i in Suru Kavian dialect)	"you" (plural)
3rd person plural	ra-	"they"

Apma has the following tense/aspect/mood markers:

Tense / Aspect / Mood	Used for	Marker (full form)	Marker (short form)
Imperfective	Actions in the present tense Temporary or changing states A 'default' marker when the tense/aspect/mood has already been set	mwa-, mwe-, mwi-, mwo-, mu-	-m
Perfective	Actions in the past tense Fixed states Negative phrases in either past or present tense	te-	-t
Potential	Things that may happen in the future	mwan(e)- (northern dialects: nee-)	-n (northern dialects: lengthened vowel)
Prospective	Things that are about to happen	nema- (northern dialects: nene-)	-ma (northern dialects: lengthened vowel + -na)
Hypothetical	Things that have not happened and probably won't	bat(e)-	-bat
Imperative	Direct instructions Other actions that the speaker would like to initiate	ne-	(none)
Apprehensive	Bad things that might happen	ba-	ba-

The full forms of these markers are used in the 3rd person singular (where there is no subject pronoun):

mwe leli = he does it
te leli = he did it
mwan leli = he will do it
nema leli = he's going to do it
bat leli = he should do it
ne leli = let him do it
ba leli = he's in danger of doing it

Elsewhere, short forms of these markers are suffixed to the subject pronoun:

nam leli = I do it
nat leli = I did it
nan leli = I will do it
nama leli = I'm going to do it
nabat leli = I should do it
na leli = let me do it
naba leli = I'm in danger of doing it

The imperfective marker alters to some extent to match the sound of the verb it is attached to. It is usually absent altogether when the verb begins with b or bw. (In Suru Kavian dialect, it is absent when the verb begins with any consonant other than r.) For example, in Suru Mwerani:

mwi sip = he goes down
mwo rop = he runs
mu rus = he moves
--- ban = he goes

Dual (two-person) forms consist of the plural forms with ru (or ri in Suru Kavian) inserted after the tense/aspect/mood marker:

ram leli = they do it
ramru leli = the two of them do it

There is a pattern of verb-consonant mutation whereby v at the start of a verb changes to b, and w changes to bw, in certain aspects/moods:

nat van = I went
na ban = I am going
nan ban or nan van = I will go

In northern and archaic varieties of Apma, there is also mutation of k to g, and of t to d.

Particles that can occur in a verb phrase include:

- a minimizing marker ga(m), "just"
- a partitive marker te, "partly" or "at all"
- an additive marker m(u), "furthermore"
- a completive marker, also te, "already"

The direct object, if one is present, immediately follows the verb. When the object is inanimate and already known, it need not be stated explicitly:

nat gita kik = I saw you
nat gita = I saw [it]

The passive voice can be formed by attaching the suffix -an to the verb:

te lelian = it was done

When giving instructions, verbs are preceded simply by the 2nd person subject pronoun ko or karu "you":

Ko leli! = Do it! (to one person)
Karu leli! = Do it! (to two people, or politely to a group)
Ka leli! = Do it! (plural, considered impolite and usually heard only with children)

Many verbs in Apma have distinct transitive and intransitive forms. (These distinctions have been lost to some extent in Suru Kavian dialect.) For example, in Suru Mwerani:

Intransitive	Transitive
gan "to eat"	gani "to eat something"
min "to drink"	-mni "to drink something"
solsol "to do the sewing"	-slo "to sew something"
lehlehvik "to do the washing"	lehvi "to wash something"
diptsipmik "to perform a burial"	dipmi "to bury something"

In Suru Mwerani dialect, and to a lesser extent Suru Rabwanga, vowels have been lost from a number of verb roots, producing 'bound verbs' which begin with a pair of consonants (such as -mni and -slo above). Since clusters of consonants within a syllable are prohibited in Apma, speakers usually cite these verbs with a prefix such as mwa- attached (mwamni, mwaslo), and do not identify them as words when unprefixed.

In addition to verbs denoting actions, Apma has a large number of stative verbs that describe an item. For example, there is a verb "to be red" (meme) and a verb "to be good" (gabis). Apma uses stative verbs in many of the situations where adjectives would be used in English.

Unlike neighbouring Raga language, Apma has a copular verb, (v)i or bi. The phrase tei… meaning "it was…" (tevi… in Suru Kavian) is commonly used to focus attention on something or to set the scene.

Verbs in Apma can be linked together in a variety of serial verb constructions.

=== Negation ===
Negation is marked by the discontinuous morpheme ba…nga. The ba always occurs before the verb and the nga occurs after the verb or after the direct object should one occur as seen in (1) (Note: p.161.) where 'step' is the verb and 'breadfruit branch' the direct object. In the absence of a direct object the verb alone sits within the morpheme as seen in.

Ba, te=ba sab rotvi ra-n beta= nga.
COMM 3SG.PFV=NEG1 step break branch-3SG.POSS breadfruit= NEG2
'But he didn't break the branch of the breadfruit tree.'

A derivative of the common negative morpheme exists to indicate in-completion. Bado… ngamwa means 'not yet' and codes for the verb not being completed, with expectation that completion of the verb will eventually occur as seen in (2). (Note: p. 116.) Here, the -do in bado codes for 'yet' as does the -mwa in ngamwa. In comparison, (3) (Note: p. 258.) indicates that the subject of the sentence is 'not very good', leaving no room for further completion. Bado…ngamwa is not used in this examples but provides evidence of how the sentence is effected by in-completion. Also to be noted is that in both examples a word for 'be.good' is included but in (2) it occurs once while it occurs twice in (3). This could indicate that mnok or another action verb takes the place of one of the ''be.good''s in (3).

Ba ihgo nehu mwe=gae, ba ilil na-n ah te bado=mnok luhmwi ngamwa.
but when say 3SG.IPFV=be.elastic COMM sign ASSOC-3SG.POSS REL 3SG.PFV not.yet=be.finished be.good not.yet
'But when it's elastic, that's a sign that it's not ready yet.'

ba te=ba gabis dihi=nga.
COMM 3SG.PFV=NEG1 be.good be.good=NEG2
'It's not very good.'

==== Non-Verbal Sentences ====
The inclusion of a negative marker transforms a sentence from non-verbal to verbal, as such, non-verbal negative sentences do not exist in Apma. In order to successfully indicate negation, some form of the copular verb bibi, meaning 'be', must be inserted within the morpheme, otherwise nothing would occur within the discontinued morpheme. In (4), (Note: p.126.) the copular verb bibi is in the third person singular form and occurs before the partitive te and the verb.

[Atsi] [ra=t ba=i=te hal kau=nga], li vini ah Sanial.
someone 3PL=PFV NEG1=be=PART road big=NEG2 LOC village APP Sanial.
'There are not a lot of people in the village of Sanial.'

==== Irrealis Events and Hypotheticals ====
If an event is unlikely to occur, the irrealis modality marker mwan occurs before the negation morpheme as seen in (5). (Note: p. 178.)

Ihgo mwan=uus ba mwan ba=bma te=nga.
if 3SG.IRR=rain COMM 3SG.IRR NEG1=come PART=NEG2
'If it rains, then he won't come.'

Although a hypothetical can be classed as an irrealis event, the conventions differ very slightly. In a hypothetical situation bat precedes the negation morpheme as seen in (6). (Note: p.181.) Here, the hypothetical marker indicates that the new word for "bwala kul" did not exist in the past therefore, if it had been used, it could not have been recognised.

Niah mwate, ba ko bat=ba wutihi "bwala kul"=nga.
REL before COMM 2SG HYP=NEG1 find shell coconut=NEG2
'Whereas before, you wouldn't be able to find "bwala kul".'

==== Prohibitive ====
The prohibitive refers to the negation of an imperative as seen in (7) and is marked with the discontinuous prohibitive marker ba…an that functions similarly to the negation marker. The verb is enclosed in the morpheme and there is no direct object. Prohibitives are largely intransitive, thus the object is implied as seen in (8) where the food being eaten is not mentioned by the speaker but is still understood by interlocutors. It could be that because the focus is on the act of eating rather than what is specifically being eaten, the inclusion of a direct object would only distract from the emphatic nature of the imperative.

Te in its partitive form almost always precedes the an in a prohibitive sentence as seen in (8). (Note: p.170.) The partitive is used to create emphasis, which is a defining characteristic of imperatives. Although there are examples of prohibitives without te, they do not occur in natural discourse.

Ko=ba deng=an.
2SG.IMP=NEG1 cry-PRHB
'Don't cry.'

Ko=n=ba gan te=an, igo bila-n Butsungos.
2SG.=IRR=NEG1 eat PART=PRHB because CL.RS-3SG.POSS Butsungos.
'Don't you eat (it), because it belongs to Butsungos.'

== Vocabulary ==
=== Sample phrases ===
English	Apma (Suru Mwerani dialect)	Apma (Suru Rabwanga dialect)	Apma (Suru Kavian dialect)
Where are you going?	Ko ban ibeh?	Ko ban i^{m}beh?	Ko ban al beh?
I'm going to…	Na ban…	Na ^{m}ban…	Na ^{m}ban…
Where have you come from?	Ko tepma ibeh?	Ko tepma i^{m}beh?	Kot vama al beh?
I've come from…	Na tepma…	Na tepma…	Nat vama…
Where is it?	Mwidi ibeh?	Mwi^{n}di ibeh?	Si al beh?
It's here	Mwidi dokah	Mwi^{n}di dokah	Si i^{n}da
What's your name?	Ham ah itan?	Ham ah idan?	Am ah idan?
My name is…	Hak ah…	Ha^{ng}ga ah…	A^{ng}ga ah…
Where are you from?	Kik atsi at ibeh?	^{ng}Gi atsi at ibeh?	^{ng}Gu asi at beh?
I am from…	Nana atsi at…	Nana atsi at…	Ina asi at…
How much? / How many?	Kavih?	Kavih?	Kaivih?
one	bwaleh	bwaleh	bwaleh
two	karu	karu	kairi
three	katsil	katsil	kaitil
four	kavet	kavet	kaivas
five	kalim	kalim	kailim
Thank you	Ko biah	Ko bivah	Ko mudak
It's just fine	Te gabis nge	Te kabis nge	Te kabis nga

=== Notable Apma words ===
Boroguu, the name of a popular kava variety, comes from Apma.

== Documentation ==
Notes on the grammar and vocabulary of Apma language were first made by Catholic missionaries at Melsisii in the early 20th century.

Cindy Schneider of the University of New England completed a grammar and short dictionary of the Suru Mwerani dialect of Apma language in the late 2000s. Building on Schneider's work, Pascal Temwakon and Andrew Gray produced Bongmehee, an illustrated dictionary of the language.

The other two dialects of Apma remain poorly documented.

== Abbreviations ==
Abbreviations used in examples are taken from Cindy Schneider's description. (Note: pp.xix–xxi.)

Abbreviation	Meaning
2	second person
3	third person
APP	appositive
ASSOC	associative construction
CL.RS	natural resource classifier
COMM	comment marker (in a topic-comment structure)
HYP	hypothetical
IMP	imperative
IPFV	imperfective
IRR	irrealis
LOC	locative
NEG1	first part of discontinuous negative morpheme
NEG2	second part of discontinuous negative morpheme
PART	partitive
PFV	perfective
PL	plural
POSS	possessive
PRHB	prohibitive
REL	relative clause marker
SG	singular
.	divides components of a portmanteau morpheme, syllable boundary
-	morpheme boundary (affix)
=	morpheme boundary (clitic)
[ ]	constituent
( )	optional element

== Bibliography ==
- Crowley, Terry (2000). "The language situation in Vanuatu". Current Issues in Language Planning. 1 (1): 47–132. doi:10.1080/14664200008668005. S2CID 144268250.
- Gray, Andrew (2013). The Languages of Pentecost Island. British Friends of Vanuatu Society.
- Lynch, John; Crowley, Terry (2001). Languages of Vanuatu: A New Survey and Bibliography. Pacific Linguistics. Canberra: Australian National University. doi:10.15144/PL-517. ISBN 0-85883-469-3.
- Schneider, Cynthia (2010). A grammar of Abma: a language of Pentecost Island, Vanuatu. Canberra: Pacific Linguistics. ISBN 9780858836075.
- Temwakon, Pascal; Gray, Andrew (2008). Bongmehee: A dictionary of Apma language (PDF). Archived from the original (PDF) on 2023-08-12.
- Tryon, Darrell (1976). New Hebrides Languages: An Internal Classification. Pacific Linguistics. ISBN 9780858831520.
