= Lonorore Airport =

Airport in Vanuatu

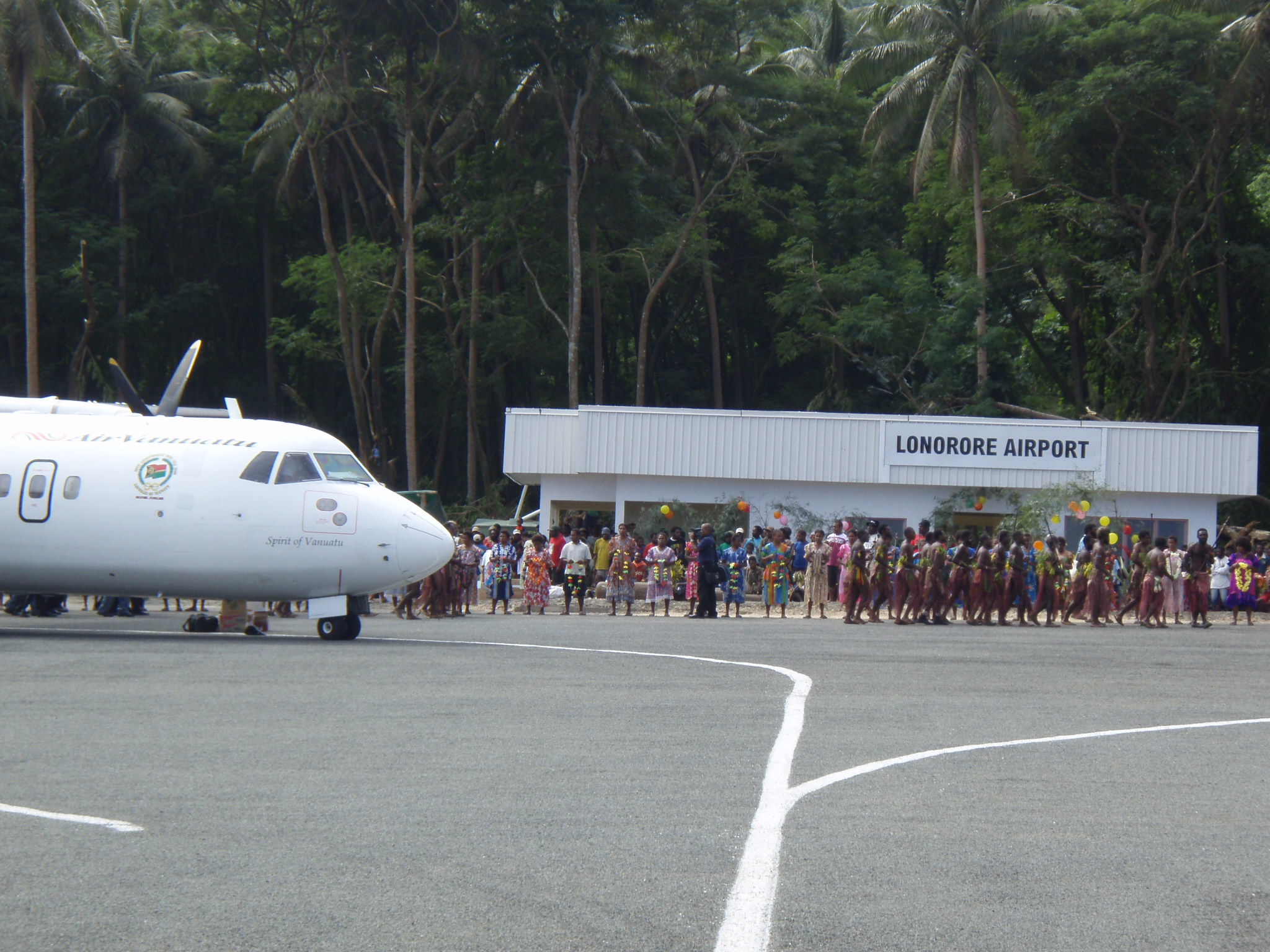
- IATA: LNE; ICAO: NVSO

Summary
- Airport type: Public
- Serves: southern Pentecost Island, Vanuatu
- Elevation AMSL: 43 ft (13 m)
- Coordinates: 15°51′56″S 168°10′19″E

Map
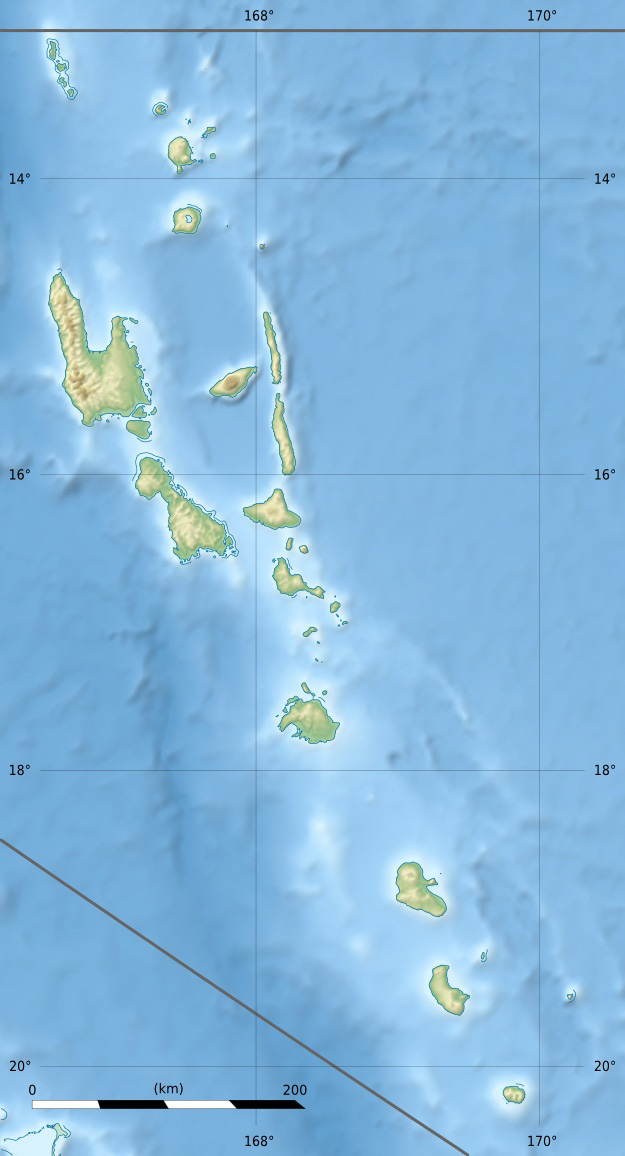
- Location of airport in Vanuatu

Runways
| Direction | Length | | Surface |
| Direction | m | ft | Surface |
|---|---|---|---|
| | 900 | 2,297 |

Lonorore Airport (IATA: LNE, ICAO: NVSO) or Lonoror (possibly from Ske lon or or "in the fences") is an airport on south-western Pentecost Island, Vanuatu, 3 km south of Baravet village.

== Overview ==
Lonorore began as a grass airstrip, capable of accommodating 20-seater Twin Otter aircraft in good conditions, although it was frequently unusable due to waterlogging in wet weather. The airport is in the middle of an old coconut plantation, and was first built as a private airstrip in colonial times by the plantation owner, René Thévenin. The airport was upgraded in 2009 with a longer, tarmacked runway capable of operating in most weather conditions and being used by larger ATR aircraft, though in practice the airport is still serviced only by Twin Otters, together with Islanders and small charter planes.

Lonorore is used for Air Vanuatu domestic flights to Port Vila and Santo, sometimes via Ambae. Schedules change regularly but there are typically flights on two or three days of the week. Between April and June the airport caters for significant numbers of day trippers from Port Vila who come to watch the weekly land-diving ceremonies.

Near the airport is a small post office (currently defunct) and an aid post. On flight days, women often set up markets near the airport, selling homegrown vegetables and homecooked food.

Lonorore is one of two airports on Pentecost, the other being Sara in the north. Lonorore is a long distance from Sara by road, but is occasionally used as an alternative airport by passengers from northern Pentecost when Sara is closed due to adverse weather or volcanic ashfall, as Sara is more vulnerable to these disruptions than Lonorore.

== Airlines and destinations ==
Air Vanuatu connects Lonorore Airport to Santo International Airport (Luganville) and Port Vila International Airport.

== Gallery ==
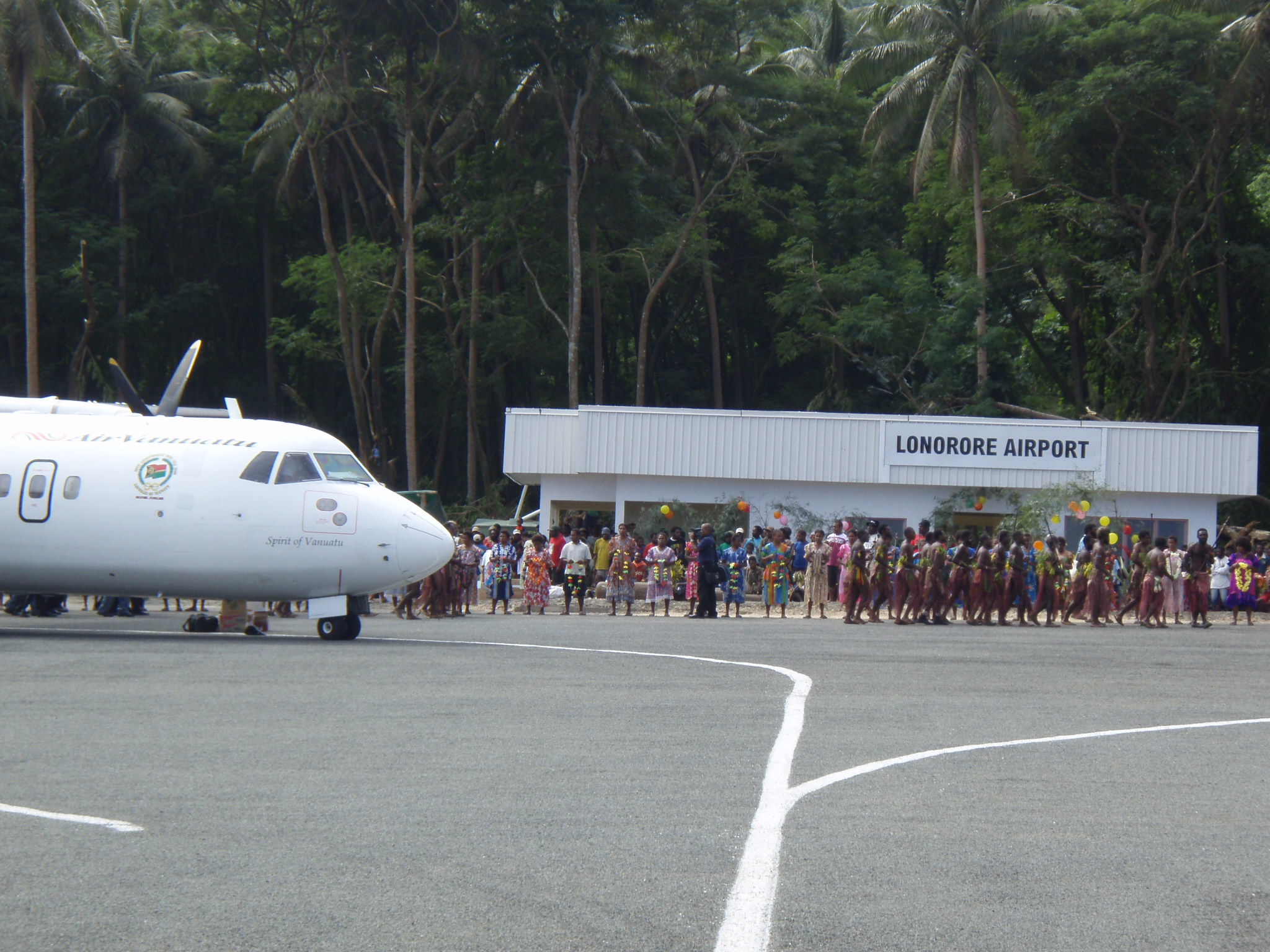
Traditional dancing at the opening ceremony of the upgraded Lonorore Airport, July 2009

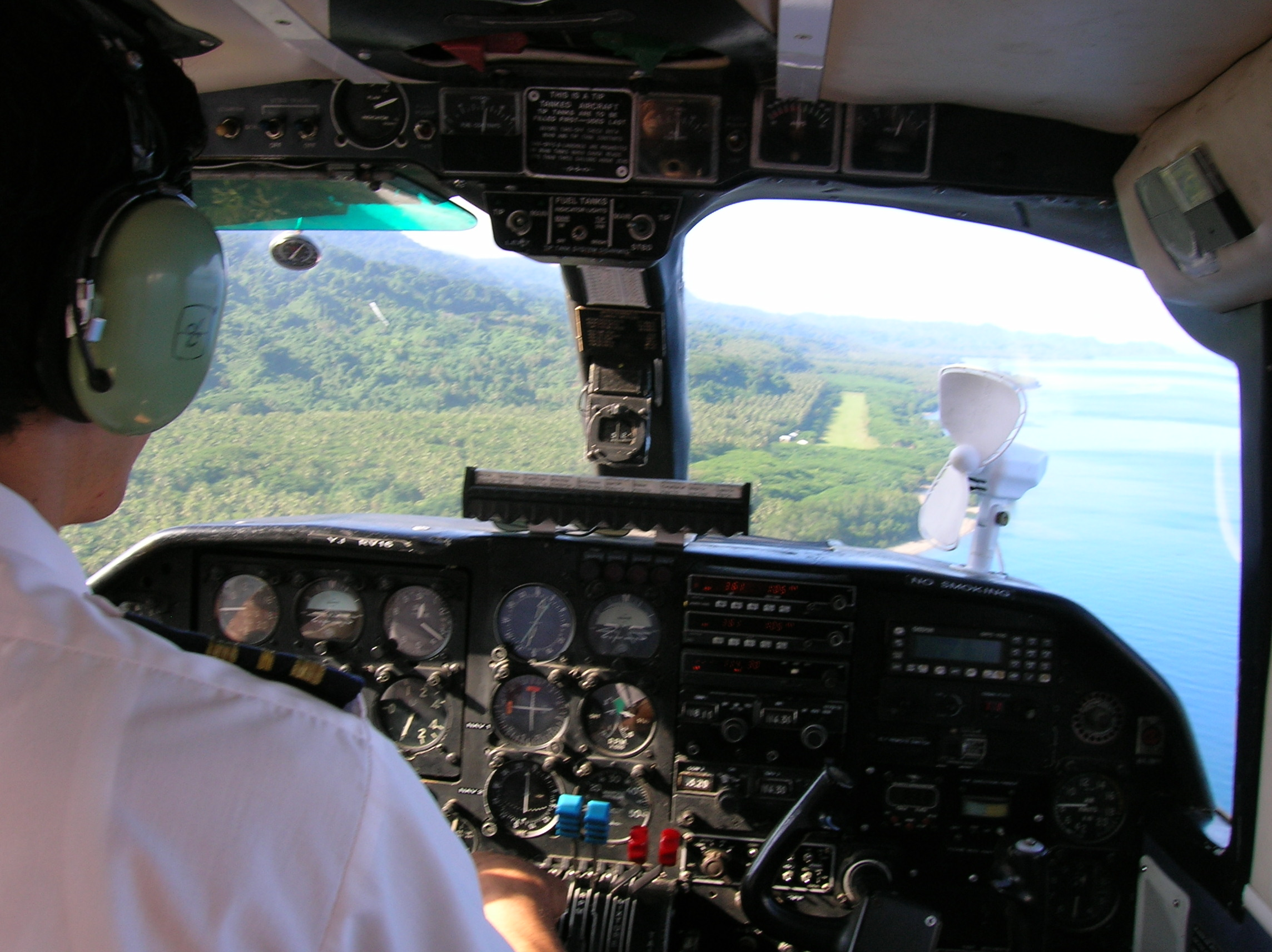
Plane approaching the old Lonorore airstrip, prior to upgrading, 2006
