= Melsisi =

Coordinates: 15.738°S 168.135°E

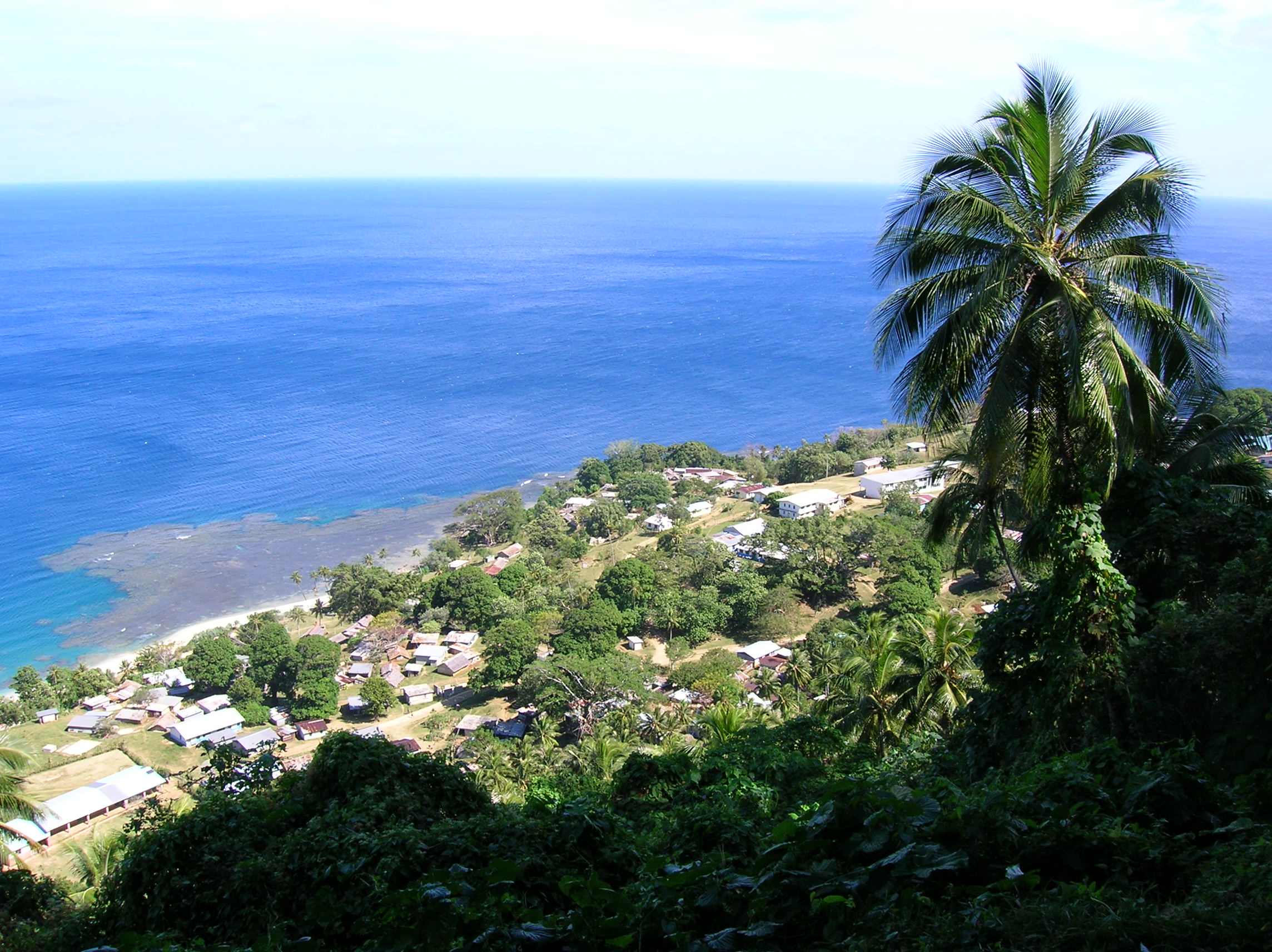
Melsisi in 2006

Melsisi is a large settlement and Catholic mission on the west coast of Pentecost Island, Vanuatu.

The mission includes a large church, convent, clinic, Francophone primary and secondary schools, and a small guesthouse. Melsisi also has a bank and post office, numerous small stores, restaurants, a sports field, and a shed by the beach where cargo ships come ashore. Although Melsisi has virtually no permanent population, many residents from surrounding communities have houses there, which they stay in when visiting Melsisi for church, school, work, medical treatment or transport. Each of these communities has its own nakamal in Melsisi, and many of these nakamals have commercial kava bars alongside.

In the local Apma language, the village's name is really Melsiisii, with a long and stressed final vowel. Apma siisii means to scrabble at or disturb, and locals claim that the site got this name because inhabitants from upland villages were historically harassed when they came down to the sea.

== Geography ==
Most of Melsisi is built on a steep, grassy mountainside. Although located on Pentecost's west coast, due to a kink in the coastline the main part of the village faces almost due south. The island's main north–south road passes through Melsisi, climbing steeply up from the coast through the village and passing over the hill to the north-east. On the hilltop above Melsisi, near the village of Ilamre, is a prominent concrete cross.

Unlike most of Pentecost's roads, the road through Melsisi is surfaced with concrete, a measure necessary to prevent erosion since this section of road is extremely steep. The surfacing of the road has been carried out in stages, with the last section (from the junction below the clinic to the junction behind the church) completed in 2010.

Below the village is a river, which flows out of a deep gorge, and divides inland into two main branches. The northern branch of the river is usually dry, although local legend tells that it used to flow, before being diverted using traditional magic by a man who wanted the water for his own land. On the southern branch there are cascades. The river floods dangerously after heavy rain, although a concrete footbridge 5 minutes' walk upstream from the main river crossing allows it to be crossed in these conditions.

== History ==
Melsisi was founded by Marist missionaries, who originally came ashore in 1898 at Vanrabibi, 3 km to the south-east, at a spot marked today by a concrete memorial. Melsisi was chosen as the site of a permanent mission due to the presence of a reliable fresh water supply. The original mission buildings were located on the field by the river mouth, although the mission was later moved uphill after suffering floods and tsunamis. The ruins of one of the original mission buildings still stand at the corner of the sports field, and it is said that the outlines of other buildings can be seen when looking down on the field under appropriate lighting conditions.

In the large and densely populated but historically inaccessible region inland from Melsisi, native religion survived for quite a long time after the establishment of the mission. Between 1932 and 1941 the Melsisi mission found itself drawn into a spiral of conflicts between Christianised and un-Christianised villagers, culminating with a raid on Vanmwel village in which a chief was killed. Upon hearing of this, the British colonial authorities took several of the perpetrators away to prison in Vila, and had the priest, Père Guillaume, tried in a Nouméa court for inciting the natives to murder. He was acquitted on the grounds that there was no legal code in force on the northern islands of Vanuatu at that time under which killing was a crime. The 'Melsisi Wars' were one of the factors that led to such a code eventually being imposed in 1943.

The church house, one of the largest buildings on Pentecost, was originally built in the late 1950s. Around this time the last un-Christianised members of the community converted to Christianity. The church house was badly damaged in the earthquake of 1999, but subsequently repaired.

Melsisi was catastrophically damaged by Cyclone Harold on 6 April 2020. This storm struck south-central Pentecost near its peak intensity, flattening almost every structure in Melsisi except for a few concrete buildings. Several people were injured by debris and there was one fatality. The church house, hospital, bank and school were all severely damaged. Recovery from the disaster is still underway.

== Language ==
The river at Melsisi originally formed the south-western boundary of Apma language, although today Apma is spoken on both sides of the river. A dialect named Asuk or Asa was originally spoken along the coast north of Melsisi but is now extinct.

Many of the overseas missionaries who came to work at Melsisi acquired fluency in Apma, and until the work of Cindy Schneider and Andrew Gray in the late 2000s, the linguistic notes and religious translations made by these missionaries constituted the main source of written information on Apma language.

The use of Apma by the Melsisi mission is blamed by some for the decline and subsequent extinction of Sowa language, originally spoken south of the river.
