= Ske language =

Austronesian language spoken in Vanuatu

Ske
- Seke
- Native to: Vanuatu
- Region: Pentecost Island
- Native speakers: 300 (2011)
- Language family: Austronesian: Malayo-Polynesian; Oceanic; Southern Oceanic; North-Central Vanuatu; Central Vanuatu; Ske

Language codes
- ISO 639-3: ske
- Glottolog: seke1241
- ELP: Seke (Vanuatu)
- Ske is classified as Severely Endangered by the UNESCO Atlas of the World's Languages in Danger.

Ske (or Seke) is an endangered language of south-western Pentecost island in Vanuatu. Ske is an Oceanic language (a branch of the Austronesian language family).

The Ske area comprises fourteen small villages centred on Baravet in south-central Pentecost, from Liavzendam (Levizendam) in the north to Hotwata in the south and extending inland to Vanliamit. Historically the language's area extended to parallel areas of the east coast, but this part of the island is now depopulated.

Due to intermarriage between language areas, an increasing number of people in Ske-speaking villages now speak Bislama as a first language, and Ske is no longer being actively transmitted to children. A closely related neighbouring language, Sowa, has already been totally displaced by Apma.

The number of Ske speakers is estimated at 300. The widely reported figure of 600 is probably an overestimate, since not everybody in the Ske area is fluent in the language.

There is no significant dialectal variation within modern Ske, although there are noticeable differences between the Ske of older and younger speakers. Doltes, the extinct dialect of Hotwata village, is sometimes regarded as a Ske dialect, but appears to have been closer to Sa.

There is no local tradition of writing in Ske, and until recently the language was virtually undocumented. However, linguist Kay Johnson has written a PhD thesis on the language, including a sketch grammar. Prior to her arrival, the only records of Ske were short vocabulary lists collected by David Walsh in the 1960s, Catriona Hyslop in 2001 and Andrew Gray in 2007.

== Phonology ==
Ske notably drops unstressed vowels. This has resulted in a language rich in consonants, in contrast to related languages such as Raga. Due to the presence of consonant clusters within syllables and other phonological features not typical of the area's languages, speakers of neighbouring languages consider Ske difficult to speak and learn.

Geminate consonants occur where two identical consonants have been brought together by the historical loss of an intervening vowel, for example in -kkas 'to be sweet' (compare Sowa kakas). Geminates contrast with single consonants word initially, e.g., sser 'red mat' and ser 'lantern'.

Unlike neighbouring languages such as Apma, Ske permits a variety of voiced consonants to occur at the end of syllables, although when they occur at the end of an utterance they are often followed by an 'echo' of the previous vowel. For example, skor /skɔr/ 'sago palm thatch' is often pronounced [skɔrɔ].

Stress typically occurs on the final syllable of a word.

=== Consonants ===
Ske consonants
		Bilabial		Alveolar	Velar	Glottal
		Plain	Labio-velarized	Alveolar	Velar	Glottal
Nasal		m	mʷ	n	ŋ	
Plosive	Voiceless	p	pʷ	t	k	
Plosive	Voiced	b	bʷ	d	g	
Fricative	Voiceless	(f)		s		h
Fricative	Voiced	β	βʷ	z	ɣ	
Approximant			w	l		
Trill				r		

- Voiced plosives are prenasalized, contrasting with voiceless plosives. For example, /ti/ [ti] '2SG.FUT' contrasts with /di/ [ndi] 'grow.shoot'. Prenasalization also occurs across word boundaries (sandhi) when the previous word ends in a vowel. For example, 'I'm going to Bwaravet' /mʷa ba bʷaravɛt/ becomes [mwa mba mbwaravɛt].
- Verb-initial /β, z/ become [b, d].
- As of 2014, younger speakers are re-analyzing /pʷ, bʷ, βʷ/ as /pi, bi, βi/. For example, older speakers say /bʷoŋ/ for 'night', while younger speakers say /bioŋ/.
- Bilabial consonants lose their velarization before a consonant or at the end of a word.
- /m/ becomes [mʷ] before back vowels.
- /f/ only occurs in loanwords.
- Some speakers pronounce /z/ as an affricate.
- /ɣ/ is pronounced [g] before voiced phonemes.

=== Vowels ===
Ske monophthongs
	Front	Central	Back
Close	i		u
Close-mid	e		o
Open-mid	ɛ		ɔ
Open		ä	

- /e/ is phonetically [ʲe] after most consonants (generally not after /r, t, p, b/) in a stressed syllable.

Ske diphthongs
Falling	Rising
io	ao
ia	

== Orthography ==
Kay Johnson worked with the Ske community to develop the following orthography:

Ske orthography
Phoneme	Grapheme
ä	a
b	b
bʷ	bw
d	d
e	é; ie (Note: "when realized as a glide" per Johnson (2014))
ɛ	e
g	q
ɣ	g
h	h
i	i
k	k
l	l
m	m
mʷ	mw
n	n
ŋ	ng
o	ó
ɔ	o
p	p
pʷ	pw
r	r
s	s
t	t
u	u
β	v
βʷ	vw
w	w
z	z

Some older sources write /ᵑg/ as ⟨ngg⟩ or ⟨ḡ⟩.

== Grammar ==
Basic word order in Ske is subject–verb–object.

=== Pronouns ===
Personal pronouns are distinguished by person and number. They are not distinguished by gender. The basic pronouns are:

		singular	plural
1st person	exclusive	nou	qmwam
1st person	inclusive	nou	id
2nd person		iq	qmi
3rd person		ni	nier

=== Nouns ===
Nouns in Ske are generally not preceded by articles. Plurality is indicated by placing the pronoun nier 'them' or a number after the noun.

Nouns may be either free, or directly possessed. Directly possessed nouns are suffixed to indicate whom an item belongs to. For example:

dloq 'my voice'
dlom 'your voice'
dlon 'his/her voice'
dlon subu 'the chief's voice'

Possession may also be indicated by the use of possessive classifiers, separate words that occur before or after the noun and take possessive suffixes. These classifiers are:

- no- for general possessions (noq tobang 'my basket')
- blie- for things that are cared for, such as crops and livestock (blied bó 'our pig')
- a- for things to be eaten (am bwet 'your taro')
- mwa- for things to be drunk (mwar ri 'their water') and for buildings (mwan im 'his house')
- bie- for fire (biem ab 'your fire')
- die- for fruits that are cut open (dien valnga 'his bush nut')
- na- for associations, over which the possessor has no control (vnó naq 'my home island')

The possessive suffixes are as follows:

		singular	plural
1st person	exclusive	-q "of mine"	-mwam "of ours" (mine and others')
1st person	inclusive	-q "of mine"	-d "of ours" (yours and mine)
2nd person		-m "of yours" (singular)	-mi "of yours" (plural)
3rd person		-n "of his/hers/its"	-r "of theirs"
Generic		-qze	

A verb may be transformed into a noun by the addition of a nominalising suffix -an:

vwel 'to dance' (verb)
vwelan 'a dance' (noun)

Modifiers generally come after a noun:

vet 'stone'
vet alok 'big stone'
vet aviet 'four stones'

=== Verbs ===
Verbs are preceded by markers providing information on the subject and the tense, aspect and mood of an action. These markers differ substantially between older and younger speakers; the newer forms are in brackets below.

Person	Subject marker - imperfective (present tense)	Subject marker - perfective (past tense)	Subject marker - irrealis (future tense)	English
1st person singular	mwa	ni	mwade or mwan	"I"
2nd person singular	kmwe (mwi)	ki (ti)	ti (de ti)	"you" (singular)
3rd person singular	m[w] or mwe	a	de	"he" / "she" / "it"
1st person dual (inclusive)	ta	kra (tra)	tra (de tra)	"we" (you and I, two of us)
1st person dual (exclusive)	mwamra	mwara (mwamra)	mwadra	"we" (another and I)
2nd person dual	mwira or mwria	kria (dria)	dria (de dria)	"you" (two)
3rd person dual	mra	ara	dra	"they" (two)
1st person plural (inclusive)	pe	kve (tve)	tve (de tve)	"we" (you and I)
1st person plural (exclusive)	mwabe	mwave (mwabe)	mwadve	"we" (others and I)
2nd person plural	bi	kvie (dvie)	dvie (de dvie)	"you" (plural)
3rd person plural	be	ave	dve	"they"

There is a pattern of verb-consonant mutation whereby v at the start of a verb changes to b, and vw to bw. This mutation occurs in imperfective aspect (present tense), and in irrealis mood (future tense):

ni va = I went
mwa ba = I am going
mwade ba = I will go

(Among a few older speakers there is also mutation of z to d, but most Ske speakers today use only the d forms.)

Hypothetical phrases are marked with mó:

ni mó umné = I should do it

Negative phrases are preceded by kare ("not") or a variant:

kare ni umné = I didn't do it

Transitive and intransitive verb forms are distinguished. Transitive verbs are commonly followed or suffixed with -né:

mwa róh = I move
mwa róh né vet = I move the stone

Ske makes extensive use of stative verbs for descriptive purposes.

Ske has a copular verb, vé or bé.

Verbs in Ske can be linked together in serial verb constructions.

== Sample phrases ==
English	Ske (traditional)	Ske (younger speakers)
Good morning	Vangren a^{m}bis	Vangren a^{m}bis
Good day	Ren a^{m}bis	Ren a^{m}bis
Good evening / Good night	Buong a^{m}bis	Biong a^{m}bis
Where are you going?	Kmwe ^{m}ba e^{m}béh?	Mwi ^{m}ba e^{m}béh?
I'm going to...	Mwa ^{m}ba...	Mwa ^{m}ba...
Where have you come from?	Ki me e^{m}béh?	Ti me e^{m}béh?
I've come from...	Ni me...	Ni me...
Where is it?	Mdu e^{m}béh?	Mdu e^{m}béh?
It's here	Mdu ene	Mdu ene
Come here!	Ti me ene!	Ti me ene!
Go away!	Ti suk!	Ti suk!
What's your name?	Siam ne sien?	Siam ne sien?
My name is...	Siaq ne...	Siaq ne...
Where are you from?	Iq azó ze e^{m}béh?	Iq azó ze e^{m}béh?
I am from...	Nou azó ze...	Nou azó ze...
How much? / How many?	Avih?	Avih?
one	alvwal	alvial
two	aru	aru
three	aziol	aziol
four	aviet	aviet
five	alim	alim
Thank you	Kmwe ^{m}bariev	Mwi ^{m}bariev
It's just fine	Bis knge	Bis knge
