= Vanuatu vatu =

Currency of Vanuatu

VT

ISO 4217
- Code: VUV (numeric: 548)

Unit
- Plural: vatu

Denominations
- Banknotes
- Freq. used: VT 200, VT 500, VT 1,000, VT 2,000, VT 5,000, VT 10,000
- Coins
- Freq. used: VT 5, VT 10, VT 20, VT 50, VT 100

Demographics
- Date of introduction: 1981
- Replaced: New Hebrides franc (at par)
- User(s): Vanuatu

Issuance
- Central bank: Reserve Bank of Vanuatu
- Website: www.rbv.gov.vu

Valuation
- Inflation: 3.9%
- Source: The World Factbook, 2007 est.

The vatu (abbreviation: VT; ISO code: VUV) is the currency of Vanuatu. It has no subdivisions.

== Etymology ==
The term vatu, used in all three official languages of Vanuatu (English, French, and Bislama), was borrowed from the word for "stone" in some indigenous languages (such as Raga vatu). Ultimately, it descends from Proto-Oceanic *patu, from Proto-Malayo-Polynesian and Proto-Austronesian *batu of the same meaning.

== Exchange rate ==
Current VUV exchange rates
From Google Finance:	AUD CAD CHF CNY EUR GBP HKD JPY USD THB EUR JPY
From Yahoo! Finance:	AUD CAD CHF CNY EUR GBP HKD JPY USD THB EUR JPY
From XE.com:	AUD CAD CHF CNY EUR GBP HKD JPY USD THB EUR JPY
From OANDA:	AUD CAD CHF CNY EUR GBP HKD JPY USD THB EUR JPY

== History ==
The vatu was introduced in 1981, one year after independence, to replace the New Hebrides franc at par. The vatu was issued as a single unit with no subdivision, with the 1 vatu coin being the smallest denomination issued, in a similar vein to the (post-1953) Japanese yen and the Tajikistani ruble (although that had an official if theoretical subdivision).

The ISO 4217 currency code for the Vanuatu vatu is VUV. Its nationally recognized symbol Vt is the most often used in written format. The vatu's introduction also saw the end of the official circulation of the Australian dollar in Vanuatu.

== Coins ==
Vanuatu's first post-colonial coin was a 50 vatu coin introduced in 1981 and commemorated 1 year of independence. It was struck in pure nickel like previous issues and was released into circulation, though originally its release was targeted more towards collectors. Shortly thereafter, in 1983, 1, 2, and 5 vatu coins were released in aluminium bronze and 10, 20, and 50-vatu coins were introduced in cupro-nickel, replacing the coinage of the New Hebrides Franc as the new circulation currency. This also replaced the Australian currency that was circulating in the British controlled islands. All Vanuatuan coins depict the Vanuatuan coat of arms, consisting of a native warrior in front of a whorled pig's tusk, a traditional item of value. The reverses depict other traditional items of value.

Due to Vanuatu's French colonial history, the current vatu coins have the same size and coloration of the coins of New Hebrides which are based in part on French units, particularly the 1, 2, and 5 vatu in their similarity in size and composition to the 5, 10, and 20 centimes of the old French Franc. The 10, 20, and 50 vatu bear some similarities to Australian coins but are actually slightly larger with closer approximate size to coins of similar valuation to those in New Caledonia, and French Polynesia. In 1988, a nickel-brass 100 vatu coin was introduced, this coin replaced the 100 vatu note. The coin is of the same size and general thickness of the British 1 pound coin.

In 2011, the Reserve Bank of Vanuatu ceased to issue 1 and 2 vatu coins, which had become infrequently used due to inflation. The coins are still legal tender. Cash transactions in Vanuatu stores are now rounded to the nearest 5 vatu.

As part of a coinage reform, new coins were minted in 2015 by the Royal Australian Mint. The older coins remained in circulation and legal tender.

These coins are denominated 5, 10, 20, 50, and 100 vatu.

Old coinage series (still legal tender)
Denomination	Composition	Diameter	Design on reverse
VT 1	Nickel-brass	16 mm	Shell
VT 2	Nickel-brass	19 mm	Shell
VT 5	Nickel-brass	23 mm	Shell
VT 10	Cupro-nickel	24 mm	Coconut crab
VT 20	Cupro-nickel	28 mm	Coconut crab
VT 50	Cupro-nickel	33 mm	Yams
VT 100	Nickel-brass	23 mm	Coconuts

Newer coinage series
Denomination	Composition	Diameter	Design on reverse
VT 5	Copper-plated steel	19 mm	Traditional outrigger canoe
VT 10	Nickel-plated steel	21 mm	Coconut crab
VT 20	Nickel-plated steel	24.2 mm	Traditional chiefs
VT 50	Nickel-plated steel	27 mm	Kava and coconut
VT 100	Aluminum-zinc-bronze	23.25 mm	Parliament building

== Banknotes ==
On 22 March 1982, notes were introduced by the Central bank of Vanuatu in denominations of 100, 500, and 1,000 vatu. These officially replaced franc notes of the former New Hebrides. In 1988 the 100 vatu note was withdrawn from circulation and replaced by a 100 vatu coin. In 1989, 5,000 vatu notes were introduced.

In 1993, after a financial restructure, the Reserve Bank of Vanuatu took over paper money issuance and introduced newly designed notes for 500 and 1,000 vatu. 200-vatu notes were first introduced in 1995 to cut down on the amount of 100 vatu coins received in change and the need to meet demand by producing more. In 2011, new 5,000 vatu notes were also issued in polymer. Polymer 10,000 notes were issued as a commemorative issue on 28 July 2010. As of 2013, they are no longer in circulation. On 9 June 2014, the Reserve Bank of Vanuatu introduced a new series of notes printed on polymer, among the new series of notes is a new denomination of 2,000 vatu, in addition to regular 10,000 vatu notes.

== Dollar ==
Local residents sometimes refer to a notional dollar, equal to 100 vatu, without specifying which country's currency they have in mind. This stems from the period 1966–1973, when the New Hebrides franc was pegged to the Australian dollar at a rate of 100 francs = 1 dollar. Although no relationship currently exists, it simplifies thinking in the larger numbers which a low-value unit causes. For example, the Government's budget of VT 6,000,000,000 is in fact only about US$50,000,000.

The concept of this notional dollar was supported by the size of the former 100 vatu coin: at 23 mm, it was comparable to the Australian $1 (25 mm) and the New Zealand $1 (23 mm) but the thickness is equivalent to the twelve-sided British £1 coin. It has now been replaced by a scalloped version.

== Pounds and shillings ==
In some Vanuatuan languages, in which counting in large numbers is cumbersome and not well known, 10 vatu is colloquially referred to as "one shilling", and 200 vatu is referred to as "one pound". For example, in the Apma language, "50 vatu" would be selen kalim "five shillings". This roughly reflects the historical exchange rate of the vatu against the pound, although since 2008 the number of vatu to the pound has been significantly lower.

== Alternative currencies in Vanuatu ==
Many communities in Vanuatu continue to conduct ceremonial business such as the paying of fines and bride-prices using traditional items of value, such as pigs, curved boars' tusks and long dyed mats. Vatu is sometimes used as a substitute for traditional valuables in such ceremonies, although the National Council of Chiefs discourages this.

The Tangbunia bank, based on Pentecost Island in Vanuatu, offers accounts and transfers denominated in livatu, a unit of currency equivalent to the value of a fully curved boar's tusk.

== See also ==
- Economy of Vanuatu
