= Avoiuli =

Writing system used in parts of Vanuatu

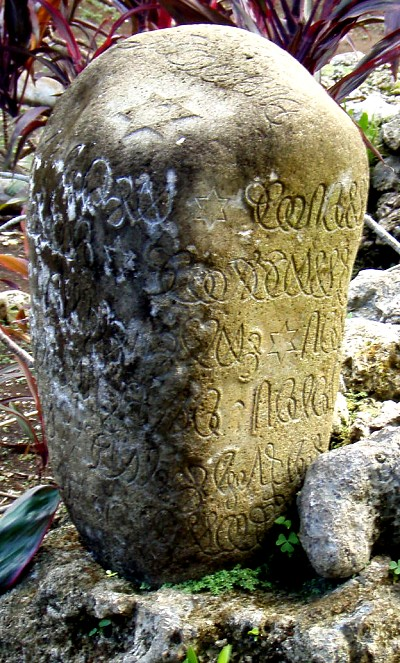
- A stone carved with Avoiuli writing
- Script type: alphabet
- Creator: Viraleo Boborenvanua
- Period: c. 1990 – present
- Direction: Boustrophedon, left-to-right
- Languages: Raga, Bislama, Apma, other languages used in Vanuatu

Avoiuli (from Raga avoi 'talk about' and uli 'draw' or 'paint') is a writing system used by the Turaga indigenous movement on Pentecost Island in Vanuatu. It was devised by Chief Viraleo Boborenvanua over a 14-year period, based on designs found in traditional sand drawings, and intended as a native alternative to the Latin alphabet. It is used mainly for writing in the area's native Raga language, although it can also be used for writing other languages, and is sometimes used to write Apma, Bislama and even English.

== Features ==
The Avoiuli alphabet comprises characters equivalent to the letters A–Z, decimal numerals and other symbols, including a range of currency symbols representing the livatu and specific items of traditional value such as pigs and dyed mats. Like the Western orthography used to write Raga, it represents the velar nasal ng and prenasalised consonant ngg using modified forms of the letters n and g respectively, but represents the labiovelar consonants bw, mw and vw using digraphs. Although in some respects it is a relatively straightforward imitation of the Latin alphabet, Avoiuli has a few distinctive features.

A sign in Bislama written in boustrophedon Avoiuli script. The top-left reads, sab senta blong melenisian institiut blong tijim saen. filosofi. hiumaniti mo teknoloji. lisa vilij lolovini (Sap Centre of the Melanesian Institute for teaching science, philosophy, humanity and technology, Lisaa village, Central Pentecost).

Like the sand drawings on which it is based, Avoiuli words are designed to be formed in a single stroke. The script can be written either left-to-right or right-to-left (with the letter shapes reversed, though the majority are symmetrical anyway). It is intended to be written in boustrophedon style, with alternating lines of left-to-right and right-to-left writing, but it is common for it to follow the left-to-right convention of the Latin script.

Capital letters in Avoiuli are similar to lowercase but are enlarged and drawn around a + shaped 'frame', a feature also seen in traditional sand drawings. Capital letters are not used much in everyday writing.

Students learn to write in Avoiuli at Turaga's traditional school at Lavatmanggemu in north-eastern Pentecost, and at affiliated 'custom schools', paying substantial school fees for the privilege. Avoiuli is also used in record-keeping by the Tangbunia indigenous bank.

== Letters ==
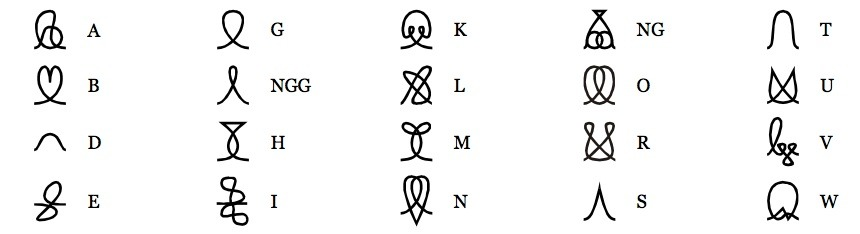

In the official Latin orthography, the 'NG' [ŋ] and 'NGG' [ᵑɡ] shown here are written ⟨n̄⟩ and ⟨ḡ⟩ respectively, with a macron.

The letter 'G' indicates a velar fricative, [ɣ] or [x], and not the voiced velar plosive [ɡ] of English.

The Avoiuli digraphs 'BW', 'VW' and 'MW' parallel the Latin convention, where they indicate labialized consonants [ʷ]. Note also that 'V' can also be pronounced [f], and 'B' can also be pronounced [p].

There are letters to transliterate the rest of the basic Latin script, as well as additional vowels for other languages of Vanuatu.

== Numerals ==
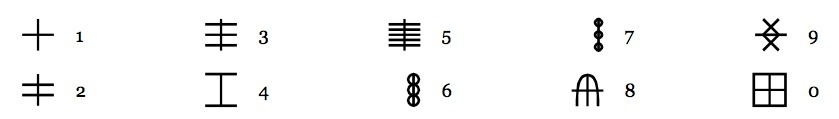

The numerals of Avoiuli script. There are also numerals for higher numbers.
