= Economy of Vanuatu =

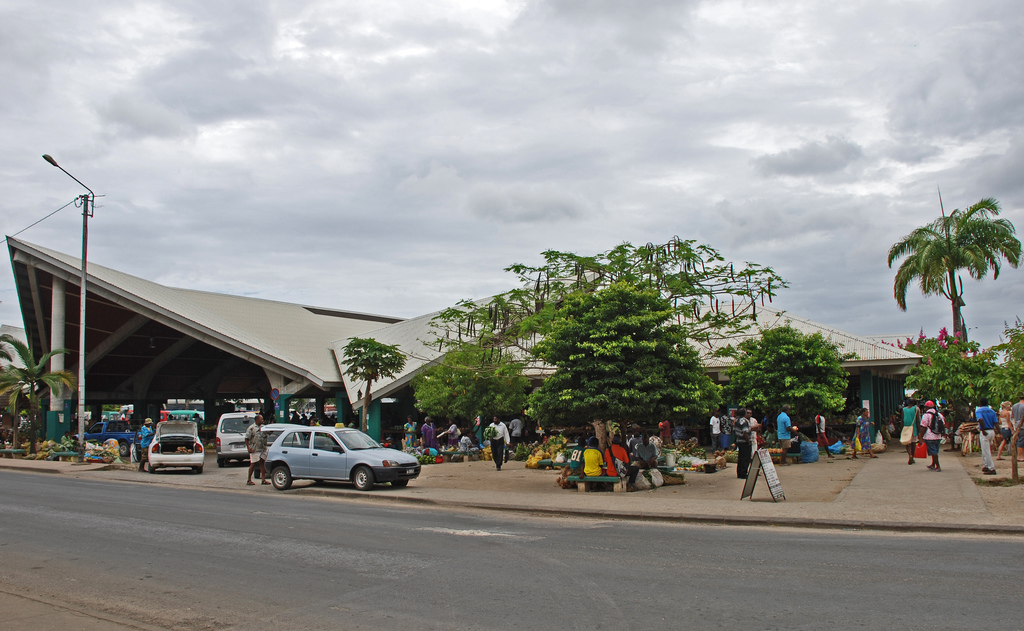
- A market in Port Vila
- Currency: Vanuatu vatu
- Country group: Developing/Emerging

Statistics
- GDP: ▼$0.888 billion (nominal, 2021 est.); ▼$0.888 billion (PPP, 2021 est.)
- GDP growth: 3.5% (2016) 4.4% (2017); 3.2% (2018e) 3.8% (2019e)
- GDP per capita: ▲$3,255 (nominal, 2018 est.); ▲$2,863 (PPP, 2018 est.)
- GDP by sector: agriculture (24.9%); industrial (7.5%); services (60.4%) (2022 estimated)* (2022 est.)}}
- Inflation (CPI): 2.863% (2018 est.)
- Main industries: food and fish freezing, wood processing, meat canning

External
- Export goods: copra, beef, cocoa, timber, kava, coffee
- Import goods: machinery and equipment, foodstuffs, fuels
- All values, unless otherwise stated, are in US dollars.

Vanuatu's economy is primarily agricultural; 80% of the population is engaged in agricultural activities that range from subsistence farming to smallholder farming of coconuts and other cash crops.

Copra is by far the most important cash crop (making up more than 35% of Vanuatu's exports), followed by timber, beef, and cocoa. Kava root extract exports also have become important.

== Economic sectors ==
=== Financial sector ===
In addition, the Vanuatu government has maintained the country's pre-independence status as a tax haven and international financial center. About 2,000 registered institutions offer a wide range of offshore banking, investment, legal, accounting, and insurance and trust company services. On the Tax Justice Network's 2011 Financial Secrecy Index, Vanuatu received a "secrecy score" of 88/100, though its marginal market share placed it near the bottom of the weighted list. Vanuatu was one of three Pacific island nations (along with Nauru and Palau) which four major international banks placed a U.S. dollar transaction ban on in December 1999. Vanuatu sells citizenship for about $150,000, and its passports allow visa-free travel throughout Europe. With demand from the Chinese market booming, passport sales may now account for more than 30% of the country's revenue. Vanuatu maintains an international shipping register in New York City.

=== Fishing industry ===
There is substantial fishing activity, although this industry does not bring in much foreign exchange. Vanuatu claims an exclusive economic zone of 680,000 square kilometres (260,000 sq mi) and possesses marine resources. Some ni-Vanuatu are involved in fishing, along with foreign fleets.

=== Mining industry ===
In contrast, mining activity is unsubstantial.

=== Agricultural sector ===
Exports include copra, kava, beef, cocoa and timber, and imports include machinery and equipment, foodstuffs and fuels. Copra, cocoa, kava and beef account for more than 60% of Vanuatu's total exports by value and agriculture accounts for 20% of GDP.

Vanuatu produced in 2018:

- 374 thousand tons of coconut;
- 53 thousand tons of root and tubers;
- 16 thousand tons of banana;
- 13 thousand tons of vegetable;

In addition to smaller productions of other agricultural products, like peanut (2.6 thousand tons) and cocoa (1.8 thousand tons).

=== Tourism sector ===
Tourism is Vanuatu's fastest-growing sector, having comprised 40% of GDP in 2000. Industry's portion of GDP declined from 15% to 10% between 1990 and 2008. Government consumption accounted for about 27% of GDP.

Vanuatu has commodities, mostly agricultural, produced for export. In 2000, imports exceeded exports by a ratio of nearly 4 to 1. This was offset by high services income from tourism, which kept the current account balance fairly even. After a downturn in 2001 and 2002 due to a decrease in tourism funding, the economy was expected to grow by 3.9%, increasing to 4.3% in 2007.

=== Transport ===
Vanuatu's undeveloped road system, with fewer than 100 miles of paved roads, consists mostly of dirt tracks suitable only for four-wheel-drive vehicles. Every island has one or two short airstrips where Air Vanuatu’s Twin Otter planes land two or three times weekly. In addition, every island has a small port or wharf where small cargo ships and boats regularly dock.

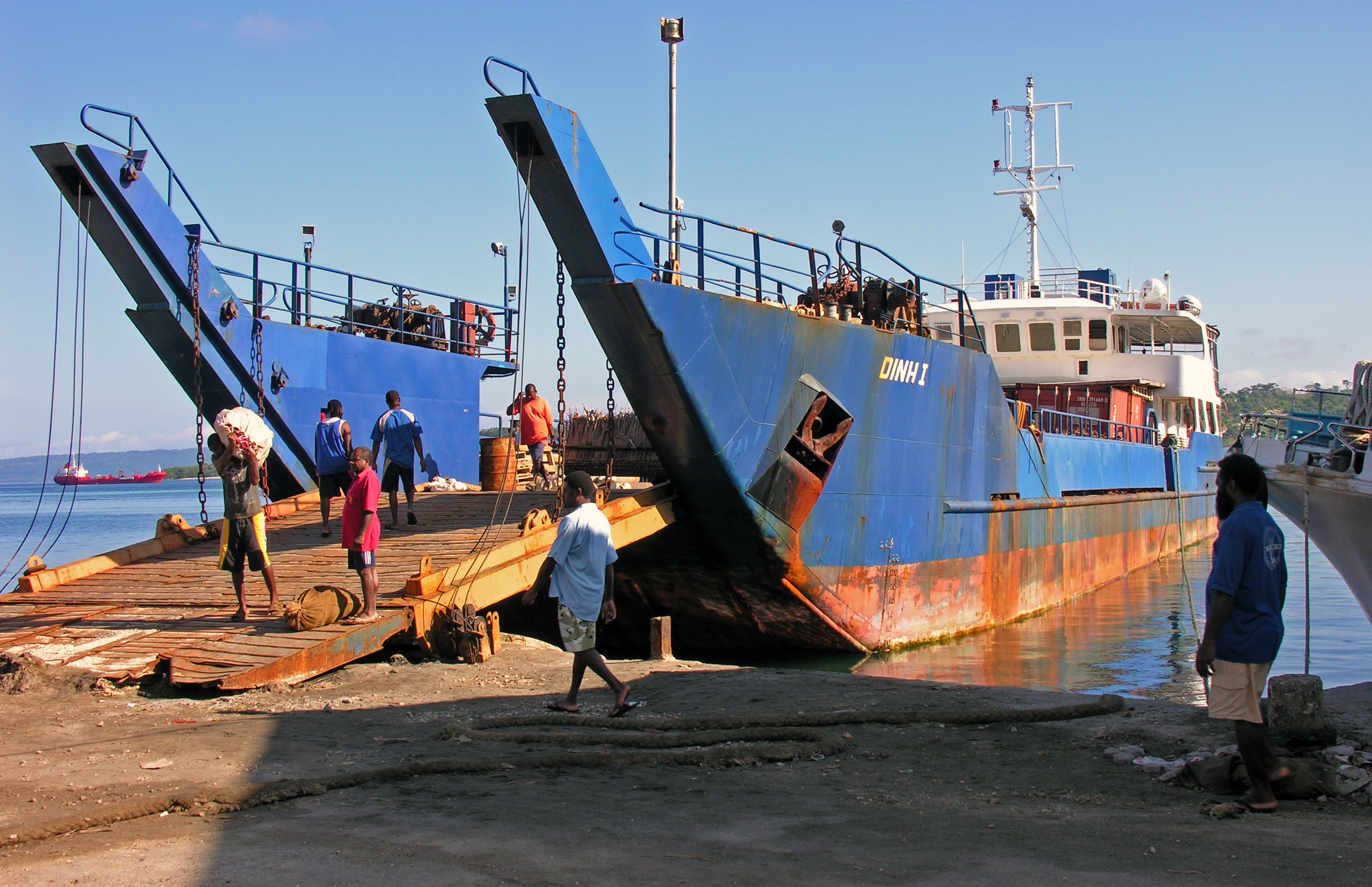
An inter-island ferry

After arrival on an island, transportation is usually via pickup truck, foot, or small boat. Bicycles are becoming popular in Vanuatu. Port Vila and Luganville have numerous taxis and mass-transit vans. There are no railways in Vanuatu, although there was a small rail line on Efate during the colonial era.

Vanuatu's main harbors are Forari, Port-Vila, Santo (Espiritu Santo).

== Reform ==
In 1997 the government, with the aid of the Asian Development Bank, committed itself to a 3-year comprehensive reform program. During the first year of the program the government has adopted a value-added tax, consolidated and reformed government-owned banks, and started a 10% downsizing in the public service. The program was derailed when Barak Sope became prime minister. Under Prime Minister Edward Natapei, reform programs were reintroduced.

== Traditional economy ==
The government declared 2007 to be "the Year of the Traditional Economy" (Bislama: kastom ekonomi), encouraging the trade of sea shells and pig tusks and discouraging cash transfers. By the end of the year, they extended the experiment in to 2008. The establishment of the Tangbunia Bank, to deal in customary wealth, was linked to this initiative.

== Exports ==
Exports of Vanuatu by product category (2019) Chemical products Transportation Machines Mineral products Plastics and rubbers Metals Foodstuffs Precious metals Textiles Instruments Animal products Vegetable products Paper goods Footwear and headwear Miscellaneous Stone and glass Wood products Animal and vegetable bi-products Animal hides Arts and antiques Weapons

Luganville, the second largest city, is a hub for exports with 64.3% of domestic exports leaving it compared to 35.7% for the capital of Port Vila, whereas imports show the opposite trend with 86.9% entering through the capital and 13.1% through Luganville.

== Economic statistics ==
Vanuatu scored 32.06 (versus a worldwide score of 42.94, lower scores translating to higher risk) on the June 2013 Euromoney Country Risk rankings.

All "$" units are US Dollar.

GDP: purchasing power parity - $1.237 billion (2012 est.)

GDP - real growth rate: 2.6% (2012 estimate)

GDP - per capita: purchasing power parity - $4900 (2012 est.)

GDP - composition by sector:
agriculture: 20.6%
industry: 11.7%
services: 67.6% (2012 est.)

Population below poverty line: NA%

Household income or consumption by percentage share:
lowest 10%: NA%
highest 10%: NA%

Inflation rate (consumer prices): 2.8% (2012 est.)

Labor force: 115900 (2007)

Labor force - by occupation: agriculture 58%, industry 10%, services 32% (2010 est.)

Unemployment rate: 1.5% (2010)

Budget:
revenues: $188.2 million
expenditures: $207.4 million, including capital expenditures of $700 000 (2012 est.)

Industries: food and fish freezing, wood processing, meat canning

Industrial production growth rate: 12% (2011 est.)

Electricity - production: 52 GWh (2008)

Electricity - production by source:
fossil fuel: 90%
hydro: 0%
nuclear: 0%
other: 10% (2012)

Electricity - consumption: 40.22 GWh (2008)

Electricity - exports: 220 kWh (2008)

Electricity - imports: 0 kWh (2008)

Agriculture - products: copra, coconuts, cocoa, coffee, kava, taro, yams, fruits, vegetables, fish, beef

Exports: $280 million (f.o.b., 2012 est.)

Exports - commodities: copra, beef, cocoa, timber, kava, coffee

Exports - partners: Thailand 57.3%, Japan 21.8% (2011)

Imports: $242 million (f.o.b., 2012)

Imports - commodities: machinery and equipment, foodstuffs, fuels

Imports - partners: China 26.7%, Singapore 21.2%, Australia 13.6%, New Zealand 7.2%, Fiji 6.7%, Japan 5.4% (2011)

Debt - external: $307.7 million (2011)

Economic aid - recipient: $27.5 million (2002)

Currency: 1 vatu (VT), no subdivisions

Exchange rates: vatu (VT) per US$1 – 94.03 (2012), 96.91 (2010), 111.79 (2004), 122.19 (2003), 139.2 (2002), 145.31 (2001), 129.76 (December 1999), 129.08 (1999), 127.52 (1998), 115.87 (1997), 111.72 (1996), 112.11 (1995)

Fiscal year: calendar year

== See also ==
- Fishing in Vanuatu
