= Nauruan Pidgin English =

English-based pidgin spoken in Nauru

- Region: Nauru
- Native speakers: None; Spoken as a second language by most Nauruans (2007)
- Language family: English pidgin: Chinese Pidgin English and Micronesian Pidgin English; Nauruan Pidgin English

Language codes
- ISO 639-3: cpi (with Chinese Pidgin English)
- Glottolog: None
- ELP: Nauru Pacific Pidgin
- Linguasphere: 52-ABB-db
- IETF: cpi-NR

Nauruan Pidgin English, also called Nauruan Pacific Pidgin is an English-based pidgin spoken in Nauru. It is also known as known as ham soi or ham sui wa (seawater language) in Cantonese. It appears to be the result of a merger of Chinese-type and Melanesian-type pidgins (see Micronesian Pidgin English). The language is endangered.

== History ==
Nauruan Pidgin English developed as a pidgin through the mixing of Chinese Pidgin English and Melanesian Pidgin. Whether Nauruan Pidgin English is Chinese Pidgin English influenced by Melanesian Pidgin, or Melanesian Pidgin influenced by Chinese Pidgin English, or a yet unknown pidgin influenced by both, remains uncertain. Chinese Pidgin English and Melanesian Pidgin were in frequent contact during the 19th century.

In the past, there was a greater variety of pidgin languages spoken among Chinese immigrants on Nauru, starting in 1906, when Chinese laborers began to move to the island in order to work in the island's phosphate mines. By 1914, there were over 500 Chinese laborers on the island. That same year, there were 530 laborers from other Pacific islands on the island.

Over the course of the 19th century, the number of foreign workers fluctuated greatly, but at times could be as much as a half of the total population of Nauru. In 1983, there were 8,042 people living on Nauru, of whom 4,964 were Nauruan. The other 3,078 were a mix of Pacific Islanders from Kiribati and Tuvalu, as well as Filipinos and Chinese people.

Foreign laborers were kept in separate areas from native Nauruans during this time. However, contact happened regardless, which created the kind of informal conditions suited for the formation of pidgins. The need for foreign laborers to communicate with their Australian or Nauruan bosses, who would be speaking English, would also give rise to this.

By the 1930s and 1940s, pidgins were in common use on Nauru.

Nauruan Pidgin English has been superseded by English. As of 2007, the language is spoken by several thousand people, but it is considered a threatened language. It remains in use in commercial contexts, mainly in Chinese-run trade stores and restaurants.

== Usage ==
Nauruan Pidgin English is primarily used in Chinese-run trade stores and restaurants. Such stores and restaurants are typically run in a bilingual manner, such that a customer might order in English and get a response in Nauruan Pidgin English.

Among the Chinese population in Nauru, Cantonese is the first language. Nauruan Pidgin English is not taught in Nauruan schools.

== Linguistic features ==
Nauruan Pidgin English shares about 85% of its linguistic features with Chinese Pidgin English and Melanesian Pidgin. However, it has been clearly demonstrated to be district from Melanesian Pidgin.

== Sample Text ==
Nauruan Pidgin English	English
Fiji god, plandi vijibal a, plandi cuken a, plandi mit...plandi god...plandi cuken bifu kumo a...mi larki go...olegita fiji kem, kabiji olegita, plern kem bak, pope kumo oleguta fiji kem dee a. No god nalu mo...yao fiji no kem a nalu no karkai...no kan karkar...srlip srlip loksi tivi...wota no nalu a...wota no kan.. .hia wota ostenlra srp kem a....	Fiji is good...plenty chicken, beef, pork, eh?...I want to go there...Everything comes from Fiji, cabbage and everything comes by plane, papaya, pork, everything comes from Fiji, eh? Nauru is no good, nothing...If things don't come from Fiji, there's no food in Nauru...You can't eat...just sleep and watch TV...There's no water in Nauru...no water, you can't do anything...water comes here by ship from Australia, eh....
