= Livatu =

Non-legal tender in Vanuatu

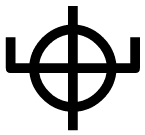
Livatu currency symbol

The Livatu is a unit used by the Turaga indigenous movement and the Tangbunia Bank in Vanuatu to reckon the worth of items of traditional currency such as pigs and textiles. One livatu is equivalent to one fully curved boar's tusk, a symbolic item of value in Vanuatu culture. Long dyed mats, a less valuable item of exchange, are worth up to a half a livatu.

According to Chief Viraleo, manager of the Tangbunia Bank, the value of 1 livatu is fixed at 18,000 vatu (approximately US$160). This approximately reflects the price for which tusks sell in the markets of Port Vila. Account holders at the bank can make transfers and write cheques in livatu.

== Etymology ==
The word livatu is a compound derived from Raga livo "tooth, tusk" and vatu "stone". Livo derives from Proto-Oceanic *lipon, from Proto-Malayo-Polynesian and Proto-Austronesian *lipen, a variant of *nipen/*ŋipen (compare Samoan nifo and Tagalog ngipin). Vatu derives from Proto-Oceanic *patu, from Proto-Malayo-Polynesian and Proto-Austronesian *batu (compare Malay batu, Samoan fatu and Tagalog bato).

== Tuvatu banknotes ==
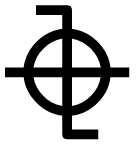
Tuvatu currency symbol

Design of the 5 tuvatu note

In September 2014, the Gaogogona Destiny Reserve System, an institution of the Turaga movement, announced plans to issue paper banknotes, referred to as tuvatu, to be used as an "indigenous currency". (Tuvatu refers to the paper money, while livatu refers to traditional items of value such as pig's tusks.) Sample designs have been issued, in denominations ranging from 1 tuvatu to 1000 tuvatu. Once in circulation these are intended to be interchangeable with the vatu, Vanuatu's normal currency, at a rate of 20,000 vatu to the tuvatu. Compared with the vatu coins and notes currently in circulation in Vanuatu, these banknotes represent extremely large amounts of money, reflecting Turaga's belief that the Western economic system undervalues local people's traditional assets.

The Reserve Bank of Vanuatu has stated that it does not recognise the tuvatu as a currency and warned that those using it risk prosecution, since Section 17.1 of the Reserve Bank Act gives the Reserve Bank of Vanuatu the sole right to issue coins and banknotes in Vanuatu. Turaga dispute this interpretation of the law, arguing that the Reserve Bank Act was intended only to prohibit counterfeiting of vatu, and that the tuvatu is an expression of the right to pursue traditional customs which is enshrined in the Vanuatuan constitution.
