= Green turban =

Green turban may refer to:

- A Sufi Muslim head covering. See Turban#Islam
- Turbo marmoratus, a snail
