= Aquaculture in Vanuatu =

Aquaculture in Vanuatu operates on a small scale, both commercially and privately. Species that were or are being raised include Pacific oysters (Crassostrea gigas), rabbitfish, Macrobrachium rosenbergii and Macrobrachium lar freshwater prawns, Genetically Improved Farmed Tilapia, giant clams, Turbo marmoratus green snails, Trochus sea snails, sea cucumbers and seaweed.

== Species cultivated ==
Genetically Improved Farmed Tilapia (GIFT), a strain of Nile tilapia (Oreochromis niloticus), was investigated in 2004, and is being grown on a small scale on farms on Santo, Tanna and Efate. In 2017, a tilapia hatchery was opened on Santo. In 2025, there were 300 tilapia farmers in the northern provinces; however they faced the problem of high fish feed costs.

Experimental breeding of three species of giant clams was carried out by the Fisheries Department in mid-1999.

The cultivation of Macrobrachium lar in taro terraces is practiced for subsistence purposes, and Macrobrachium rosenbergii has been identified by the Vanuatu government as a high-priority species.

Trochus was traditionally sought in Vanuatu as a high-protein food, but beginning at the start of the 20th century, interest turned to its shell for buttons for high-quality garments and for jewelry. One button blank processing factory in 1986 ballooned into five in 1993. Overfishing reduced that number back to one in 2003. The Fisheries Department operates a small hatchery for trochus, producing juveniles which are used in experiments to study the impact and potential of reef re-seeding as a means of reinvigorating the wild trochus fishery.

The shell of the green snail (Turbo marmoratus) is valued for "decorative inlay work" and had been exported since the start of the 19th century. Stocks were greatly reduced in the 1990s, and the only islands to still have them seem to be Aneityum, Malekula and the Banks Islands. As is the case of the trochus, the government is working to replenish the stocks.

In 2017, the first private sandfish (Holothuria scabra, a type of sea cucumber) hatchery opened at Havannah Harbor on Efate.

In 1999, the Vanuatu Fisheries Department brought Kappaphycus alvarezii seaweed from Fiji for experimental culture. Eucheuma seaweed was cultivated on an experimental basis on Efate, Malekula and Santo in early 2000, paid for by the Fisheries Department, with favorable results, but funding was lacking for the large-scale production required to make exporting economically viable (c. 20 tonnes).

The official Fisheries Department records state that $1165 US of cultured coral was exported from the country in 2000, with 275 pieces in total.

== Government involvement ==
Aquaculture comes under the jurisdiction of the Vanuatu Fisheries Department, under the Ministry of Agriculture, Livestock, Forestry, Fisheries and Biosecurity, with the key legislation being the Fisheries (Amendment) Act No. 38 of 2019.

On September 1, 2008, Vanuatu became the first Pacific Island country to have an aquaculture development plan and an Aquaculture and Fisheries Association.

In 2009, the Fisheries Department opened an aquaculture centre in Port Vila, the capital of Vanuatu.

== Production and employment ==
Aquaculture employed 139 Vanuatans in 2014, 200 in 2015 and 207 in 2016 (34 women and 173 men).

Vanuatu aquaculture produced 16 tonnes of fish and shrimp in 2016, a drastic drop from 2014 due to devastation caused by Cyclone Pam in 2015. Vanuatu leaders had shown interest in introducing more intensive fish farming techniques from Asian countries.

Annual production in 2014 amounted to:

- tilapia (commercial farm) 30 tonnes
- tilapia (village ponds) 1 tonne
- prawns (commercial farm) 13 tonnes
- Macrobrachium (freshwater prawn or shrimp) (village ponds) 120 kg
- giant clam (government operation) 300 pieces
- Trochus sea snail (government operation) 25,000 pieces
- green snail (Turbo marmoratus) (government operation) 2000 pieces

== Foreign investment ==
In December 2023, it was announced that Chinese aquaculture company Chengmai would be partnering with local firm Mata’ariki Investment Holdings, investing ¥500 million (USD 70 million).

== See also ==
- Fishing in Vanuatu
