= Turaga nation =

Indigenous movement in Vanuatu

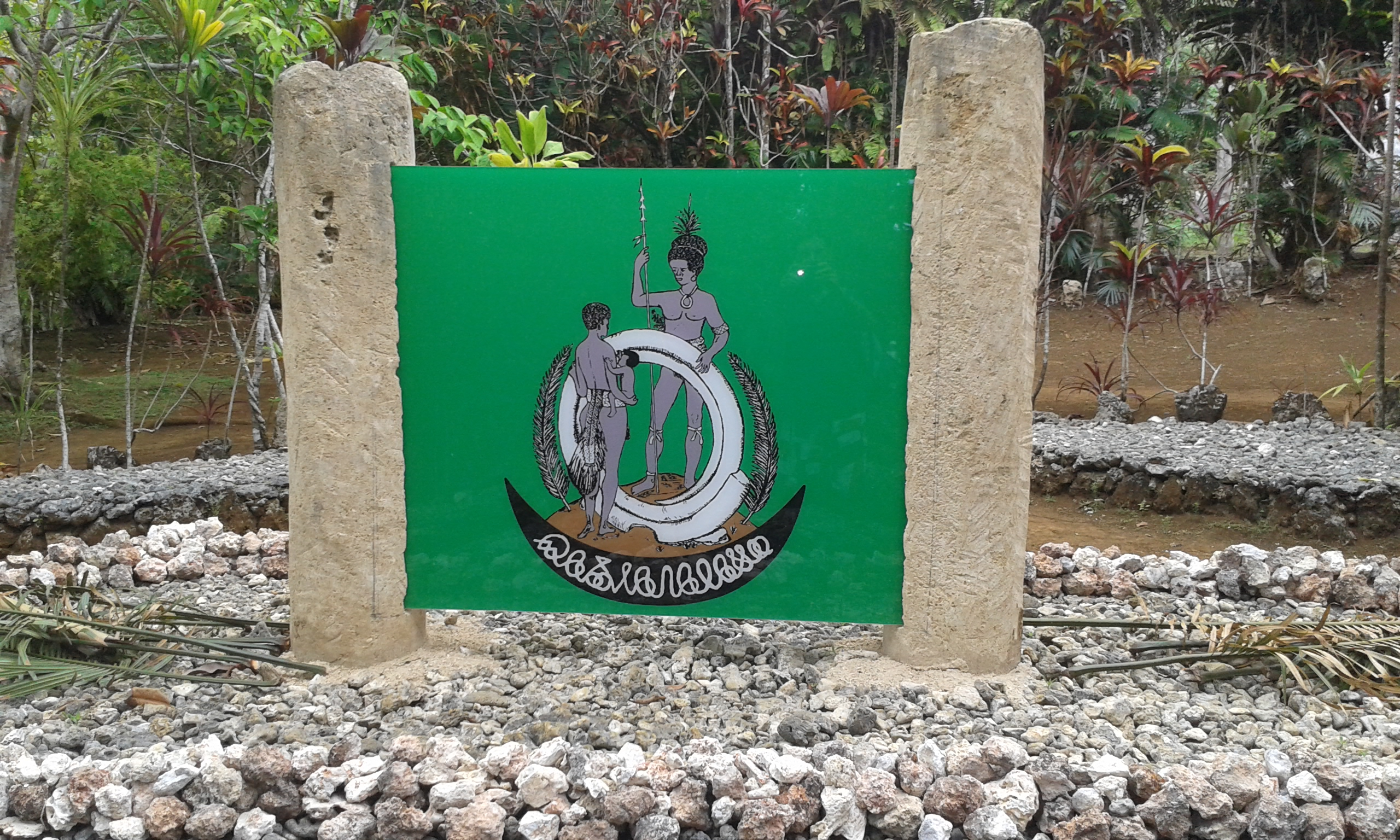
Turaga coat of arms on display at Lavatmanggemu

The Turaga nation is an indigenous movement based in northern Pentecost Island, Vanuatu. Its leader is Chief Viraleo Boborenvanua, and it has also been associated with Motarilavoa Hilda Lin̄i. The organisation has its headquarters in the traditional village of Lavatmanggemu on the north-east coast of Pentecost.

The Turaga movement promotes the revival of traditional Melanesian customs, modernised in certain respects. In place of the Western economic system, which is seen as a cause of poverty and foreign dependency, the movement promotes the kastom (custom) economy, based on traditional systems of economic exchange and native forms of currency such as pigs and woven mats. The Turaga movement operates its own bank (called Tangbunia after the giant baskets in which valuables were traditionally stored) at which these items can be deposited, and has devised a unit of currency (the livatu, equal to the value of a fully curved boar's tusk) in which their value can be reckoned. Turaga has also announced controversial plans to print its own paper currency.

The movement operates a school, the Melanesian Institute of Science, Philosophy, Humanity and Technology (Bwatielen Borebore, Vovoraga, Mwaguana i Gotovigi) at which scholars are offered an alternative to the Western-style education provided by Vanuatu's other schools. The school follows a curriculum of its own creation, with teaching organised according to a native lunar calendar. Scholars write in the native Raga language or in Bislama, using an alphabet named Avoiuli developed by Viraleo and inspired by traditional sand drawings.

The Turaga movement has caused controversy, with some dismissing the movement as self-serving, as a cargo cult, or as a step backwards into heathenism. The movement has also been criticised for promoting its own particular interpretation of traditional culture. However, Turaga's leaders argue that the values they promote are common to all traditional Melanesian societies and are not incompatible with Christianity.

== Etymology ==
The term Turaga, found in Bislama, derives from the Raga words tu "stand" and Raga.
