= Kava culture =

Western Oceanic traditions surrounding kava

Kava cultures are the religious and cultural traditions of western Oceania which consume kava. There are similarities in the use of kava between the different cultures and islands, but each one also has its own traditions.

== Australia ==
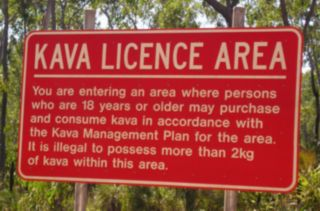
A sign showing a "Kava licence area" at Yirrkala, in the Northern Territory of Australia

In Australia, the supply of kava is regulated through the National Code of Kava Management. Travellers to Australia are allowed to bring up to 4 kg of kava in their baggage, provided they are at least 18 years old, and the kava is in root or dried form. Commercial import of larger quantities is allowed, under licence for medical or scientific purposes. These restrictions were introduced in 2007 after concern about abuse of kava in indigenous communities. Initially, the import limit was 2 kg per person; it was raised to 4 kg in December 2019, and a pilot program allowing for commercial importation was implemented on 1 December 2021.

The Australian Therapeutic Goods Administration has recommended no more than 250 mg of kavalactones be taken in a 24‑hour period.

Kava possession is limited to 2 kg per adult in the Northern Territory. While it was banned in Western Australia previously in the 2000s, the Western Australian Health Department announced lifting of its ban in February 2017, bringing Western Australia "into line with other States" where it has always remained legal, albeit closely regulated.

In 2023, the Australia New Zealand Food Standards Code was amended to significantly reduce the legal availability of Kava in Australia; however, despite the Code being designed to apply to both countries, the New Zealand government retains the right to refuse to adopt amendments they disagree with, and they exercised that right in this case, on the grounds that tightening restrictions on Kava interfered with the cultural rights of Pasifika peoples.

== Cook Islands ==
In the Cook Islands, the reduplicated forms of kawakawa or kavakava are also applied to the unrelated members of the genus Pittosporum

== Fiji ==
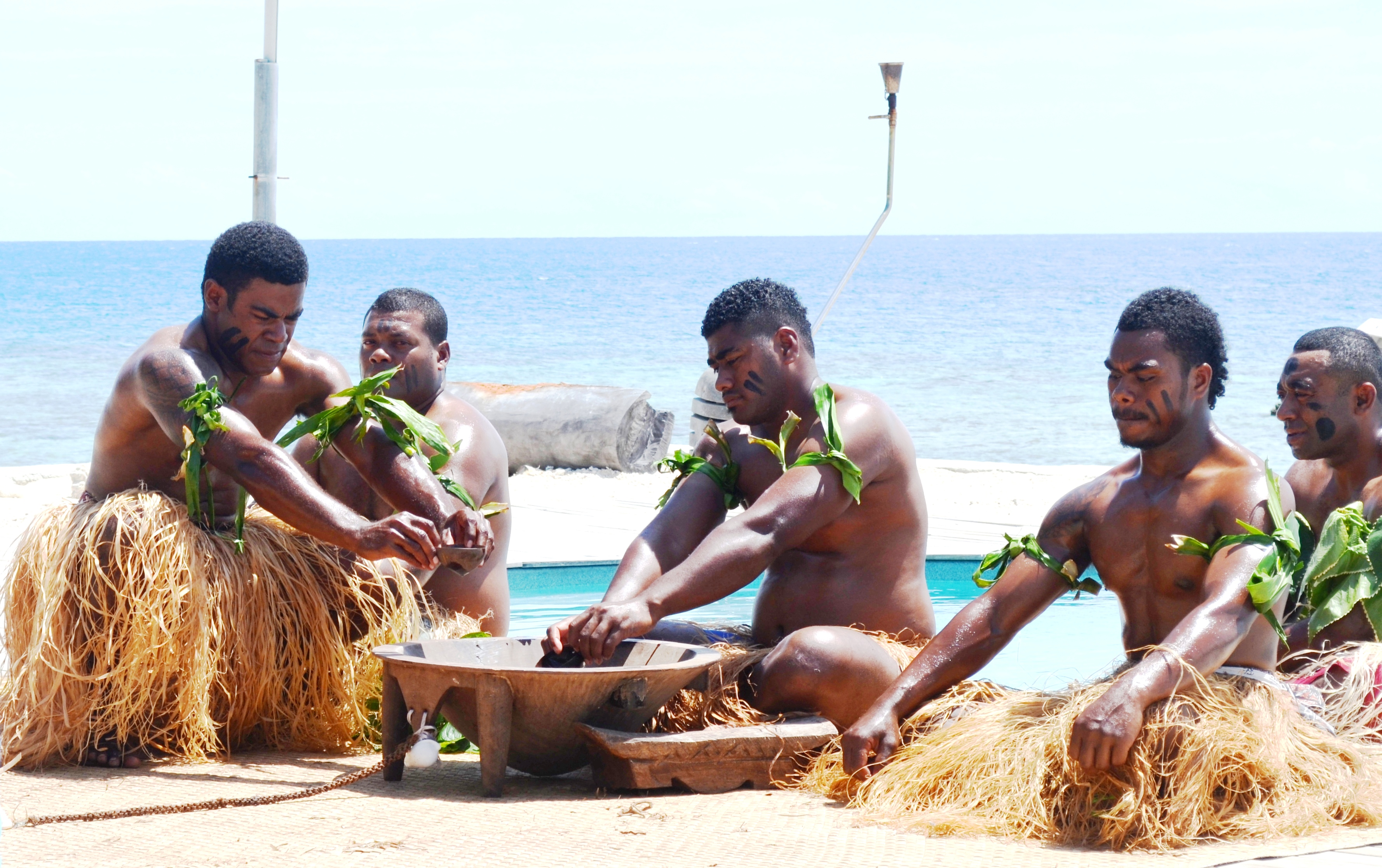
The serving of kava to important guests is conducted by men.

In Fiji, kava (also called "grog" or "yaqona") is drunk at all times of day in both public and private settings. Kava is a cornerstone of Fijian culture, playing a central role in celebrating various stages of life. One of its most significant cultural expressions is the Sevusevu, a traditional ceremony in which a visiting guest presents kava to the chief of the host village or tribe. This offering serves as both a gesture of goodwill and gratitude for the hospitality. In Fiji, kava is consumed by both men and women, reflecting its inclusive cultural significance.

== Futuna ==
On Futuna kava drinking is used to install a new chief.

== Hawaii ==
In Hawaii, at least 13 varieties of ʻawa (kava) have been used for medicinal, religious, political, cultural and social purposes by all social classes, and by both men and women. Although there are 13 distinct cultivars from Hawaii, there are a number of other cultivars found throughout the islands brought in from other locations in Oceania.

== New Zealand ==
When used traditionally, kava is regulated as a food under the Australia New Zealand Food Standards Code. Kava may also be used as an herbal remedy, where it is currently regulated by the Dietary Supplements Regulations. In 2023, the Code was amended to significantly reduce the legal ability of Kava in Australia; however, the New Zealand government decided not to adopt the amendment, on the grounds that doing so interfered with the cultural rights of Pasifika peoples.

Only traditionally consumed forms and parts of the kava plant (i.e., pure roots of the kava plant, water extractions prepared from these roots) can legally be sold as food or dietary supplements in New Zealand. The aerial parts of the plant (growing up and out of the ground), unlike the roots, contain relatively small amounts of kavalactones; instead, they contain a mildly toxic alkaloid (pipermethysticine).

While not normally consumed, the sale of aerial plant sections and non-water based extract (such as CO_{2}, acetonic or ethanol extractions) is prohibited for the purpose of human consumption (but can be sold as an ingredient in cosmetics or other products not intended for human consumption).

In New Zealand, it was applied to the kawakawa (Piper excelsum) which is endemic to New Zealand and nearby Norfolk Island and Lord Howe Island. It was exploited by the Māori based on previous knowledge of the kava, as the latter could not survive in the colder climates of New Zealand. The Māori name for the plant, kawakawa, is derived from the same etymon as kava, but reduplicated. It is a sacred tree among the Māori people. It is seen as a symbol of death, corresponding to the rangiora (Brachyglottis repanda) which is the symbol of life. However, kawakawa has no psychoactive properties. Its connection to kava is based purely on similarity in appearance.

== Papua New Guinea ==
In Papua New Guinea, the locals in Madang province refer to their kava as waild koniak ("wild cognac" in English).

== Rotuma ==
In Rotuma, kava has two contexts, ceremonial and informal.

The kava ceremony, when it functions as part of any ceremonial event, is a highly political affair, with individuals served according to rank. In pre-European times, the kava was chewed by virgin girls, (marked by caked limestone on their hair), before it was mixed with the water to make the drink.

== Samoa ==
In Samoa, kava, called ʻava, is drunk at all important gatherings and ceremonies. The kava is prepared by a group of people called ʻaumaga. It is brought to each participant by the tautuaʻava "kawa server" in the order prescribed by the tufaʻava "kawa distributor". Usually, the highest chief of the visiting party is served first, followed by the highest chief of the host party, and then service proceeds based on the rank of the rest of the participants.

Samoan kawa is served in a polished coconut half called an ipu tau ‘ava. The overall ceremony is highly ritualized, with specific gestures and phrases to be used at various times. It is usually mixed by a high chief's daughter at any ceremony, but in a context where the chief's daughter is not present, then one of the ʻaumaga will have to mix it.

== Tahiti ==
Other than the ceremonial ʻōroʻa ʻava conducted during celebrations of the Matariʻi i niʻa, there is also the informal inuraʻa ʻava done as social events.

== Tonga ==
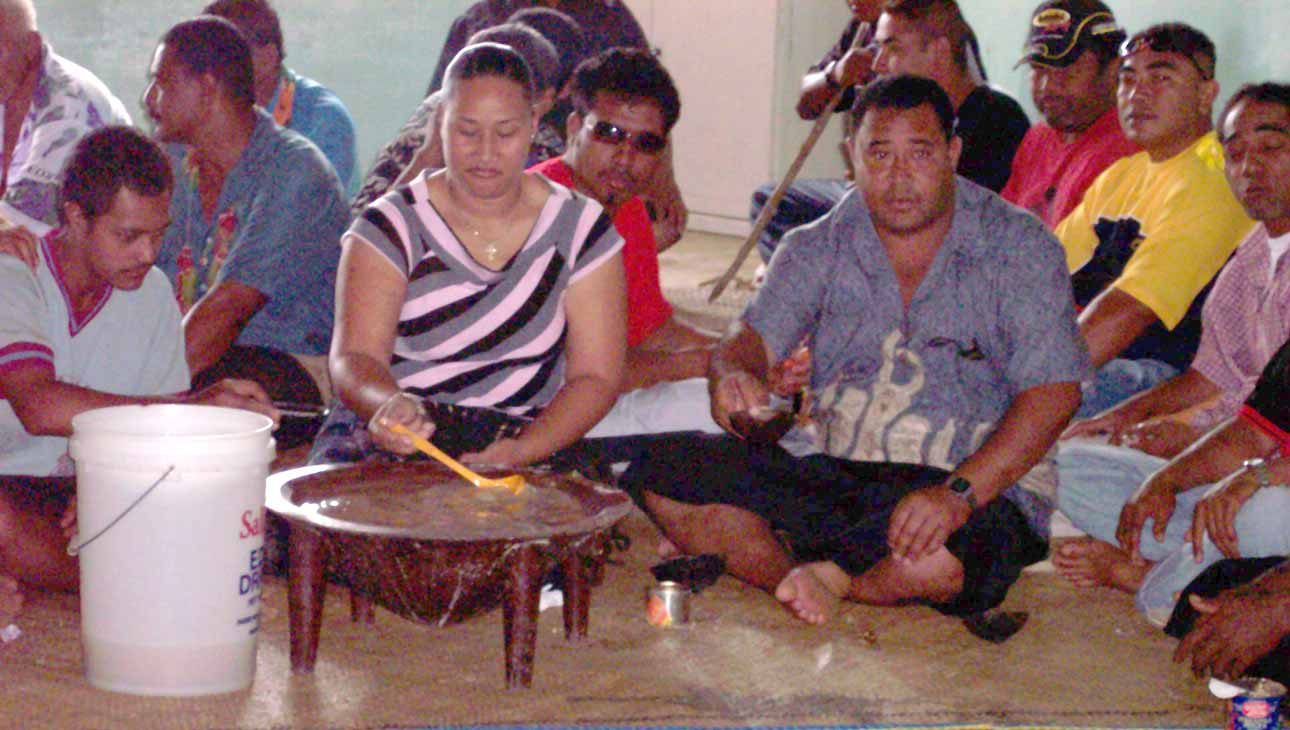
A typical informal faikava in Tonga with the touʻa serving the men.

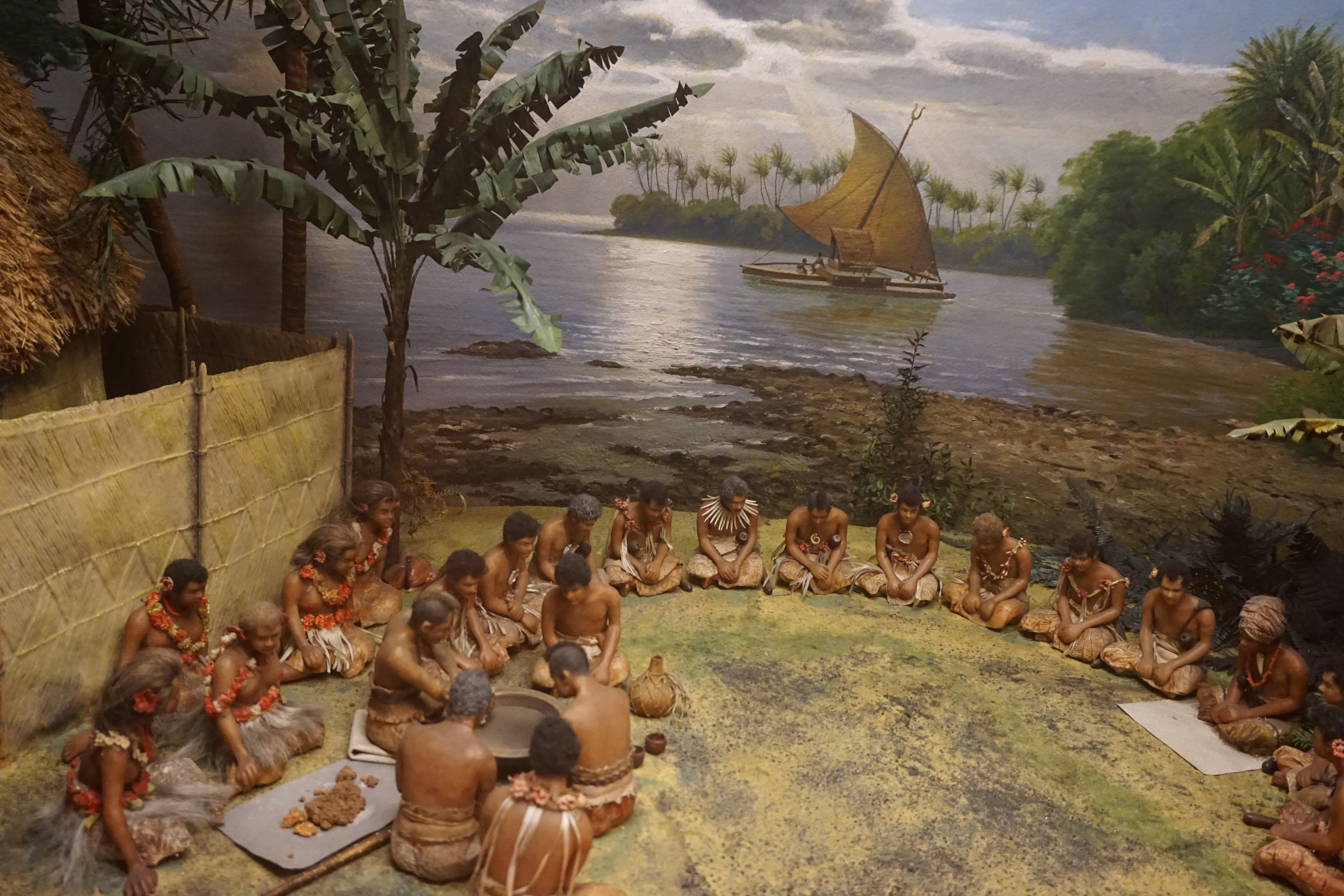
The Kava Ceremony, Tongan Islands, Southwestern Polynesia diorama at the Milwaukee Public Museum

In Tonga, kava may be drunk nightly at kalapu (Tongan for "club"), which is also called a faikava ("to do kava"). In contemporary culture only men drink the kava, although women who serve it may be present. Traditionally kava was drunk by women, and was especially associated with the ancient Tongan gods such as Hikule'o. The female server is usually an unmarried, young woman called the "touʻa." In the past, this was a position reserved for women being courted by an unmarried male, and much respect was shown. These days, it is imperative that the touʻa not be related to anyone in the kalapu, and if someone is found to be a relative of the touʻa, he (not the touʻa) will leave the club for that night; otherwise the brother-sister taboo would make it impossible to talk openly, especially about courtship. Foreign girls, especially volunteer workers from overseas are often invited to be a touʻa for a night. If no female touʻa can be found, or it is such a small, very informal gathering, one of the men will do the job of serving the kava root; this is called fakatangata ("all-man").

The kava is served in rounds. Typically the touʻa will first stir the kava in the kumete, then pour some in the ipu (coconut cups) which are then passed from hand to hand to those sitting farthest away. They drink, and the empty cups are returned again from hand to hand. Everybody remains seated, cross-legged, although one is allowed to stretch the legs from time to time. Meanwhile, the touʻa has filled other cups for those next from the farthest away, and so the drinking goes forth until those nearest to the kumete have had their drink too. Then the men talk again (about politics, sports, tradition & culture, jokes, or anything else) or they will sing a traditional love song, often accompanied by guitar. Some now-famous string bands have had their origin at a faikava. Finally, the next drinking round starts.

In some of the outer islands of Tonga, kava is drunk almost every night, but on the main island of Tongatapu, it is usually drunk only on Wednesday and Saturday nights. Kava drinking frequently lasts as long as eight or nine hours. With the introduction of television, rugby is usually watched by the kava drinkers, and the songs are sung in the commercial breaks. On Saturday nights, a short pause for prayer is made at midnight as the day moves to Sunday, and then hymns replace the love songs. These hymns are mostly traditional English melodies with new words in Tongan.

=== Formal versions ===
All important occasions are also marked by a more formal ritual of drinking kava, including weddings, funerals, graduation from university, and royal occasions. A formal kava ceremony is a component of the accession rites for a King of Tonga, who must participate in the pongipongi to make his rule official.

Formal kava parties follow completely different rules. A male chief is now the touʻa, and the kava is very solemnly prepared by pounding the roots to powder (instead of buying bags of pre-pounded kava powder). Once the kava is of the right strength, as deduced from its colour, the master of ceremonies will call out the nickname of the first recipient using an archaic formula (kava kuo heka). The touʻa will fill the cup and the cup is then brought, often by a young lady, to the intended chief, and brought back afterwards. Then the next name is called, and so forth.

== ʻUvea (Wallis) ==
In ʻUvea (Wallis Island) during informal kava parties, the cups are passed by young boys who are appointed to run around, bringing the cups to the next person. When they get the kava, they pass it to the next person on the side or to the person who has not had one, and the young ones go and get the water to mix with the kava.

== Vanuatu ==
In Vanuatu, kava is traditionally drunk at night in a place called a nakamal. Nakamals are village club houses and in many areas are open only to men. Kava is normally drunk from an empty coconut shell.

In urban areas of Vanuatu there are large numbers of kava bars, which are open to men and in some cases, women. The availability of kava is signalled by a lantern at the entrance, and many kava bars are identified by the colour of their light. In these bars, kava is generally served in plastic or glass bowls instead of coconut shells.

In all these venues the emphasis is more on recreational purposes and socializing than on the spiritual or medicinal qualities of kava consumption.

In northern and central Vanuatu, kava roots are traditionally ground using hand-held stone grinders, while in southern Vanuatu the traditional method of preparation involves chewing the roots, then spitting the resulting paste into a container. Current methods involve preparation in rams (in which kava is pounded in a section of pipe), meat-mincers, and mechanical grinders. After grinding the kava is mixed with water and sieved before serving.

The residue from kava preparation, known as makas (a Bislama term derived from megasse "sugar cane residue"), may be re-used to prepare additional batches of the drink, although these are much weaker than the original batch.

On Survivor: Vanuatu, contestant Chad Crittenden briefly fell ill after drinking a rather potent kava during a native ceremony he attended as a reward.

== Continental United States ==
Kava is legal in the United States and is often served in specialty kava bars. Patrons at kava bars vary from those who use it recreationally (similar to alcohol or legal recreational marijuana in states with licensed retailers) and those who believe in its healing effects, though these have not been proven or tested by the FDA. Kava is sometimes served in the United States alongside the more controversial kratom, a leaf with effects similar to opiates when served as a tea or brew. The first kava bar in the United States, Nakava, was opened in Boca Raton, Florida in 2002 by Laurent Olivier, Diane Lysogorski, and Jeffrey Bowman.

== See also ==
- Cannabis culture
- Drinking culture
- Drug culture
- Tea culture
- Exoticism
- Kava bar
- Tiki culture
  - Tiki bar
