= Nakamal =

Traditional meeting place in Vanuatu

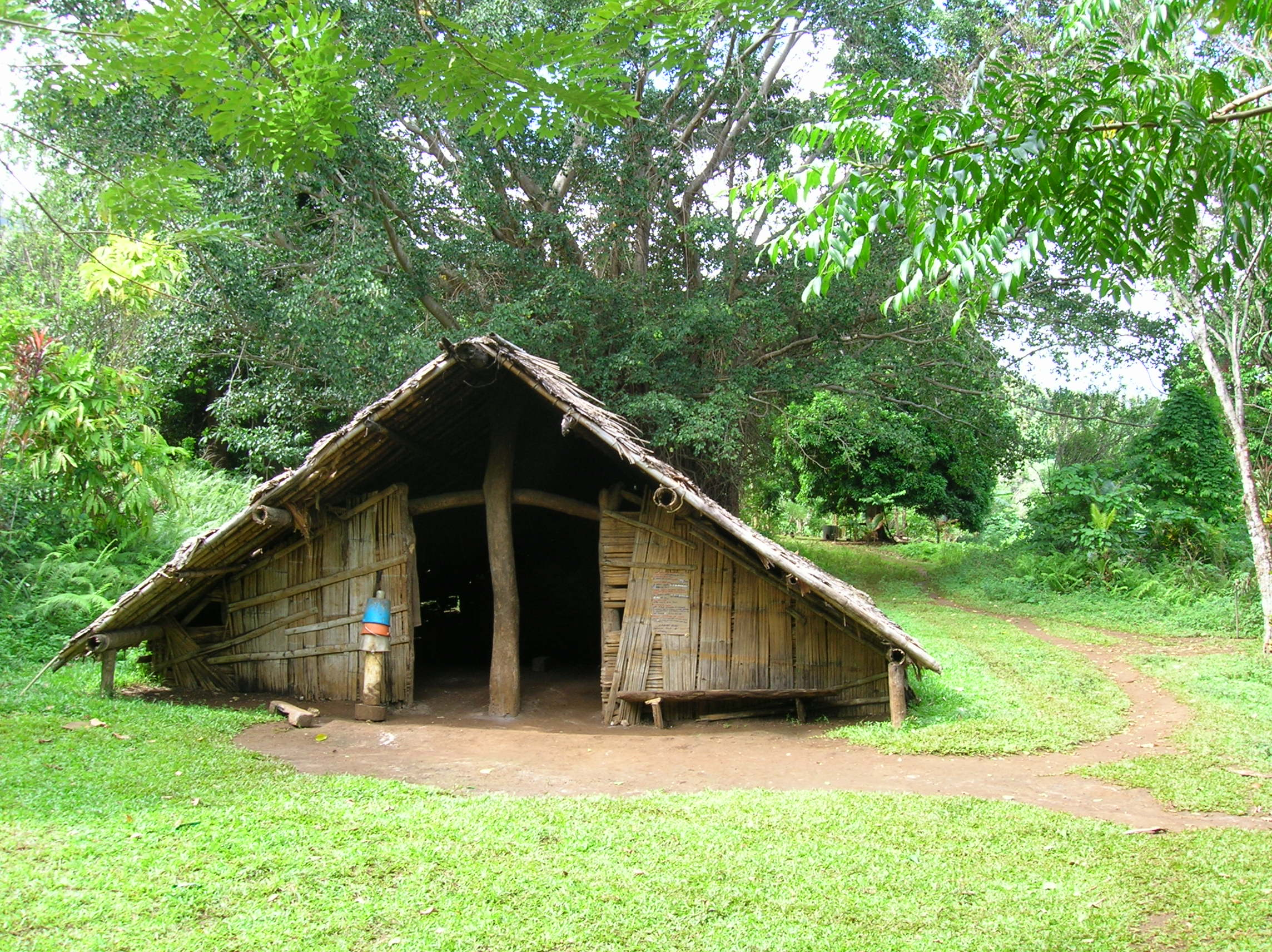
A small nakamal on Pentecost Island

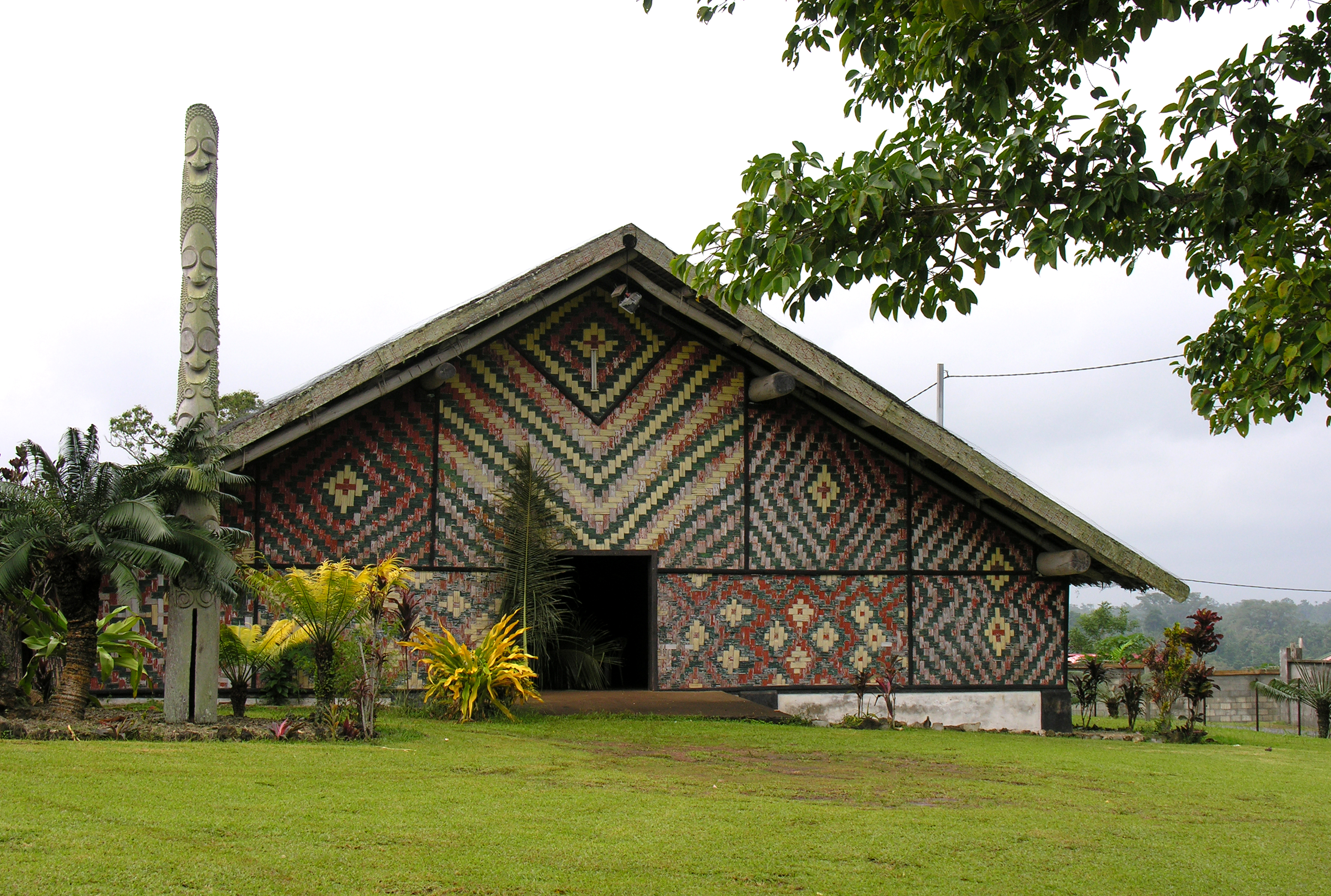
Malvatu Mauri assembly building nakamal in Port Vila, Vanuatu

A nakamal is a traditional meeting place in Vanuatu. It is used for gatherings, ceremonies and the drinking of kava.

A nakamal is found in every significant Vanuatu community, but the design of the nakamal and the traditions surrounding it vary between areas.

== Etymology ==
The term nakamal is a Bislama word, borrowed from certain Oceanic languages spoken in Vanuatu, such as North Efate. In those languages, such a form can be parsed as na kamal(i), combining the common article na and a noun kamal or kamali. Ultimately, it descends from a Proto-Oceanic and Proto-Malayo-Polynesian etymon *kamaliR, meaning "men's house". Cognates in non-Oceanic languages include Cebuano and Tagalog kamalig “granary”.

== Traditional nakamals ==
In north and central Vanuatu, the nakamal generally takes the form of a large building, assembled from traditional materials with the help of the entire community, under the direction of a particular chief. Entry to the nakamal is often restricted to men, and the building may be used as a sleeping and living area for unmarried men and boys and for male visitors to the village. Significantly, most nakamals lack a lockable door, indicating that all friendly visitors are welcome, although there may be a low barrier across the entrance to keep out animals.

In front of a nakamal there is often a flattened clearing, or nasara, used for dances and outdoor gatherings.

In southern Vanuatu, a nakamal may be a large, sheltered outdoor space, such as under a banyan tree.

In Vanuatu's capital Port Vila, the assembly building of the national council of chiefs (Malvatumauri) is designed in the form of a traditional nakamal.

== Nakamal as kava bars ==
The nakamal’s most prominent function nowadays is as a place for the preparation and drinking of kava. In urban Vanuatu, and in neighbouring New Caledonia, the term nakamal may be used for a kava bar where the drink is sold, although in rural Vanuatu a traditional nakamal (where kava preparation is a communal activity and money does not usually change hands) is distinct from a kava bar.

An urban nakamal or kava bar at which kava is available for sale is advertised by a coloured light displayed at the entrance.

== See also ==
- Kava culture
- Tiki culture
  - Tiki bar
