= Malvatu Mauri =

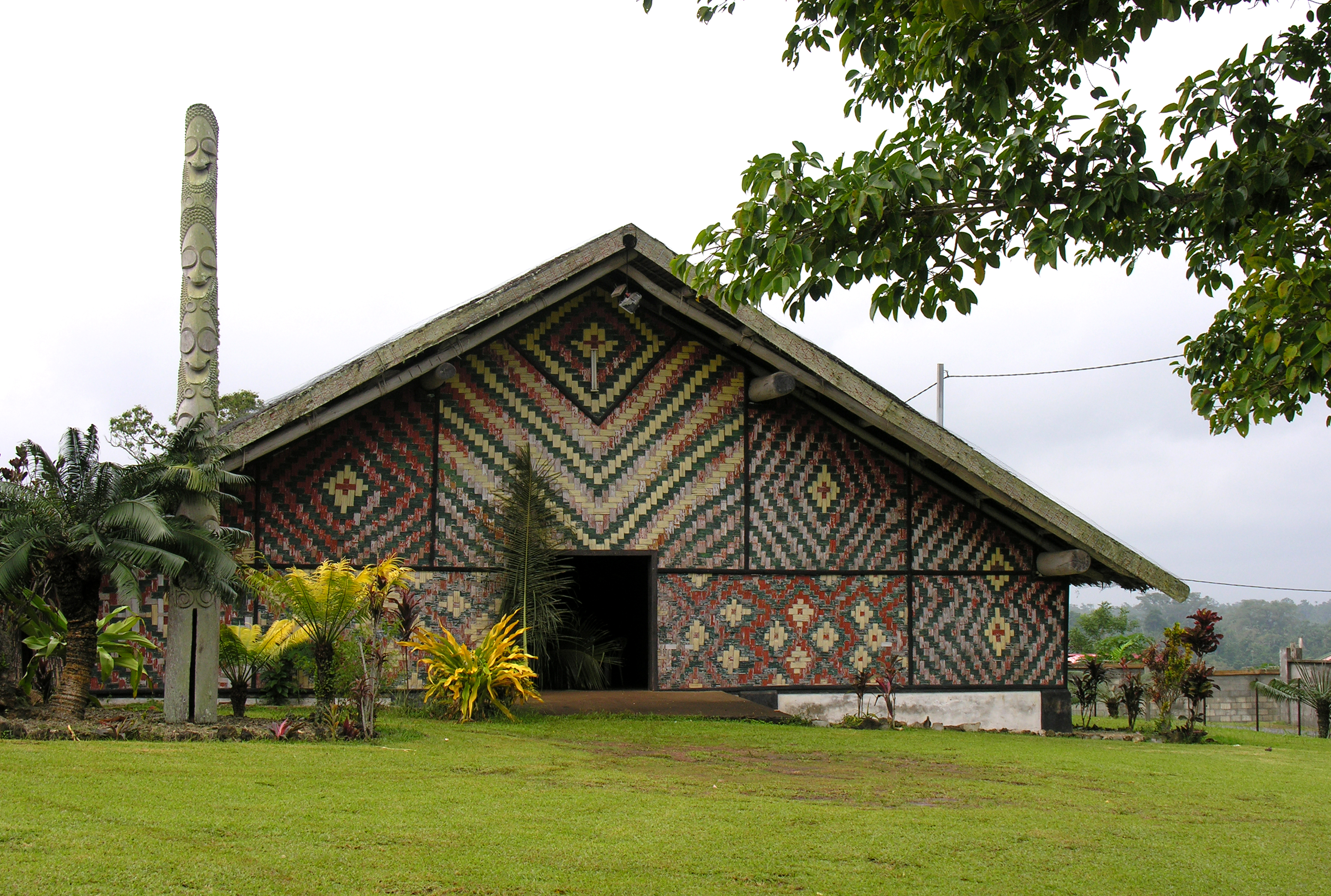
Malvatu Mauri assembly building nakamal in Port Vila, Vanuatu

The Malvatu Mauri (earlier Mal Fatu Mauri; English: National Council of Chiefs) is a formal advisory body of chiefs recognised by the constitution of Vanuatu.

According to chief Willie Bongmatur Maldo, in Bislama "Mal" means chief, "vatu" means stone, island, or place, and "mauri" means something that is alive.

The council was first established in July 1976 with 20 members, and Willy Bongmatur was its first chairman.

Members of the Council are elected by their fellow chiefs sitting in district councils of chiefs. The Council plays a significant role in advising the government on all matters concerning ni-Vanuatu culture and languages.

== See also ==
- Great Council of Chiefs of Fiji
- House of Ariki
