= Yumi, Yumi, Yumi =

National anthem of Vanuatu

English: We are, We are, We are
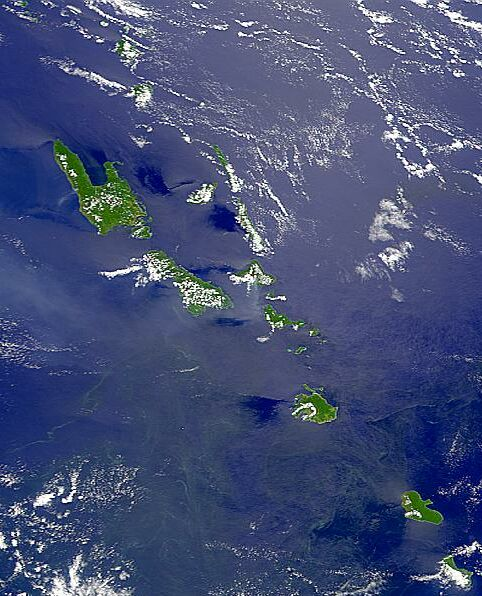
- National anthem of Vanuatu
- Lyrics: François Vincent Ayssav
- Music: François Vincent Ayssav
- Adopted: 1980; 46 years ago

Audio sample
- U.S. Navy Band instrumental version (chorus and one verse): file; help

"Yumi, Yumi, Yumi" (Bislama pronunciation: [ˈjumi ˈjumi ˈjumi]; "We, We, We") is a Vanuatu patriotic song in Bislama, and is the national anthem of Vanuatu. The song was written and composed by François Vincent Ayssav (born 1955) and adopted by the citizens of Vanuatu in 1980.

== History ==
Whilst as the territory of the New Hebrides was an Anglo-French condominium, its co-national anthems were "God Save the Queen" and "La Marseillaise". In 1979, in preparation for independence, the New Hebridean government announced a public competition for entries for what would be Vanuatu's national anthem. Francois Aissav, from Lamap, wrote "Yumi, Yumi, Yumi" to enter into the competition, with the view of it to cause inspiration across the islands. In May 1979, the government jury judging the contest, announced that "Yumi, Yumi, Yumi" had won and would become the Vanuatuan national anthem. When the flag of Vanuatu was raised at the indepdencence ceremony, the majority sang it due to Aissav promoting it via his radio programme on Lycée de l’État Mixte. It is regularly sung at Independence Day celebrations.

Due to English and French being enshrined as the primary languages of education in the Constitution of Vanuatu, "Yumi, Yumi, Yumi" was written in the national language of Bislama so it could be inclusive.

== Lyrics ==
Bislama original

Ramil:
Yumi, yumi, yumi i glat long talem se
Yumi, yumi, yumi ol man blong Vanuatu

I
God i givim ples ia long yumi,
Yumi glat tumas long hem,
Yumi strong mo yumi fri long hem,
Yumi brata evriwan!

Ramil

II
Plante fasin blong bifo i stap,
Plante fasin blong tedei,
Be yumi i olsem wan nomo,
Hemia fasin blong yumi!

Ramil

III
Yumi save plante wok i stap,
Long ol aelan blong yumi,
God i helpem yumi evriwan,
Hem i papa blong yumi!

Ramil

English translation

Chorus:
We are, we are, we are happy to proclaim
We are, we are, we are the people of Vanuatu

I
God has given us this land,
We are grateful for this,
We are strong and we are free in this land,
We are all brothers!

Chorus

II
We have many traditions,
And also many modern ways,
But we are all one,
And this is who we are.

Chorus

III
We know there is much work to be done,
On all our islands,
God helps us in our work,
He is Our Father!

Chorus

French translation

Refrain :
Nous sommes, nous sommes, nous sommes
fiers de proclamer
Nous sommes, nous sommes, nous sommes
les Hommes du Vanuatu

I
Dieu nous a donné cet endroit,
Nous en sommes très heureux,
Nous y sommes forts et libres,
Nous sommes tous frères !

Refrain

II
Nous avons maintes traditions,
Maintes manières d'aujourd'hui,
Mais nous ne sommes qu'un,
Et c'est là notre identité.

Refrain

III
Nous savons qu'il y a beaucoup de travail,
Sur toutes nos îles,
Dieu nous vienne tous en aide,
Il est Notre Père !

Refrain
