= Willie Bongmatur Maldo =

Vanuatuan chief (1939–2009)

Willie Bongmatur Malto

1st President of Malvatu Mauri
- In office 1977–2009

Personal details
- Born: December 12, 1939 Ranmuhu, North Ambrym
- Died: June 12, 2009 (aged 69) Port Vila, Vanuatu
- Resting place: Ranmuhu Village, North Ambrym; 16.10267°S 168.14274°E
- Citizenship: Ni-Van
- Spouse: Lala Sera
- Occupation: Chief

Chief "Willie Bongmatur" Malto (December 12, 1939 – June 12, 2009) was a Chief of Vanuatu. He served as President of Malvatu Mauri Council of Chiefs from 1977 to 1993.

Born in the Village of Ranmuhu, North of Ambrym, and is the founder of Malvatu Mauri National Council of Chiefs. Chief Willie Bongmatur was influential in the formation of the Vanuatu state, and was the first President of the Vanuatu National Council of Chiefs. He was one of the three people who made vows on behalf of the country, alongside the first President of the Republic, George Sokomanu, and the first Prime Minister of Vanuatu, Walter Lini.

Chief Willie Bongmatur says of this occasion: "The promise I made, which I made on behalf of chiefs, to the nation, was to look after the custom and life of the people with respect to unity and justice and other such things, and to help the work of the Government".
