= Micronesian Pidgin English =

Pigdin English spoken in 1800s

- Region: Micronesia
- Era: Late 19th century; survives in Nauruan Pidgin English
- Language family: English-based pidgin: Pacific; Micronesian Pidgin English

Language codes
- ISO 639-3: None (mis)
- Glottolog: None
- IETF: cpe-057
- The languages spoken in Micronesia. English pidgins are not marked.

Micronesian Pidgin English is an English-based pidgin language spoken in nineteenth-century Micronesia. It may have been related to Melanesian Pidgin English, due to prolonged language contact via migrant workers from Melanesia, shared lexicon and similar grammatical innovations. While the pidgin is no longer used, its linguistic features remain in use in Nauruan Pidgin English, which combines it with Chinese Pidgin English.

== History ==
English-speaking traders dominated the area from about 1840, and unstable pidgins were in use by 1860. In 1899 the area passed to German control, and since English pidgin was not used for local inter-ethnic communication, it quickly disappeared, having had been replaced by German by the time German control ended in 1919. Thus, Micronesian Pidgin English was no longer needed in the workplace. German colonial authorities had encouraged pidgins in New Guinea and the Solomon Islands, but not in Micronesia. Additionally, during the era of Japanese imperial rule, Japanese was encouraged as a lingua franca, which would have also played a role in the extinction of Micronesian Pidgin English.

Nauru is the one place where Micronesian Pidgin English didn't die off, instead becoming combined with Chinese Pidgin English to create Nauruan Pidgin English. Micronesian Pidgin English may have also creolized in some beach communities of Kosrae, but no data is available.

Micronesian Pidgin English was spoken in the Carolines (divided between the Palau and the Federated States of Micronesia), the Marshalls, the Marianas (divided between the Northern Marianas and Guam), and the Gilberts (where the most populated part of Kiribati is located) as well as isolates like Wake Island, Nauru and Banaba. Due to the distribution of loanwords on these islands, it's likely that Micronesian Pidgin English developed new vocabulary independently in some instances.
