= Pijin =

English-based creole of Solomon Islands

- Solomonese Pidgin
- Native to: Solomon Islands
- Native speakers: (24,000 cited 1999); 300,000 L2 speakers (1999)
- Language family: English Creole: Pacific; Melanesian Pidgin; Pijin

Language codes
- ISO 639-3: pis
- Glottolog: piji1239
- Linguasphere: 52-ABB-cd

Pijin (Solomonese Pidgin) is a language spoken in Solomon Islands. It is closely related to Tok Pisin of Papua New Guinea and Bislama of Vanuatu; the three varieties are sometimes considered to be dialects of a single Melanesian Pidgin language. It is also related to Torres Strait Creole of Torres Strait, though more distantly.

In 1999 there were 307,000 second- or third-language speakers with a literacy rate in first language of 60% and literacy rate in second language of 50%.

== History ==
=== 1800–1860 ===
During the early nineteenth century, an English jargon, known as Beach-la-Mar, developed and spread through the Western Pacific as a language used among traders (lingua franca) associated with the whaling industry at the end of the 18th century, the sandalwood trade of the 1830s, and the bêche-de-mer trade of the 1850s.

=== 1860–1880 ===
Between 1863 and 1906, blackbirding was used for the sugar cane plantation labour trade in Queensland, Samoa, Fiji and New Caledonia. At the beginning of the trade period, the Australian planters started to recruit in the Loyalty Islands early 1860s, Gilbert Islands and the Banks Islands around the mid-1860s, New Hebrides and the Santa Cruz Islands in the early 1870s, and New Ireland and New Britain from 1879 when recruiting became difficult. Around 13,000 Solomon Islanders were taken to Queensland during this labour trade period.

The (Kanaka) pidgin language was used on the plantations and became the lingua franca spoken between Melanesian workers (the Kanakas, as they were called) and European overseers. When Solomon Islanders came back to the Solomons at the end of their contract, or when they were forcibly repatriated at the end of the labour trade period (1904), they brought pidgin to the Solomon Islands. Old people today still remember the stories that were told by the old former Queensland hands many years after their return

=== 1880–1900 ===
Plantation languages continued into the 20th century even though the process of blackbirding had ceased. Due to the changing nature of labour traffic there was a divergence of Samoan plantation Pijin and New Guinea Tok Pisin and also other plantation Pijin and Oceanic Pijins such as Bislama and Solomon Pijin.

=== After 1900 ===
In 1901, there were approximately 10,000 Pacific Islanders working in Australia, most in the sugar cane industry in Queensland and northern New South Wales, many working as indentured labourers. The Pacific Island Labourers Act 1901, Parliament of Australia was the facilitation instrument used to deport approximately 7,500 Pacific Islanders.

Up until 1911 approximately 30,000 Solomon Islanders were indentured labourers to Queensland, Fiji, Samoa and New Caledonia. The use of Pijin by churches and missionaries assisted in the spread of Pijin.

With Pax Britannica and the advent of the local plantation system in the Solomon Islands, the use of Pijin was reactivated and the language started to spread in the country. It also acquired more Solomonic linguistic characteristics. Throughout the 20th century Pijin kept spreading: historical events such as Maasina Rule and WWII, and social changes such as urbanisation, played a central role in the transformation of the language. It is now the lingua franca of the country, though it has no official status.

=== 2000s ===
Despite being the lingua franca of Solomon Islands, Pijin remains a spoken language with little to no effort made thus far on the part of the national government toward standardising its orthography and grammar. Efforts at standardisation have been made by Christian Associations such as SITAG. There exists a partial dictionary since 1978 (Simons and Young 1978), a full dictionary of Pijin since 2002 (Jourdan 2002), a spelling list (Beimers 2010) and a complete description of its grammar (Beimers 2009). This being the case, Pijin remains a very flexible language where the main focus is on message delivery irrespective of the niceties of formal sentence construction. A translation of the Bible into Pijin also represents a standardisation of some aspects of Pijin.

== Pronunciation ==
English sound – IPA	Pijin sound – IPA	Pijin example	English origin
ch – [tʃ]	s – [s]	tisa, sea, mas (hamas)	teacher, chair, much (how much?)
ch – [tʃ]	si – [si]	sios	church
sh – [ʃ]	s – [s]	sot, bus, masin	short, bush, machine
th – [θ]	s – [s]	maos	mouth
th – [θ]	t – [t]	torowe, torowem, ating, andanit	throw, throw away, I think, underneath
th – [ð]	t – [t]	brata, barata, bro	brother
th – [ð]	d – [d]	deswan, diswan, this wan	this one
th – [ð]	r – [ɹ]	nara, narawan	another, another one
z – [z]	s – [s]	resa	razor
-er – [ɹ]	a – [ɑ]	mata, mada (mami), soa, faea	matter, mother, pain sore, fire
or; ir/er – [oɹ]; [ɹ]	o; a/e – [o]; [ɑ]/[ɛ]	bon, bonem, bone, fastaem, festime (festaem)	born, burn, borne, first time

(Recreated with IPA from Wateha'a, Jourdan, and Mugler.)

=== Variation in pronunciation ===
Several consonant phonemes show variation, in part depending on the speaker's personal linguistic background – i.e. the phonological profile of the vernacular language(s) they speak at home.

Sounds	Pijin	English
b, v	kabis, kavis	edible greens
f, b	futbol, butbol	football
f, p	samfala, sampala	some
p, b	puteto, buteto	potato
r, l, d	raes, laes^{(rare)}, daes^{(rare)}	rice
v, w	volkeno, wolkeno	volcano
j, s, z	jam ([ʧam]), sam, zam	jump
f, h	faea, haea	fire

Several cases of variation are simply due to the regular devoicing of voiced consonants at the end of syllables (a common alternation in the world's languages)

Sounds	Pijin	English
b, p	krab, krap	crab
d, t	hed, het	head
g, k	pig, pik	pig
v, f	faev, faef	five

Other cases reflect the widespread habit, among Oceanic languages, to associate voicing with prenasalization:

Sounds	Pijin	English
b, mb	kabis, kambis	edible greens
d, nd	ridim, rindim	to read
g, ngg	digim, dinggim	to dig
w, ngw	woa, ngwoa	war

== Grammar ==
=== Personal pronouns ===
		singular	dual	trial	plural
1st person	exclusive	mi	mitufala	mitrifala	mifala
1st person	inclusive	mi	iumitufala	iumitrifala	iumifala, iumi
2nd person		iu	iutufala	iutrifala	iufala
3rd person		hem	tufala	trifala	ol, olketa, ota

=== Number ===
Pijin, like other languages to which it is related, involves a distinction between singular, dual, trial and plural pronouns. Dual forms refer to two people or things, trial forms refer to three and plural forms refer to three or more. Such pronoun forms do not occur in English but are common in South Pacific languages.

=== Clusivity ===
Pijin pronouns also use different forms to distinguish between inclusive and exclusive pronouns. The inclusive and exclusive features are only realised in the first person dual, trial, and plural pronoun forms. For example, the first-person dual inclusive pronoun, iumitufala, means 'we' (you and me, including the listener), and the first-person dual exclusive pronoun, mitufala, means 'we' (him/her and me, excluding the listener). This dual inclusive pronoun is used quite frequently in the Solomon Islands. It is used most often in religious sermons when the speaker is referring to a relationship between himself/herself and a specific individual in the audience.

=== Transitive verb suffix ===
In comparison to their original English forms Pijin transitive verbs have an additional morpheme in the form of a suffix. To the English speaker, these morphemes sound like VERB + 'him' or 'them.' The suffix is realised through the morphemes -m, -im, and -em. For example, the Pijin word for 'love' would be lavem.

Examples:

bild-im haos
build+SUF house
'build a house'

pe-im skul yuniform
buy+SUF school uniform
'buy a school uniform'

let-em yu go
let+SUF you go
'let you go'

=== Epenthesis ===
Another linguistic phenomena that occurred in the transitions from English to Solomon Islands' Pijin is the addition of vowels in the interior and final positions of a word. Like in most languages in the Solomon Islands, consonant clusters and consonant-final words do not occur in Pijin. Therefore, speakers of the language add vowels in between consonants and word-finally to adapt the English forms to Pijin grammar. The selection of the extra vowels is usually made in accordance with vowel harmony rules. For example, the word 'business' ([bɪznɛs]) becomes * bisinis or * bisinisi (depending on the age and dialect of the Pijin speaker). 'Work' is waka.

== Sample Texts ==
=== Replies ===
Mi olraet nomoa = 'I am all right'

Mi gut (nomoa) = 'I am good'

Oraet nomoa = 'All right'

Ma iu (yu) hao? = 'And how are you?'

Tanggio tumas = 'Thank you very much'

=== Questions ===
- Wea nao ples blong/blo iu? = 'Where is your place?' (i.e. 'What is your address?')
- Iu stap lo wea distaem? = 'Where are you now?'
- Wanem nao datwan? (pointing to an object) = 'What is that one?'
- Hamas nao bae hem kostem mi fo sendem wanfala erogram go lo' Japan = 'How much will it cost me to send this letter to Japan?'
- Hu nao bae save helpim mifala weitim diswan rabis? = 'Who will/might be able to help us with this mess'
- Wea nao mi bae save paiem fea fo plen? = 'Where will/would I be able I buy a plane ticket?'
- Hamas pipol save fitim insaet lo trak blo' iu? = 'How many people can your truck/car/van carry?'
- Iu garem pikinini? – Nomoa. = 'Do you have children? – No.'

The question can be between question marks since in yes–no questions, the intonation can be the only difference.

- ?Solomon Aelan hemi barava gudfala kandre, ia man? = 'Solomon Islands is a great country, isn't it?'

=== General expressions ===
- Tanggio tumas fo helpem mi = 'Thanks a lot for your help'
- No wariwari. Hem oraet nomoa. = 'No worries. It's alright.'
- Hem! = 'That's it!' or 'That's the one!'
- Hem na ya! = 'Voila!' or 'Told you so!' (A lot of people smile when foreigners use this correctly)
- Iu naesbola tumas! = 'You’re very beautiful!'
- Mi karange! = 'Wow!' [lit. 'I'm crazy']
- Mi dae nau! = lit. 'I'm dying' but used generally to express surprise or shock.
- Tu konman! = 'Liar/Cheat!'
- Iu karange? = 'Are you crazy?'
- Diswan hem bagarap. = 'This (thing) is broken.'
- Mi no save pem. = 'I can't afford it.'
- Iu save gud tumas pijin! = 'You understand Pijin very well'
- Iu save tumas! = 'You know a lot!'
- Mi no save. = 'I don't know' or 'I can't'
- Lukim iu! = 'Bye!' (lit. 'See you!')
- Bro blo' mi / sista blo' mi = 'my brother / my sister' (used respectfully to address the person to whom one is speaking – if spoken by a foreigner it can be quite powerful for breaking the ice)
- Diswan hemi bulsit blo' waitman nomoa. = 'This is simply white-man nonsense.'
- Mi garem soa, mi go long nambanain. = 'I'm injured, and going to the hospital'. (Nambanain 'Number Nine' was the name of the main hospital in Honiara)
- Hemi dae finis. = 'He is already dead.'
- Hamas pipol save fitim insaet lo' trak blo' iu? = 'How many people can your truck/car/van carry?'
- !Nomoa nao! = 'Certainly not!' (The phrase may be between exclamation marks)

=== Introductions ===
Aftanun olketa! = 'Good afternoon everyone!'

Nem blo mi Charles = 'My name is Charles'

Hao nao (iu)? (Iu hao?) = 'How are you'

hu nao nem blo iu? = 'What is your name?'

Iu blo wea? = 'Where are you from?'

Mi hapi tumas fo mitim iu. = 'I'm pleased to meet you.'

Wanem nao langus iu save? = 'What languages do you know?'

== Orthography ==
Pijin Alphabet: Aa, Bb, Cc, Dd, Ee, Ff, Gg, Hh, Ii, Jj, Kk, Ll, Mm, Nn, Oo, Pp, Rr, Ss, Tt, Uu, Vv, Ww.

== Sample text ==
Article 1 of the Universal Declaration of Human Rights in Solomonese Pidgin:

Evri man en mere olketa born frii en ikwol lo digniti en raits blo olketa. Olketa evriwan olketa garem maeni fo tingting en olketa sapos fo treatim isada wittim spirit blo bradahood.

Article 1 of the Universal Declaration of Human Rights in English:

All human beings are born free and equal in dignity and rights. They are endowed with reason and conscience and should act towards one another in a spirit of brotherhood.

== See also ==
- Pidgin
- Creole language
