= Fishing in Vanuatu =

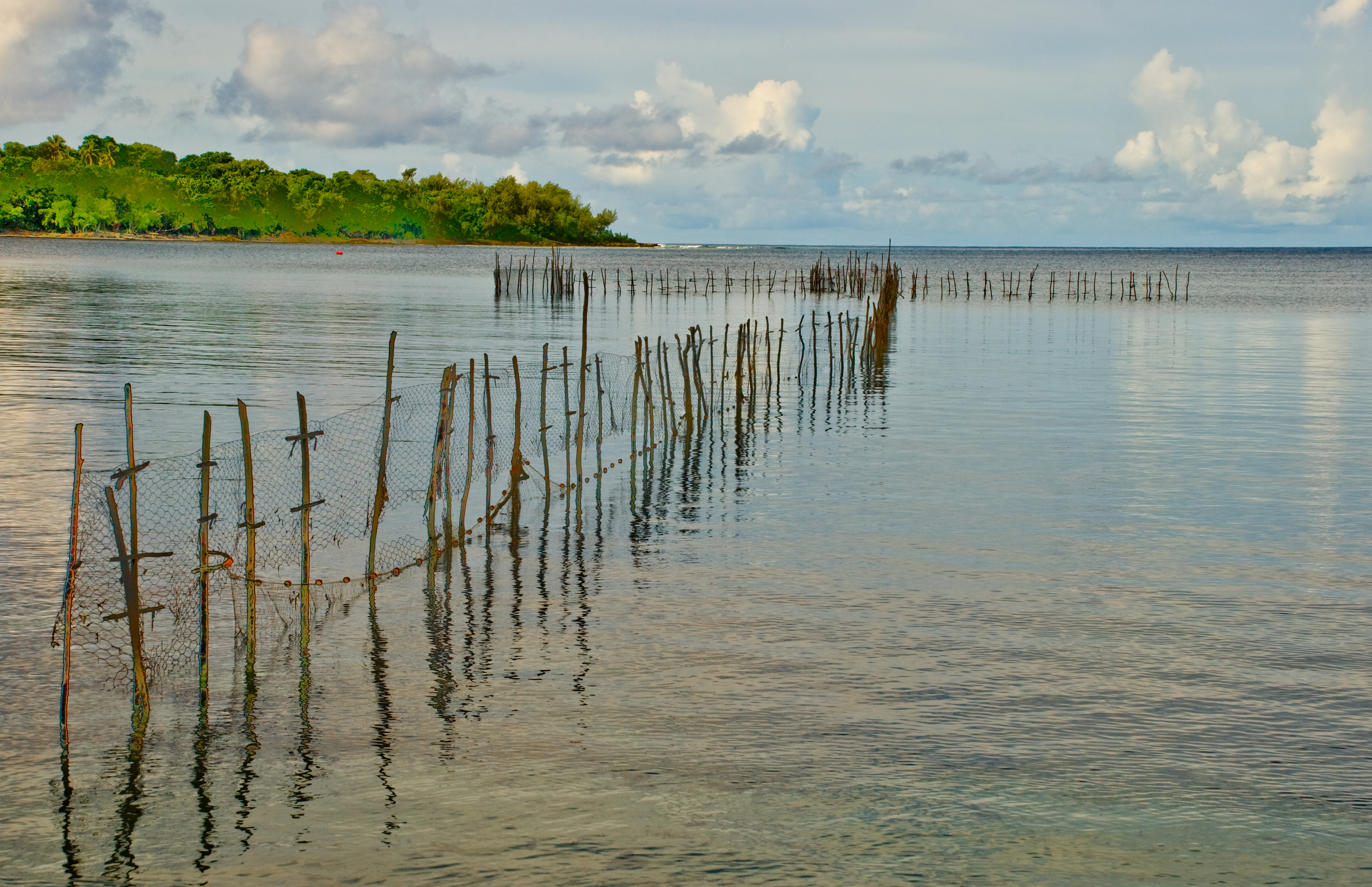
Fish trap, Pango, Efate

Fishing is important to the national economy of Vanuatu. It is the main source of income for many in the islands and Vanuatu's biggest export. According to 2009 figures, approximately 77% of households in Vanuatu are involved in fishing activity. According to 2005 figures, Vanuatu caught 151,080 fish in that year, with frozen fish accounted for half of Vanuatu's commodity exports.

== Geography ==
Vanuatu has 83 islands separated by great depths in the Pacific Ocean. Situated geologically at the edge of the Pacific Plate, the islands' land masses rise to heights of 5 m above the surface, with their bottoms at depths of 1000 m within a distance of 1 km from the coast (they are termed undersea mountains). This situation has created a very congenial setting for pelagic or open water fishing, close to the coastline of the country.

== Aqua fauna ==
The coastal areas offshore of the Vanuatau islands are home to many species of fish. Some of the key species are billfish, including broad bill swordfish, short bill spearfish, sailfish, and striped, black and blue marlin, as well as yellowfin tuna, mahi-mahi, wahoo, Spanish mackerel, dogtooth tuna, coral trout, jobfish, red bass, Watson's bonito fish, dolphinfish, sharks, Skipjack Tuna, and rainbow runners.

== The industry ==
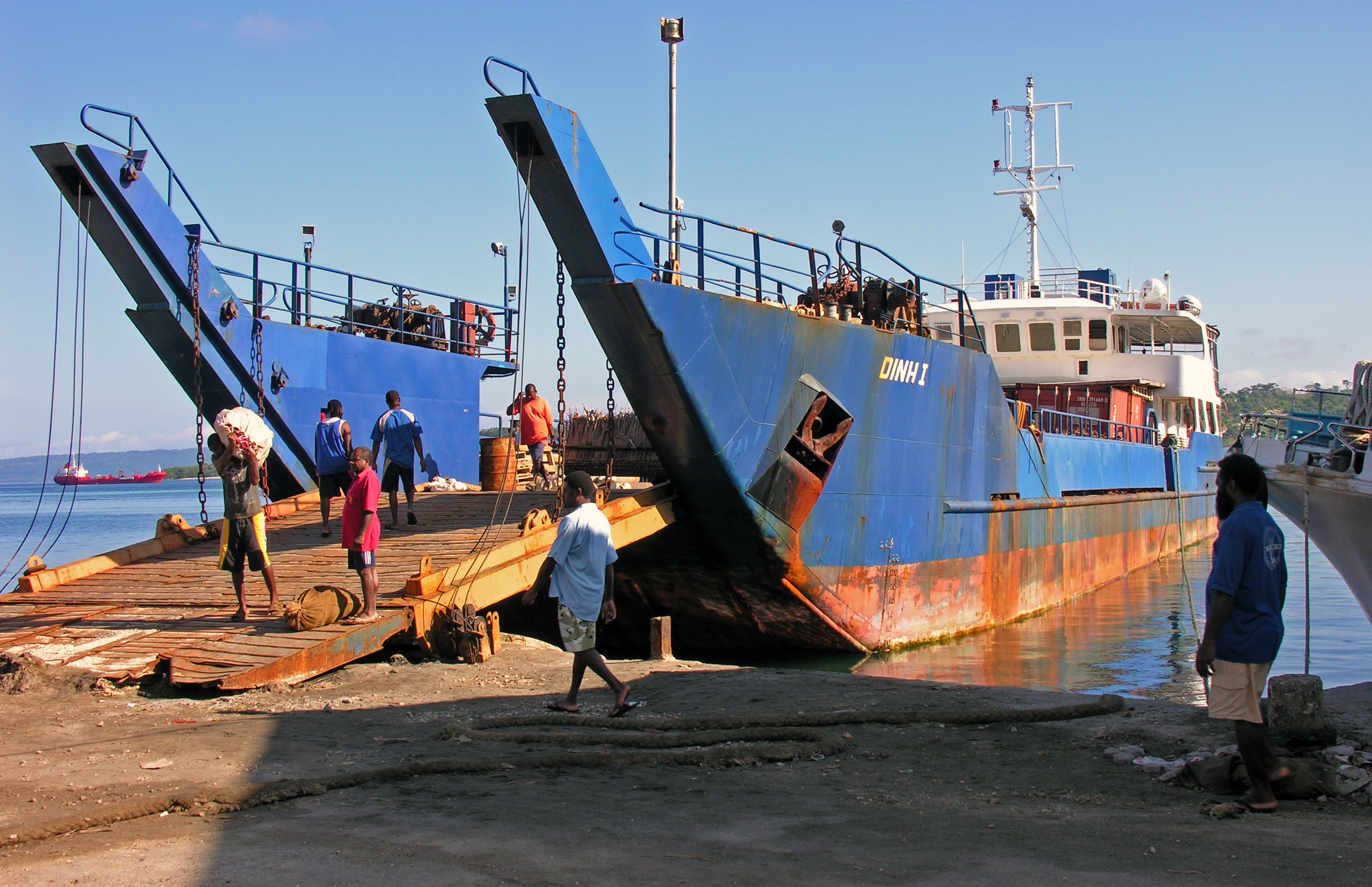
Ferries in Vanuatu

According to 2009 figures, approximately 77% of households in Vanuatu are involved in fishing activity. According to 2005 figures, Vanuatu caught 151,080 fish in that year, with frozen fish accounted for half of the country's commodity exports. Commercial fishing in Vanuatu is done by both locally based deep-bottom fish and sport-fishing charter boats for deep-bottom hand-line fishing and trawling for pelagic species. Apart from small islands, the principal sites for subsistence and coastal commercial fishing are Port Vila, Luganville, Santo, and Malekula islands. Port Vila is the port of greatest commercial importance, with the majority of the produce of commercial produce passing through the port. In 1999, around 80% of all commercial catches (180 tonnes) were landed here; subsistence fishing, which totalled 2,700 tonnes, did not pass through any major port in particular.

According to FAO reports of 1999, the landings of subsistence and Coastal commercial fishing was of the order of 2700 metric tons and 230 metric tons respectively. The catches are unloaded mainly in Port Vila. In addition, foreign based vessels have also operated with catches of 118 metric tons, reported during 2000. Estimates of consumption of fish in the Vanavatu in recent years indicate a consumption level in the range of 15.9 to 25.7 kg per person per year. Considering an increase in population between 1999 and 2025, the estimated fish requirement is of 7,500 mt for 2025.

Aquaculture is also important and Vanuatu has many aqua farms. With the wild stock of Giant clams exhausted, the country has looked for investors in the farming of the species. The government is prepared to offer tax breaks for overseas investors in this industry, as well as in the culture of shrimps. Other opportunities for fish-farming that are being considered include Shrimp, as well as Milk Fish, Prawns, Oysters, and Mullet.

== Management and legislation ==
The fisheries in Vanuatu are managed by the Department of Fisheries under the Fisheries (Amendment) Act No. 2 of 1989, although this act has since been revised. Detailed Legal Acts such as Fisheries Act (1982), Maritime Zones Act 1981 and related Fisheries Regulations 1983 and many other supplementary legislation for commercial fishing both by local and foreign vessels have been enacted and are in force.

All marine activities in Vanuatu must comply with the law, which includes acquiring a fishing license from the department. Since 1983, Vanuatu has participated in the Artisanal Fishing and Subsistence program in cooperation with the Fisheries Department and ORSTOM. Since 1990, there has been a return towards closing certain fishing areas or voluntarily refusing to catch certain species at various times of year in order to promote conservation and increase fish stocks. As of 2007 a license costs $11,000 a year.

In attempting to promote sustainable development and to cooperate with other fisheries in the Pacific region, the government is reviewing an aquaculture development plan and a Tuna Management Plan or National Policy for Tuna Fisheries with assistance from the Canadian South Pacific Oceanic Development Program (CSPOD). Under the Tuna Management Plan, the Fisheries Department, the Vanuatu Maritime Authority (VMA), the Police Maritime Wing, and the State Law Office have been entrusted with the responsibility of enforcing the tuna management plan. The commercial fisheries is according to the defined management plans while in the case of subsistence and village based fisheries the management responsibility is entrusted to the local communities.

== Sport fishing ==
The Department of Customs is responsible for game and sporting boats operating in Vanuatu. Sport fishing in the country has undergone much investment in recent years to promote tourism. Game and reef fishing packages include hi-tech equipment, with day trip or liveaboard options. When sport fishing for dogtooth, yellowfin tuna, or wahoo, the catch is either tagged and released or provided to local villagers. Other fishing options include prawns and eels in the rivers, spear-fishing for green jobfish, diving for crayfish; or traveling to the crater lakes for prawns and eels.

== Role of women ==
Women play a proactive role in fishing operations, along with men, mostly in the shallow near-shore waters. They work in harvesting inshore fish as an essential subsistence requirement. With the use of gillnets, they catch Mangrou, which is in demand and also sea cucumbers, mudcrabs and mangrove oysters. In a few islands, they are also involved in diving to catch trochus. As a part of commercial sale of fish, its products and fish gear, which is their exclusive forte they are involved in collecting seashells, catching coconut crabs, trapping lobsters and processing bêche-de-mer. In the male dominated society their role is not given equal recognition.

== See also ==
- Aquaculture in Vanuatu
