= Reserve Bank of Vanuatu =

Central bank of Vanuatu

Reserve Bank of Vanuatu Reserve Bank blong Vanuatu

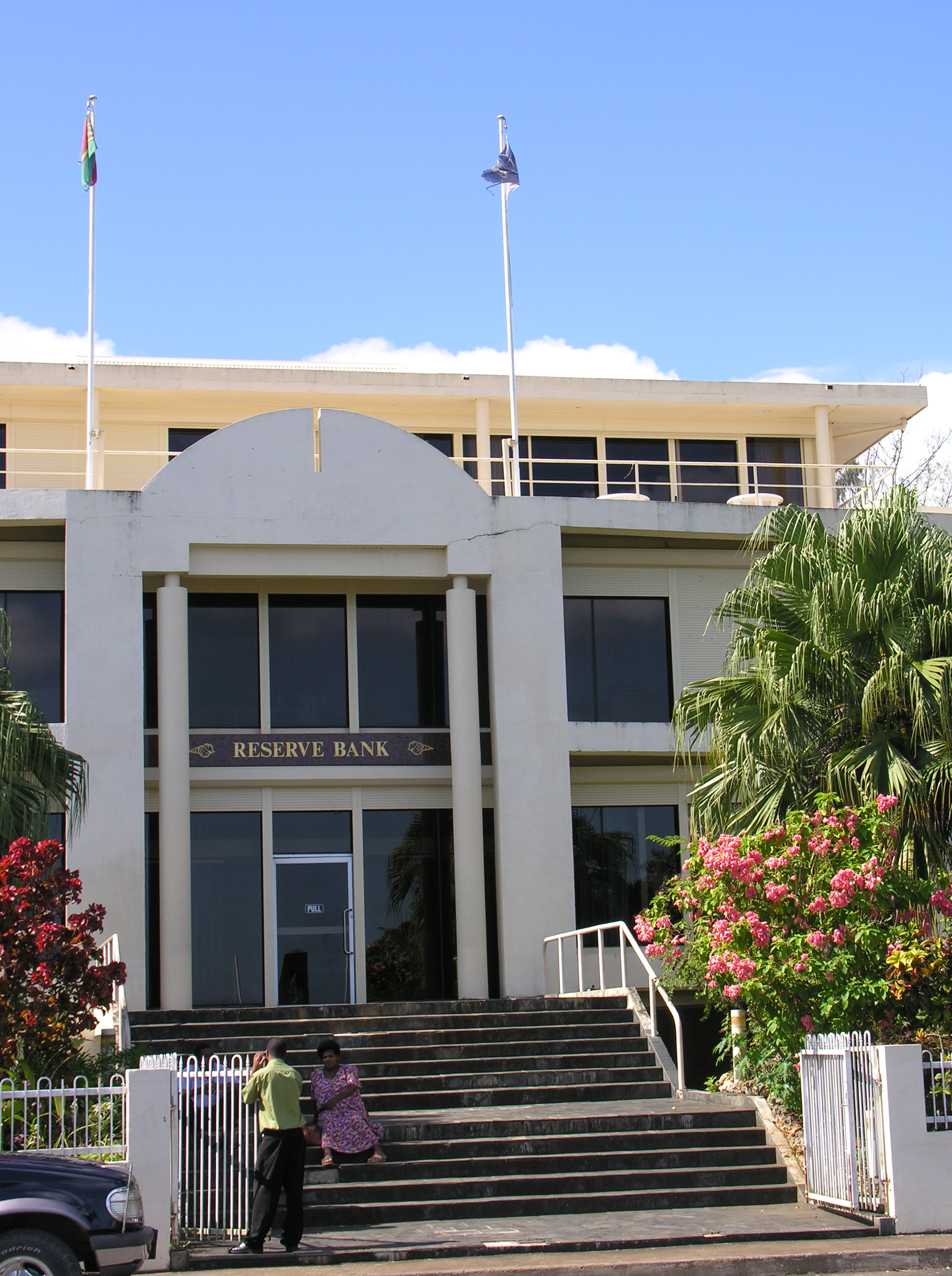
- Central bank of: Vanuatu
- Established: 1 January 1981; 45 years ago
- Ownership: 100% state ownership
- Governor: Simeon Athy
- Currency: Vanuatu vatu VUV (ISO 4217)
- Reserves: 260 million USD
- Website: www.rbv.gov.vu

The Reserve Bank of Vanuatu is the central bank of Vanuatu (an island country located in the South Pacific Ocean). It was initially known as the Central Bank of Vanuatu after the nation's independence from France and the United Kingdom.

The bank began operations on 1 January 1981 and was initially responsible for currency exchange. It established the Vatu as the national currency to replace the circulation of the New Hebrides franc and Australian dollar. The bank also replaced the role of the Banque Indosuez Vanuatu.

The institution's name was changed to the Reserve Bank of Vanuatu in May 1989 and its responsibility over the national banking industry was expanded.

== Role ==
The functions, powers and responsibilities of the RBV are specified in the Reserve Bank of Vanuatu Act [CAP 125] of 1980. The specific purposes of the RBV as spelled out in Section 3 of the Reserve Bank Act are to:

Regulate the issue, supply, availability and international exchange of money;
Supervise and regulate banking business and the extension of credit;
Advise the Government on banking and monetary matters;
Promote monetary stability;
Promote a sound financial structure;
Foster financial conditions conducive to the orderly and balanced economic development of Vanuatu, and
To regulate and supervise domestic and international (offshore) banks.

It is active in promoting financial inclusion policy and a member of the Alliance for Financial Inclusion.

== Board of directors ==
Appointments to the Board of Directors of the RBV are governed by Section 8 of the Reserve Bank Act.

=== Current members ===
Members of the board as of January 2016:

- Simeon Athy, governor (since October 2013)
- Anatole Hymak
- Marakon Alilee
- Georges Maniuri
- Jimmy Nipo

=== Governors ===
- John A. Howard – General Manager, Briton, 1981-1982
- Patrick Noel – General Manager, 1983-1984
- Edward Fillingham – 1985-1987
- Franklyn Kere – First Ni Vanuatu Governor, 1988-1992
- Jayant Virani – Governor, 1992-1993
- Sampson Ngwele – Governor, 1993-1997
- Andrew Kausiama – Governor, 1998-2003
- Odo Tevi – Governor, 2003-2012
- Simeon Athy – Governor, 2013-

== See also ==
- Economy of Vanuatu
- Vanuatu vatu
- List of central banks
- List of financial supervisory authorities by country
