= Forari =

- Village
- Location in Vanuatu
- Coordinates: 17°41′3″S 168°32′48″E
- Country: Vanuatu
- Province: Shefa Province
- Island: Efate
- Time zone: UTC+11 (VUT)

Forari is one of the three most used ports in Vanuatu.

It is on the eastern end of Éfaté Island.

It contains a manganese mine which was opened in 1962 by the French and closed in 1979. In 1971 it was reported that "workable deposits of manganese oxides occur over an area of 25km2 at Forari."
