= Melanesian Pidgin =

Group of related creoles of Melanesia

- Region: Melanesia
- Language family: English-based pidgin and English Creole: Pacific; Melanesian Pidgin
- Dialects: Bislama; Solomon Islands Pijin; Tok Pisin; Torres Strait Creole

Language codes
- ISO 639-3: Variously: bis – Bislama pis – Pijin tcs – Torres Strait Creole tpi – Tok Pisin
- Glottolog: earl1243
- IETF: cpe-054

Melanesian Pidgin or Neo-Melanesian language comprises four related English-derived languages of Melanesia:

- Bislama, of Vanuatu
- Solomon Islands Pidgin
- Tok Pisin, of Papua New Guinea
- Torres Strait Creole, of the Torres Strait Islands and parts of Cape York

Torres Strait Creole is the least closely related of the four, and is sometimes treated as separate from the other three.

These languages are based on a mixture of a substrate of Eastern Oceanic languages, and substrate of German (from the era of German New Guinea) and/or English (due to "blackbirding", where Melanesians were indentured to work on plantations in Queensland, Australia). Worldwide nautical jargon/pidgins have also contributed to the languages.

== See also ==
- Micronesian Pidgin English, spoken in nineteenth-century Micronesia
- Pidgin (disambiguation)
