= Velar fricative =

Type of fricative constant

A velar fricative is a fricative consonant produced at the velar place of articulation. It is possible to distinguish the following kinds of velar fricatives:

- Voiced velar fricative, a consonant sound written as ⟨ɣ⟩ in the International Phonetic Alphabet
- Voiceless velar fricative, a consonant sound written as ⟨x⟩ in the International Phonetic Alphabet
- Velar ejective fricative, a consonant sound written as ⟨xʼ⟩ in the International Phonetic Alphabet

These are not to be confused with velarized fricatives, like sˠ or ðˠ, where the velarization is a form of secondary articulation.
