= Tangbunia Bank =

Bank in Vanuatu

- Industry: Banking
- Key people: Chief Viraleo Boborenvanua, manager
- Products: Financial services

The Tangbunia Bank (widely misreported as Tari Bunia) is a bank run by the Turaga indigenous movement on Pentecost Island in Vanuatu. It is notable for dealing in items of customary wealth such as hand-woven mats, shells, or pig tusks rather than currency such as the vatu. Accounts at the bank are reckoned in livatu, a unit equivalent to the value of one fully curved boar's tusk.

== History ==
Following the independence of the New Hebrides in July 1980, due to the size of its economy, the newly independent Republic of Vanuatu was still economically dependent on foreign investments. Tangbunia Bank was set up by Chief Viraleo Boborenvanua who advocated for a return to the traditional barter system in contrast with Western capitalism. The bank accepts deposits in tusks, live pigs, dyed mats and other traditional Vanuatuan items of value in exchange for livatu. The national government supports for the indigenous customary economy, in a country where a majority of the population does not participate extensively in a monetary economy, but does not formally recognise the livatu as an acceptable currency, though an unofficial exchange rate was established. Record-keeping at the Tangbunia Bank is done using Avoiuli, a local writing system devised by Chief Viraleo.

According to the British Broadcasting Corporation, the bank is similar to other banks in that it has "accounts, reserves, cheque books and tight security" as well as offering 15% interest on savings. The Tangbunia Bank has fourteen branches throughout the island, with its headquarters at Lavatmanggemu. Chief Viraleo Boborenvanua remains as the bank's manager. The bank is named after the giant baskets in which valuables were traditionally stored.
