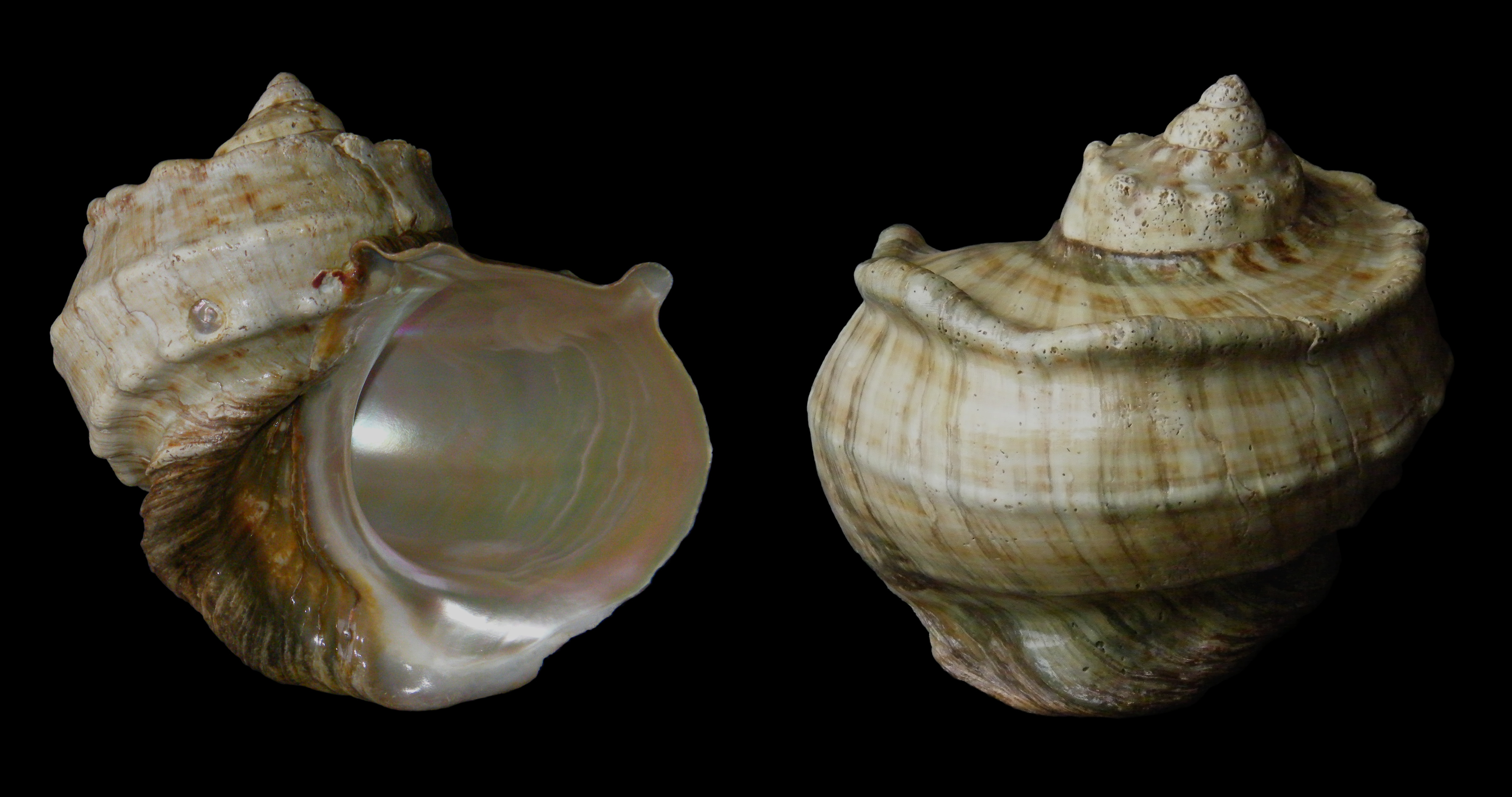
- Two views of a shell of Turbo marmoratus.

Scientific classification
- Kingdom: Animalia
- Phylum: Mollusca
- Class: Gastropoda
- Subclass: Vetigastropoda
- Order: Trochida
- Family: Turbinidae
- Genus: Turbo
- Species: T. marmoratus

Binomial name
- Turbo marmoratus Linnaeus, 1758

Synonyms
- Turbo cochlus Gmelin, 1791; Turbo olearius Linnaeus, 1758; Turbo regenfussi Deshayes, G.P., 1843; Turbo undulata Röding, 1798; Turbo (Lunatica) marmoratus Linnaeus, 1758

= Turbo marmoratus =

Species of gastropod

Turbo marmoratus, known as the green turban, the marbled turban or great green turban, is a large species of marine gastropod with a thick calcareous operculum in the family Turbinidae, the turban snails.

The shells of these large sea snails have a very thick layer of nacre; this species has been commercially fished as a source of mother of pearl.

== Distribution ==
These large snails live in tropical reefs in the Indian Ocean (off Tanzania, Madagascar, Aldabra and the Mascarene Basin) and tropical western Pacific oceans; also off Queensland, Australia. They are nocturnal and feed on algae. Specimens were found among oysters in Samish Bay, Washington in 1924, though it does not appear to have become established there. It was also deliberately introduced to Samoa and Tonga in the 1990's - but it is unclear if these populations became self-sustaining - and French Polynesia, where it provides an important fishery for food and shell products.

== Description ==
The distinctive shell grows to a length of 18 cm. The large, imperforate, solid shell is ventricose, as broad as long. Its color pattern is green, marbled with white and rich brown. The 6-7 whorls are flattened or concave above, rounded and bearing two nodose keels below, and a stronger nodose carina above. It bears blunt tubercles, especially strong on the shoulders. Its large, circular aperture has a golden, pearly shine. The base of the shell is produced. The columellar region is more or less excavated.

The subcircular operculum is somewhat concave within. Its outer surface is closely tuberculate and whitish.

Turbo marmoratus is the host of the ectoparasitic copepod Anthessius isamusi Uyeno & Nagasawa, 2012

== Uses ==
The shell of green turbans is used as a source of nacre. The large opercula of Turbo marmoratus have been sold as paperweights or door stops. Green turbans are also popular as food.
