= Raga language =

Austronesian language spoken in Vanuatu

Raga
- Hano
- Pronunciation: [raɣa]
- Native to: Vanuatu
- Region: Pentecost Island
- Native speakers: (6,500 cited 2001)
- Language family: Austronesian: Malayo-Polynesian; Oceanic; Southern Oceanic; North-Central Vanuatu; North Vanuatu; Raga
- Dialects: Ḡasai
- Writing system: Latin script Avoiuli

Language codes
- ISO 639-3: lml
- Glottolog: hano1246
- Raga is not endangered according to the classification system of the UNESCO Atlas of the World's Languages in Danger

Raga (also known as Hano) is the language of northern Pentecost Island in Vanuatu. Like all Vanuatu languages, Raga belongs to the Oceanic subgroup of the Austronesian languages family. In old sources the language is sometimes referred to by the names of villages in which it is spoken, such as Bwatvenua (Qatvenua), Lamalanga, Vunmarama and Loltong.

It is the most conservative language of Pentecost Island, having preserved final vowels while also retaining the five-vowel system inherited from Proto-Oceanic, compared to other languages spoken on the island, which have all developed additional vowels in addition to pervasive vowel deletion.

With an estimated 6,500 native speakers (in the year 2000), Raga is the second most widely spoken of Pentecost's five native languages (after Apma), and the seventh largest vernacular in Vanuatu as a whole. There are significant communities of Raga speakers on Maewo island and in Port Vila and Luganville as a result of emigration from Pentecost. Walter Lini, the independence leader of Vanuatu, was a native Raga speaker.

The Raga spoken by most people today is heavily mixed with Bislama, Vanuatu's national language. The Turaga indigenous movement, based at Lavatmanggemu in north-eastern Pentecost, have attempted to purge the language of foreign influences by coining or rediscovering native words for introduced concepts such as "torch battery" (vat bon̄bon̄i, literally "night stones") and "hour" (ḡuha, literally "movement"). Members of the Turaga movement write in Raga language using Avoiuli, a unique writing system inspired by local sand drawings.

Raga is generally considered an easy language to speak and learn, and is widely spoken as a second language by native speakers of other Vanuatu languages.

Modern Raga is relatively homogeneous, with no significant dialectal variation. A distinctive southern dialect of Raga, Ḡasai, is now extinct; its last native speaker died in 1999.

Several grammatical sketches, vocabulary lists and short papers on Raga have been published, beginning with the work of R H Codrington and von der Gabelentz in the late 19th century, and a number of religious texts have been translated into the language.

== Name ==
The name Raga refers to the native name of Pentecost Island in the language, which can appear with the locative marker a-, giving Araga. In Tamambo, spoken in Malo Island, a cognate form Araha refers to the same island. The name Hano literally means "what".

== Phonology ==
The consonants of Raga are as follows,

Raga consonants
		Labial		Alveolar	Velar	Glottal
		plain	labialized	Alveolar	Velar	Glottal
Nasal		m	mʷ ⟨mw⟩	n	ŋ ⟨n̄⟩	
Plosive	voiced	b ~ p ⟨b⟩	bʷ ⟨bw⟩	d	ᵑɡ ⟨ḡ⟩	
Plosive	voiceless			t	k	
Fricative		v ~ f ⟨v⟩	vʷ ~ fʷ ⟨vw⟩	s	ɣ ~ x ⟨g⟩	h
Rhotic				ɾ ⟨r⟩		
Sonorant			w	l		

The sounds /ŋ/ and /ᵑɡ/ (like the ng of 'singer' and 'finger', respectively), which are written n̄ and ḡ. G is typically pronounced like the ch in Scottish "loch".

Prenasalization of the voiced plosives, such that b becomes mb (always voiced) and d becomes nd, occurs when the preceding consonant is nasal (m, n or n̄). Thus mabu "rest" is pronounced mambu.

V, vw are labiodental, unlike in Apma to the immediate south, where they are bilabial [β, w]. Descriptions describe v as [v] and g as [x] more commonly than as [f] or [ɣ], but there is evidently some variation.

/ɾ/ can be in free variation with a trill [r].

Raga has the five basic vowels /i, e, a, o, u/. Vowels are not generally distinguished for length.

Word roots in Raga nearly always end with a vowel. However, word-final vowels are often dropped within phrases, so that, for example, tan̄a "basket" and maita "white" combine to make tan̄ maita "white basket".

Stress occurs on the penultimate syllable of a word.

== Grammar ==
Raga uses Nominative–accusative alignment. The basic word order in Raga is subject–verb–object.

=== Pronouns ===
Personal pronouns are distinguished by person and number. They are not distinguished by gender. The basic pronouns are as follows:

		Singular	Dual	Plural
1st person	inclusive	inau	gidaru	gida
1st person	exclusive	inau	kamaru	kamai
2nd person		giḡo	kimiru	kimiu
3rd person		kea	kera	

=== Nouns ===
Plurality is indicated by placing ira before a noun:

manu = [the] bird
ira manu = [the] birds

Nouns may be suffixed to indicate whom an item belongs to. For example:

iha = name
ihaku = my name
ihamwa = your name
ihana = his/her name
ihan ratahigi = the chief's name

Possession may also be indicated by the use of possessive classifiers, separate words that occur before the noun and take possessive suffixes. These classifiers are:

- no- for general possessions (noḡu tan̄a, "my basket")
- bila- for things that are cared for, such as crops and livestock (bilada boe, "our pig")
- ga- for things to be eaten (gam bweta, "your taro")
- ma- for things to be drunk (mara wai, "their water")

Historically there was also a classifier wa- for sugarcane to be chewed (wan toi, "his sugarcane"); this has fallen out of use among younger speakers.

The possessive suffixes are as follows:

		Singular	Dual	Plural
1st person	inclusive	-ku or -ḡu	-daru	-da
1st person	exclusive	-ku or -ḡu	-maru	-mai
2nd person		-mwa	-miru	-miu
3rd person		-na	-ra	
Generic		-i		

A verb may be transformed into a noun by the addition of a nominalising suffix -ana:

bwalo = to fight (verb)
bwaloana = a fight (noun)

Modifiers generally come after a noun:

vanua = island
vanua kolo = small island
vanua gairua = two islands

=== Verbs ===
Verbs in Raga are usually preceded by a subject pronoun and by a tense–aspect–mood marker.

The subject pronouns are as follows:

		Singular	Plural
1st person	inclusive	na-	ta-
1st person	exclusive	na-	ga-
2nd person		go-	gi-
3rd person			ra-

There is no 3rd person singular subject pronoun ("he/she/it").

Raga has five sets of tense–aspect–mood markers:

TAM	Used for	Marker (full form)	Marker (short form)
Imperfective	Actions in the present tense Temporary or changing states	mwa	-m
Perfective	Actions in the past tense Fixed states	nu	-n
Potential	Things that may happen in the future	vi	-v or -i
Prospective	Things that are about to happen	men	-men
Hypothetical	Things that have not happened and probably won't	si	-s

The full forms of these markers are used in the 3rd person singular, when there is usually no subject pronoun:

mwa lolia = he is doing it
nu lolia = he did it
vi lolia = he will do it

Elsewhere, short forms of these markers are suffixed to the subject pronoun:

nam lolia = I am doing it
nan lolia = I did it
nav lolia = I will do it

There are also dual (two-person) forms incorporating a particle ru "two":

ram lolia = they are doing it
ramuru lolia = the two of them are doing it

Historically there were trial (three-person) forms incorporating a particle dol or tol, but these have fallen out of use.

Imperatives can consist of a verb with no marker. In third person forms, there is a marker na-:

Mai teti! = Come here!
Ihamwa na sabuga = May your name be holy

There is a pattern of verb-consonant mutation whereby v at the start of a verb changes to b, vw to bw, g to ḡ, and t to d. This mutation occurs in imperfective aspect, and in the presence of the additive marker mom:

nan vano = I went
nam bano = I am going

Negative sentences are indicated with the two-part marker hav...te(he) "not", which encloses the verb and anything suffixed to it:

nan hav lolia tehe = I didn't do it

The passive voice can be formed by attaching the suffix -ana to the verb:

nu lolia = he did it
nu loliana = it was done

The direct object immediately follows the verb. Some object pronouns take the form of suffixes attached to the verb:

Person	Raga	English
1st person singular	-(a)u	"me"
2nd person singular	-go	"you" (singular)
3rd person singular (or inanimate plural)	-a or -e	"him" / "her" / "it" (or "them")
3rd person plural (animate)	-ra	"them"

In some cases a particle -ni- interposes between the verb and the object pronoun:

nam doronia = I like it

== Sample phrases ==
English	Raga
Where are you going?	Gomen van (hala) behe?
Where have you come from?	Gon mai (hala) behe?
Where is it?	Mwa ^{n}do (hala) behe?
It's here	Mwa ^{n}do teti
Come here!	Mai teti!
Go away!	Van dagai!
What's your name?	Ihamwa be ihei?
My name is...	Ihaku be...
Where are you from?	Giḡo ata behe? / Giḡo nin behe?
I am from...	Inau ata... / Inau nin...
How much? / How many?	Gaiviha?
one	tea / gaituvwa
two	(gai)rua
three	(gai)tolu
four	(gai)vasi
five	(gai)lima
six	(gai)ono
seven	(gai)bitu
eight	(gai)vwelu
nine	(gai)sivo
ten	han̄vulu
Thank you	Tabeana
It's just fine	Nu tavuha n̄ano
