= Bislama =

English-based creole language of Vanuatu

- Bichelamar, Bichlamar
- Bislama
- Signs in Bislama
- Pronunciation: /ˈbɪʃləmɑː/, /ˈbɪsləmɑː/ (in English); [bisˈlama] (in Bislama, prescribed), [biʃˈlama] (common)
- Native to: Vanuatu
- Region: Vanuatu
- Native speakers: 10,000 (2011); 200,000 L2 speakers
- Language family: English Creole: Pacific; Melanesian Pidgin; Bislama
- Writing system: Latin (officially, used overall); Avoiuli (only sporadically on Pentecost island)

Official status
- Official language in: Vanuatu

Language codes
- ISO 639-1: bi
- ISO 639-2: bis
- ISO 639-3: bis
- Glottolog: bisl1239
- ELP: VU
- Linguasphere: 52-ABB-ce

A Bislama speaker, recorded in Vanuatu

Bislama (English: /ˈbɪʃləmɑː/ or /ˈbɪsləmɑː/; Bislama: [bislama] (prescribed) or /biʃlama/ (common)), also known by its earlier French name, bichelamar ([biʃlamaʁ] or [biʃlama]), is an English-based creole language that is the national language of Vanuatu, and one of the three official languages of the country, the other two being English and French. Bislama is the first language of many of the "Urban ni-Vanuatu" (citizens who live in Port Vila and Luganville) and the second language of much of the rest of the country's residents. The lyrics of "Yumi, Yumi, Yumi", the country's national anthem, are composed in Bislama.

More than 95% of Bislama words are of English origin, whilst the remainder comprises a few dozen words from French as well as some specific vocabulary inherited from various languages of Vanuatu—although these are essentially limited to flora and fauna terminology. While the influence of these vernacular languages is low on the vocabulary side, it is very high in the morphosyntax. As such, Bislama can be described simply as a language with an English vocabulary and an Oceanic grammar and phonology.

Scholars highlight the role of Bislama in undermining the vitality of Vanuatu's indigenous languages.

== Name ==
In Bislama itself, the name of the language is officially pronounced /bislama/ in the official, standardized pronunciation, though the form /biʃlama/ (which better reflects the pronunciation of the previous French name, Bichelamar [biʃlamaʁ]), is commonly heard in different areas, including in the capital, Port Vila. In English, the standard pronunciation is given as /ˈbɪʃləmɑː/ or /ˈbɪsləmɑː/ depending on the source.

The language's previous name, Bichelamar, also previously spelled beach-la-mar, became popular in the early-19th century, from French biche de mer or bêche de mer, sea cucumber, itself an alteration of the Portuguese bicho do mar "sea animal". In the early 1840s, sea cucumbers were also harvested and dried at the same time that sandalwood was gathered. The names biche-la-mar and Sandalwood English came to be associated with the kind of pidgin that came to be used by the local laborers between themselves, as well as their English-speaking overseers.

Robert Louis Stevenson wrote in an account of his travels through the Pacific in 1888 and 1889, "the natives themselves have often scraped up a little English ... or an efficient pidgin, what is called to the westward Beach-la-Mar." In Jack London's story "Yah! Yah! Yah!", one of his "South Sea Tales", there is repeated a reference to "a silly lingo called bech-de-mer", and much of the story's dialogue is conducted in it.

Sign in Bislama in Port Vila, Vanuatu (2026)

Today, the word bislama itself is seldom used by speakers of Bislama to refer to sea cucumbers, as a new re-borrowing from pseudo-French bêche de mer, which has taken the form besdemea, has become more popular.

== History ==
Sign in Bislama at the city market put up by the City Council of Port Vila, Vanuatu

During the period of "blackbirding" in the 1870s and 1880s, hundreds of thousands of Pacific islanders (many of them from the New Hebrides – now the Vanuatu archipelago) were taken as indentured labourers, often kidnapped, and forced to work on plantations, mainly in Queensland, Australia, and Fiji. With several languages being spoken in these plantations a localised pidgin was formed, combining English vocabulary with grammatical structures typical of languages in the region. This early plantation pidgin is the origin not only of Bislama, but also of Tok Pisin in Papua New Guinea, and Pijin of the Solomon Islands; though not of Torres Strait Creole in the north of Australia.

This creole started spreading throughout the Vanuatu archipelago at the turn of the 20th century, as former blackbirds and their descendants began to return to their native islands. Knowledge of this creole would facilitate communication not only with European traders and settlers, but also between native populations, and because Vanuatu is the most language-dense country in the world (one count puts it at 113 languages for a population of 225,000), Bislama usefully serves as a lingua franca for communication between ni-Vanuatu, as well as with and between foreigners. Although it has been primarily a spoken-only language for most of its history, the first dictionary of Bislama was published in 1977. A new dictionary was published in 1995. This, along with its second edition in 2004, has helped to create a standardised and uniform spelling of written Bislama.

Besides Bislama, most ni-Vanuatu also know their local language, the local language of their father and/or mother, as well as their spouse, oftentimes. The country's official languages of tuition in schools and educational institutions are English and French.

== Dialectal variations ==
Dialects exist, primarily due to differences in pronunciation in different places under the influence of the surrounding indigenous languages' phonologies. For example, the future tense marker can be pronounced bambae, mbae, nambae or bae.

Preferences for using Bislama or indigenous vocabulary vary by location, although most individuals fill out Bislama with English, French or local vocabulary. In the capital city, computer or kompiuta is heard, although French-based ordinateur may be heard elsewhere.

== Pacific creole comparison ==
English	Bislama	Solomon Islands Pijin	Tok Pisin	Torres Strait Creole
and	mo	an	na	ane / ne / an / a
the	__ ia / ya	__ ia	dispela __	dha / dhemtu / dhem
this	__ ia / ya	__ ia	dispela __	dhis __ (ia) / dhemtu __ ia / dhem __ ia
he / she / it / him / her	hem	hem	em / en	em
for	from	fo	long	po
(adjective marker)	-fala	-fala	-pela	-Ø when attributive (em i big man 'he's a big man') -wan when predicative (man i bigwan 'the man's big')
woman	woman	woman / mere	meri	uman / oman (dialect difference)

== Orthography ==
The Bislama Latin alphabet uses the letters A, B, D, E, F, G, H, I, J, K, L, M, N, O, P, R, S, T, U, V, W, Y and the digraphs AE, AO and NG.

An older Latin orthography, used before 1995, had É (now written E), AI and AU (now AE and AO). For those vowels in hiatus, AÏ and AÜ were used (now written AI and AU). Labialized consonants (used in loanwords), now written with a tilde (M̃ and P̃) or a following W (MW and PW), were then spelled with a macron, following the conventions used for some vernacular Vanuatu languages: M̄ was used for /mʷ/ and P̄ for /pʷ/.

A sign in Bislama on Pentecost island, written in the Avoiuli script; the top-left reads: sab senta blong melenisian institiut blong tijim saen. filosofi. hiumaniti mo teknoloji. lisa vilij lolovini (Sap Centre of the Melanesian Institute for teaching science, philosophy, humanity and technology, Lisaa village, Central Pentecost).

On the island of Pentecost, the local avoiuli script, created to write the local Raga language, is sometimes used for writing Bislama. The shapes of the letters derive from sand-drawing. It has distinct letters for NG and NGG, but otherwise corresponds closely to the Latin alphabet above, though capitals are seldom used, punctuation differs, there are digits for higher numbers and logograms for commonly traded commodities such as pig tusks.

== Grammar ==
Two frequent words in Bislama are "long" and "blong", which take the place of many prepositions in English or French.

=== "Long" ===
- Long as 'next to', 'by', 'beside' etc.
  Stoa long haos
  The store next to the house.
- long as 'at' or 'to'
  Mi bin stap long ples ia bifo
  I have been to this place before.
  Mi stap long stoa
  I am at the store.
- long as 'in'
  Jea long haos
  The chair in the house.

Long holds many other related meanings, and is sometimes used in improvisation.

=== "Blong" ===
Originally from the English word "belong", blong takes the place of 'of' or the genitive case in other languages. Just like of in English, it is one of the most widely used and versatile words in the language, and can indicate possession, country of origin, defining characteristics, intention, and others.

Buk blong mi
The book that belongs to me, my book
Man blong Amerika
Man from America, American.
Hemi woman blong saiens
She is a woman of science, She is a scientist.
Man blong dring
Man of drinking i.e. a drinker

=== Verbs ===
Verbs in Bislama usually consist of a stem word (borrowed from English, French or indigenous languages); most transitive verbs add to this a transitive suffix.

The form of that suffix is /-em/, /-im/, or /-um/, depending on vowel harmony. If the last vowel of the verb's stem is either -u- or -i-, then that vowel will normally be copied into the transitive suffix – however, there are rare exceptions. For all other stem vowels, the transitive suffix has its default form /-em/:

Morphology of transitive verb endings
English	Bislama	
etymon	stem	verb
dig	dig-	digim
clean	klin-	klinim
kiss	kis-	kisim
put	put-	putum
pull	pul-	pulum
cook	kuk-	kukum
want	wand-	wandem
hear	har-	harem 'hear, feel'
tell	tal-	talem 'tell, say'
sell	sal-	salem
shut	sat-	sarem
catch	kas-	kasem 'get, reach'
carry	kar-	karem 'carry, bring'
ready	rere 'ready'	rerem 'prepare'
take	tek-	tekem
find	faen-	faenem
call	kol-	kolem
hold	hol-	holem
follow	fol-	folem
show	so-	soem
look out	lukaot-	lukaotem 'search'
pay	pe-	pem 'buy'

Exceptions exist, such as lukim ("look").

Examples of transitive verbs which exceptionally don't take this suffix include: kakae 'eat, bite'; trink 'drink'; save 'know'; se 'say'.

Verbs do not conjugate. The tense, aspect and mood of a sentence are indicated with markers such as stap, bin and bae that are placed in the sentence.

Mi stap kakae taro
I'm eating taro
Mi bin kakae taro
I have eaten taro
Bae mi kakae taro
I will eat taro

=== Nouns ===
The plural is formed by putting ol before the word. For example, bia 'beer'; ol bia = "beers". Ol comes from the English "all". When used with numbers, the singular form is used. 2 bia, 3 bia, etc.

=== Pronouns ===
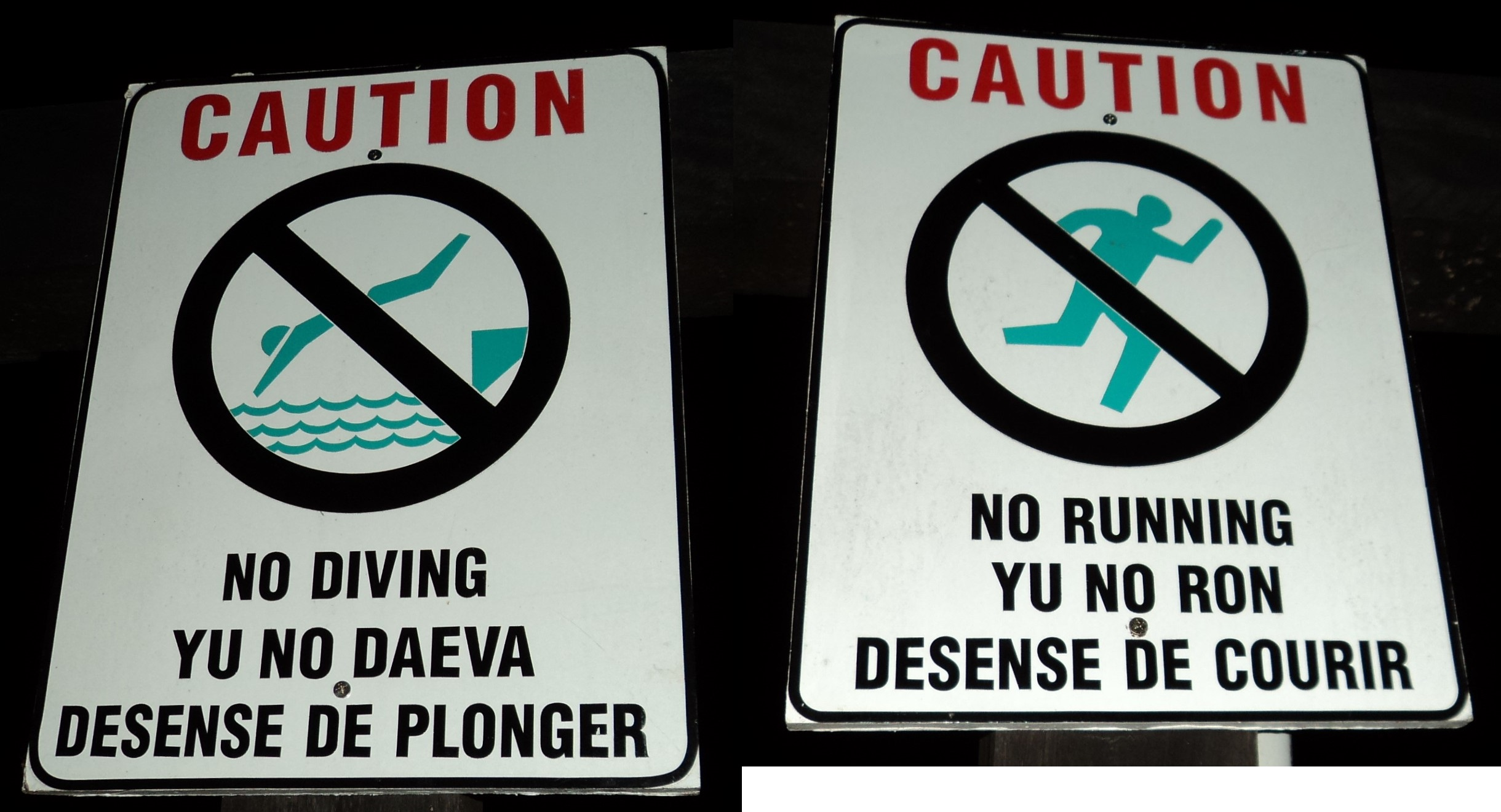
Pronouns on warning signs in Vanuatu

The personal pronouns of Bislama closely resemble those of Tok Pisin. They feature four grammatical numbers (singular, dual, trial and plural) and also encode the clusivity distinction: 1st person non-singular pronouns (equivalent of English we) are described as inclusive if they include the addressee (i.e. {you + I}, {you + I + others}), but exclusive otherwise (i.e. {I + other people}). Bislama pronouns do not decline.

personal pronouns of Bislama
		singular	dual	trial	plural
1st person	inclusive	–	yumitu	yumitri	yumi
1st person	exclusive	mi	mitufala	mitrifala	mifala
2nd person		yu	yutufala	yutrifala	yufala
3rd person		hem em	tufala tugeta	trifala trigeta	ol olgeta

The third person singular hem, also written em lacks gender distinction, so it can mean either he, she or it. The predicate marker i – a particle which is placed before the verbal phrase of a sentence – is sometimes merged with the third person pronoun, giving the words hemi and emi, respectively, in singular, and oli in plural.

=== Tense/aspect/mood markers ===
- stap + V : (progressive) ongoing or habitual action
  hem i stap kukum kumala
  or:

hemi stap kukum kumala
he/she is cooking sweet potatoes

- bin + V : past tense (with implication that the state is no longer true)
  hem i bin sik long fiva
  she was sick with fever [but is no longer sick]
- V + finis : (perfective) "already" (when placed at the end of a phrase; elsewhere it means "finish")
  hem i kakae finis
  she has already eaten
- bae + V (occasionally bambae): (irrealis) future or hypothetical actions (though, like in English, generally not used in conditional sentences)
  bae mi go long Santo
  I will go to Santo
  sipos plen i no bin fulap, bae mi go long Santo
  If the plane hadn't been full, I would have gone to Santo
- no + V : negative, "not"
  hem i no wantem yam
  he doesn't want yam
- nomo + V: "no longer" (when placed after the predicate; elsewhere it means "only")
  hem i nomo kakae yam
  he no longer eats yam
  hem i kakae yam nomo
  he only eats yam
- neva + V : never
  hem i neva kakae yam
  he's never eaten yam
- jes + V : (<"just") an action that has recently occurred
  mifala i jes wekap
  we just woke up
- In a future context, jes entails a delay, rendered in English as "eventually":
  bae mi pem
  I will buy it / Let me buy it
  bae mi jes pem, be noyet
  I will buy it (eventually), but not yet
- V + gogo : continued action
  hem i kukum kumala gogo
  he keeps on cooking sweet potatoes
- mas + V : "must", be obliged to
  hem i mas kakae
  he must eat
- traem + V : "try to"; also sometimes used for politeness in requests
  hem i stap traem katem
  he's trying to cut it
  traem soem long mi
  could you show it me? (request)
- wantem + V : "want to"
  hem i wantem go long Santo
  she wants to go to Santo
- save + V : be able to, or be in the habit of doing
  mi save rid
  I can read
  mi no save dring suga
  I don't take sugar in drinks
  fish ia i save kilim man
  this fish can kill a person

Some of these markers also have lexical meanings. For example, save can mean "be able to" but it is also a verb "know".

=== Subordination ===
- sapos + Clause : if

sapos yumitu faenem pig, bae yumitu kilim i ded
if we find a pig, we'll kill it

== Sample texts and media ==
=== The Bible ===
The longest written work in Bislama is the Bible completed in 1998.

Luke 2:6–7:
Bislama:

"Tufala i stap yet long Betlehem, nao i kam kasem stret taem blong Meri i bonem pikinini. Nao hem i bonem fasbon pikinini blong hem we hem i boe. Hem i kavremap gud long kaliko, nao i putum hem i slip long wan bokis we oltaim ol man ol i stap putum gras long hem, blong ol anamol ol i kakae. Tufala i mekem olsem, from we long hotel, i no gat ples blong tufala i stap."

English:

While they were still in Bethlehem, the time came for Mary to give birth. Then she gave birth to her firstborn, a son. She wrapped him in cloths and placed him in a manger (lit. "a certain kind of box where people used to put hay for animals to eat"). They did so, because there was no room in the inn for them to stay.

Recruitment advert from Vanuatu Tourism Office (2022)

=== Yumi, Yumi, Yumi ===
Bislama words

CHORUS:
Yumi, Yumi, yumi i glad long talem se
Yumi, yumi, yumi ol man blong Vanuatu

God i givim ples ya long yumi,
Yumi glat tumas long hem,
Yumi strong mo yumi fri long hem,
Yumi brata evriwan!

CHORUS

Plante fasin blong bifo i stap,
Plante fasin blong tedei,
Be yumi i olsem wan nomo,
Hemia fasin blong yumi!

CHORUS

Yumi save plante wok i stap,
Long ol aelan blong yumi,
God i helpem yumi evriwan,
Hem i papa blong yumi.

CHORUS

English translation

CHORUS:
We are, we are, we are happy to proclaim
We are, we are, we are the people of Vanuatu!

God has given us this land;
We are grateful for it,
We are strong, we are free in this land;
We are all brothers!

CHORUS

We have many traditions
And also many modern ways,
But we are all one
And this is who we are.

CHORUS

We know there is much work to be done
On all our islands.
God helps all of us,
He is our Father.

CHORUS
