= Vietnamese people in Vanuatu =

Vanuatu has a small, but significant, Vietnamese community. There are an estimated 1,000-2,000 people of Vietnamese descent, about 500 of whom are immigrants, making Vietnamese the second-largest group of foreigners in Vanuatu.

== History ==
The Vietnamese population in Vanuatu has its origins during the French colonization of Vanuatu, under which it was known as the New Hebrides. During the 1920s and 1930s, the French recruited laborers from Vietnam, especially the provinces of Ninh Bình, Nam Định, and Thái Bình in the Red River Delta area, which at the time was facing poverty and famine, to work on plantations in Vanuatu. Between 1921 and 1940, over 21,000 Vietnamese were recruited to Vanuatu, and made up about 10% of the population in 1929.

After the end of the Second World War, the French liquidated all labor contracts, and as the Vietnamese workers were freed from their status as indentured workers many demanded to return to Vietnam. After two repatriations to Vietnam in the 1950s and 1960s, much of the Vietnamese community had returned to Vietnam, although a significant community remains, consisting of older immigrants to the New Hebrides who chose to remain, recent immigrants to Vanuatu from Vietnam, and people of mixed Vietnamese and ni-Vanuatu descent.

== Notable people ==
Gilbert Dinh Van Than, ni-Vanuatu businessman and politician
