= A. J. Hackett =

New Zealand entrepreneur and bungee jumper

A. J. Hackett ONZM
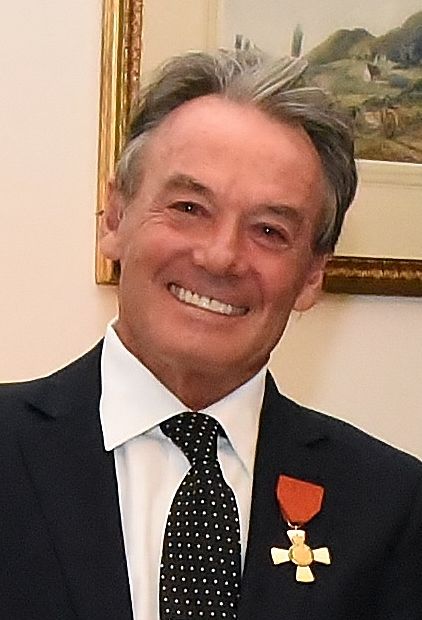
- Hackett in 2017
- Born: Allan John Hackett; May 1958 (age 68); Pukekohe, New Zealand
- Occupation: Entrepreneur
- Known for: Commercialisation of bungy jumping
- Relatives: Margaux Hackett (daughter)

Allan John "A. J." Hackett ONZM (born May 1958) is a New Zealand entrepreneur who popularised the extreme sport of bungy jumping. He made a bungy jump from the Eiffel Tower in 1987 and founded the first commercial bungy site in 1988. His daughter is freestyle skier, Margaux Hackett.

== Early life ==
Hackett was born in Pukekohe, and grew up on Auckland's North Shore. He attended Westlake Boys High School between 1972 and 1974, where he played rugby union. He left school at the age of sixteen to serve an apprenticeship as a carpenter-joiner. During this time he took up snowboarding and skiing. He moved to Perth where he sold encyclopaedias for four months, later returning to New Zealand to set up a construction business.

== Bungy jumping ==
Inspired by the Vanuatu ritual called land diving and the Oxford University Dangerous Sports Club experimental jumps in the 1970s, Hackett and fellow adventurer Chris Sigglekow, sought ways to make bungy jumping safe. Using a mathematical formula developed by New Zealand's Department of Scientific and Industrial Research, he created a super-stretchy elastic bungy cord in the mid-1980s.

In November 1986, Hackett, along with Sigglekow, performed his first amateur bungy jump from the Upper Harbour Bridge (Greenhithe Bridge) in Auckland, citing it as "one of the most riveting experiences of my life." Following this Hackett made jumps from a bridge in Auckland, the Auckland Harbour Bridge and other bridges in the North Island. These first jumps were made using a parachute harness; however, Hackett created a method where the harness was tied to the ankle and demonstrated its use by jumping off the Auckland Harbour Bridge a second time.

Hackett travelled to Paris in 1986 as part of the New Zealand Speed Skiing Team. While there he jumped off the 147 metres (482 ft) Pont de la Caille and a cable car at the Tignes ski resort. He made what became a famous bungy jump off the Eiffel Tower in Paris on 26 June 1987, receiving a brief jail sentence for the illegal feat and generating international attention to the sport.

Back in New Zealand, Hackett launched his own company, AJ Hackett Bungy, and created a site on the Kawarau Gorge Suspension Bridge in Queenstown in 1988 to become the world's first commercial public bungy. He later expanded his company by founding bungy sites in Australia, France (Souleuvre Viaduct in Normandy), Germany, the United States, Mexico, Indonesia, and Macau. He is credited with launching New Zealand's adventure tourism industry and helping to develop a safe code of operation for bungy jumping in use internationally. Hackett initially partnered with Henry van Asch, but the two split in 1997 with van Asch taking over the New Zealand-based business.

In 2006 Hackett published his autobiography, Jump Start, which chronicles his bungy jumping adventures.

=== Records and accomplishments ===
Hackett is widely known for his many bungy stunts that have earned him Guinness records and personal milestones, including:

- 1988: Jumping off the Auckland Stock Exchanges Tower, claiming the title as being the world's first bungy off a building
- 1990: Jumping 380 metres (1,250 ft) out of a helicopter for the first time
- 2000: Jumping off the Royal Gorge Bridge, also known as the highest suspension bridge in the world
- 2006: Opening and jumping out of the Macau Tower in Macao measuring 233 metres (764 ft) above ground and holding the title as the highest commercial bungy
- 2007: Doubling the previous record of 700 metres (2,300 ft) out of a helicopter with 1,499.6 metres in Malaysia with his new bungy technology allowing bungy stretches of over 1 kilometre

On 6 November 2007, Hackett was honoured by New Zealand television show This Is Your Life.

His company, AJ Hackett Bungy, was recognised by Westpac Queenstown Chamber of Commerce with a Business Excellence Award in the large business category.

In the 2017 Queen's Birthday Honours, Hackett was appointed an Officer of the New Zealand Order of Merit for services to adventure tourism.
