= Bunlap =

- Village
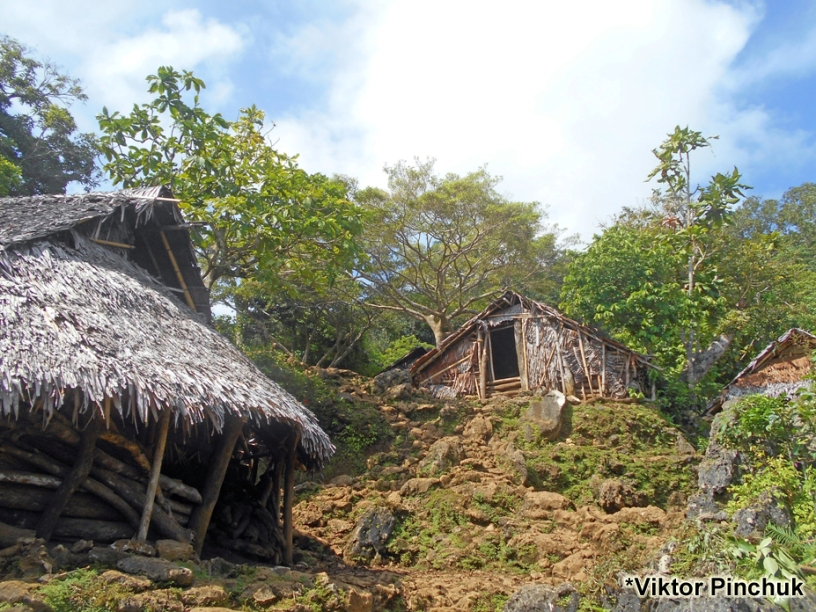
- Bunlap, January 2019

- Location in Vanuatu
- Coordinates: 15°58′S 168°16′E
- Country: Vanuatu
- Province: Penama Province
- Island: Pentecost Island
- Time zone: UTC+11 (VUT)

Bunlap is a village in the south-east of Pentecost Island in the Pacific archipelago of Vanuatu. It is the most well-known of a number of local kastom (custom) villages whose people aspire to retain a traditional lifestyle with minimal Western influences.

Unlike some other kastom villages, which remain strictly closed off to foreigners, Bunlap has profited extensively from tourism in recent years.

== Culture ==
=== Clothing ===
Traditional clothing is still worn by many (though not all) villagers. For females this consists of knee-length skirts made out of fiber strips. For ceremonial occasions, ankle-length skirts are worn. Men wear only a wide belt around the waist, to which a cloth or leaf tube is attached. The tube is worn around the penis (reminiscent of a penile gourd), while the remainder of the genitals and buttocks are exposed. These garments are distinct from the similar, but still differing nambas, which are worn by other indigenous peoples of Vanuatu.

Villagers from Bunlap generally put on Western clothing when travelling outside the area.

=== "Gol" ===
The Bunlap people perform an ancient ritual called the Gol (Bislama nanggol) or "land diving", in which men tie vines to their ankles and jump headfirst from platforms jutting out from a tower. The jumper's fall is broken by the vines, the other end of which is tied to the tower. A sloping surface of softened earth at the base of the tower provides some protection from injury in case of a broken vine, a vine of incorrect length, or a poor jump. The Gol inspired the modern sport of bungee jumping, though the vines used are far less elastic than bungee cords, and the Gol jumper does not bounce up at the end of the fall. The Gol legend says that in the village Bunlap a man called Tamalie had a quarrel with his wife and she ran away and climbed a banyan tree, where she wrapped her ankles with liana vines. When Tamalie came up to her, the woman jumped from the tree and so did her husband not knowing what his wife had done. He died but the woman survived. The men of Bunlap were very impressed by this performance and they began to practise such jumps in case they got in a similar situation. This practice transformed into a ritual for rich yam harvest and also for proving manhood.

=== Agriculture and cultivation ===
On the interior slopes of the island, villagers grow taro, a widely cultivated tropical Asian plant (Colocasia esculenta) having broad peltate leaves and a large starchy edible tuber.

Bunlap men often consume kava extract at the end of the day for its intoxicating effects, similar to alcohol. The drink is extracted from root of the kava plant. Women are forbidden to consume kava.

=== Rites of passage ===
The young boys of this tribe are circumcised at the age of 5 with a knife made of bamboo. The wound is then wrapped with a special leaf to make it heal faster. The men celebrate after the circumcising ceremony by eating a special pie made of yam and coconut and baking it on hot stones. After 7 weeks of solitude, the boys are let out and another big ceremony is organised. The boys who are circumcised take a further step to the manhood by killing each pig in the ceremony.

== Language ==
The people of Bunlap speak a slightly-distinctive form of Sa language. Bunlap's dialect appears to be largely a mixture of the dialects spoken in Panngi to the west, Baie Barrier to the north and Ranwas to the south. Anthropologists Margaret Jolly and Murray Garde have both spent time in Bunlap and acquired knowledge of its language.

Bislama, Vanuatu's national language, is known to some degree by most adult men in Bunlap, although knowledge and use of Bislama among inhabitants of Bunlap is far less than in nearby Christianised villages.

There is no Western schooling in Bunlap, and many (though not all) of its inhabitants are illiterate.

== In popular culture ==
The Travel Channel documentary series Tribal Life follows the Bunlap community members.
