= Zhengzhou Ostrich Park =

Ostrich farm in Zhengzhou, China

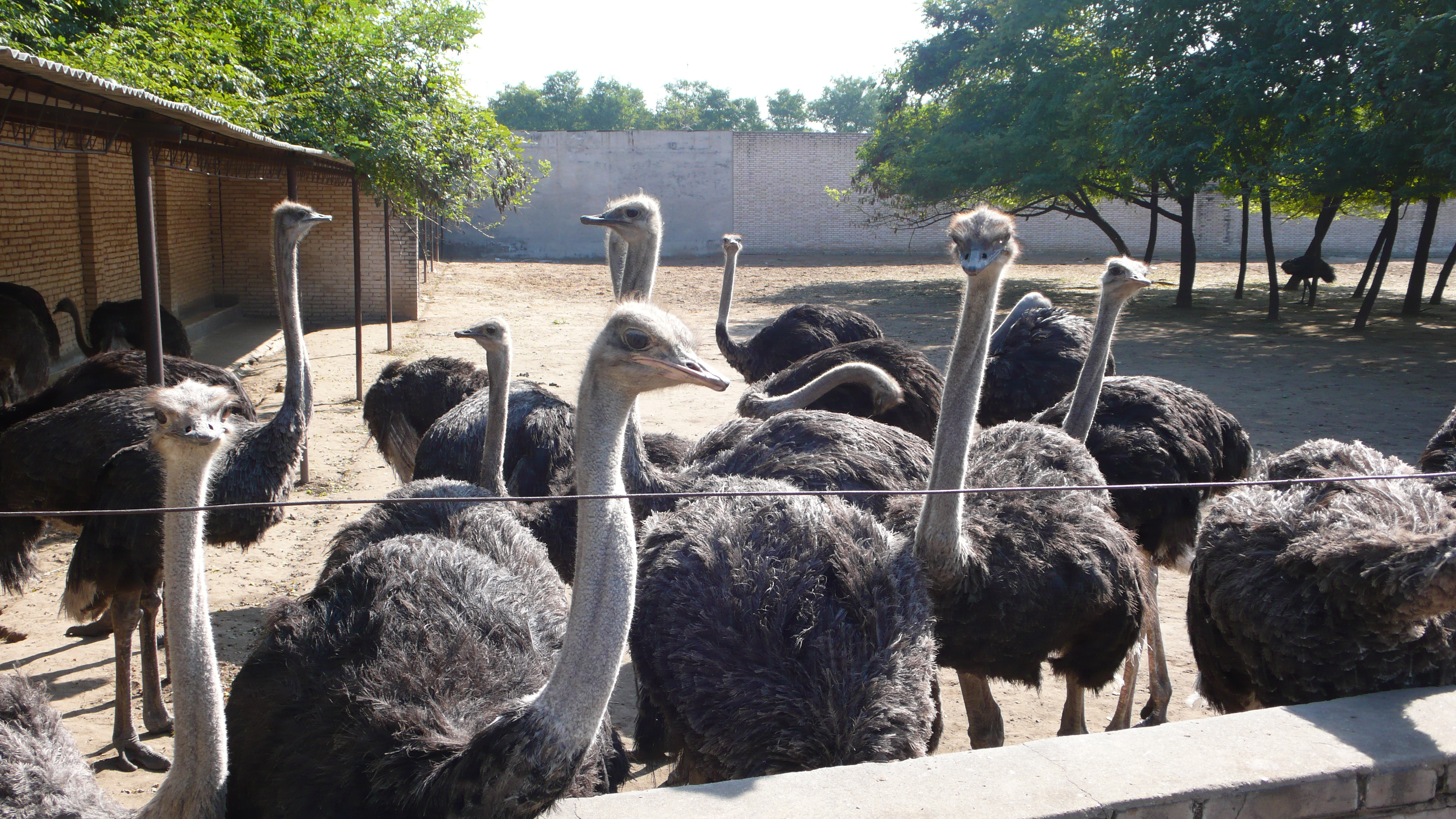

The Zhengzhou Ostrich Park is an ostrich farm, founded on December 18, 1997, engaging in breeding and production, with a recreation park area. The area of this park is more than 1420 mu, which is the largest breeding base for ostrich. It is located in the east development zone of Zhengzhou in Henan Province.

== History ==
On March 29, 1998, the Henan General Supply and Marketing Cooperative Department invested more than 10 million RMB to import 240 African Black Ostriches. This park that has the largest population of ostrich in Asia. At that time, Zhengzhou Ostrich Park mainly cultivated ostriches to produce large amount of ostrich meat and eggs to satisfy the market demand. Later in 2004, due to the high aesthetic value of the ostrich, the park was opened to the public as to promote eco-tourism. Recreation facilities, such as the racetrack, grass skating court and the aerial cable wapway were constructed.

== Facilities and activities ==
There is a labyrinth in the centre of the ostrich park, as well as an aerial wapway, artificial lake and water park; rock climbing, and bungee jumping activities can be done in the park. Games are held by the park every weekend, such as boating and climbing.
