= Aspiring Adventures =

New Zealand travel company

Aspiring Adventures is an adventure travel company with operations in South America (specifically, Peru, Ecuador, Colombia, Bolivia, and Patagonia), New Zealand, Australia, and Vanuatu.

The company offers trips centered on hiking, biking, and kayaking, as well as cultural events and local food.

== History ==
Aspiring Adventures was established by Steve Wilson (from New Zealand) and Katy Shorthouse (from Australia), who started working together in the adventure travel industry in 2005. The company organizes itineraries which include cultural events, such as the Inti Raymi festival in Peru, and the Naghol land diving ceremony of Pentecost Island, Vanuatu.

The company head office is located in Dunedin, New Zealand, and has satellite offices in Lima, Peru, Melbourne, Australia, and Rothenburg ob der Tauber, Germany.

In 2009, Aspiring Adventures created their first mountain biking trips on the Inca Trails in Peru.

In 2014, Aspiring Adventures was selected as having one of the world's 50 Best Guided Expeditions by National Geographic Traveler magazine. In 2015, the magazine listed the company's Quyllur Rit'i tour as one of the best in Central and South America.

In 2020 during the COVID-19 pandemic, Aspiring Adventures created "cooee", an online platform for personalised virtual tours, after international travel was suspended.
