= Macau Tower =

Observation tower in Macau

Macau Tower Convention and Entertainment Center (Macau Tower)
- 澳門旅遊塔會展娛樂中心; Centro de Convenções e Entretenimento da Torre de Macau
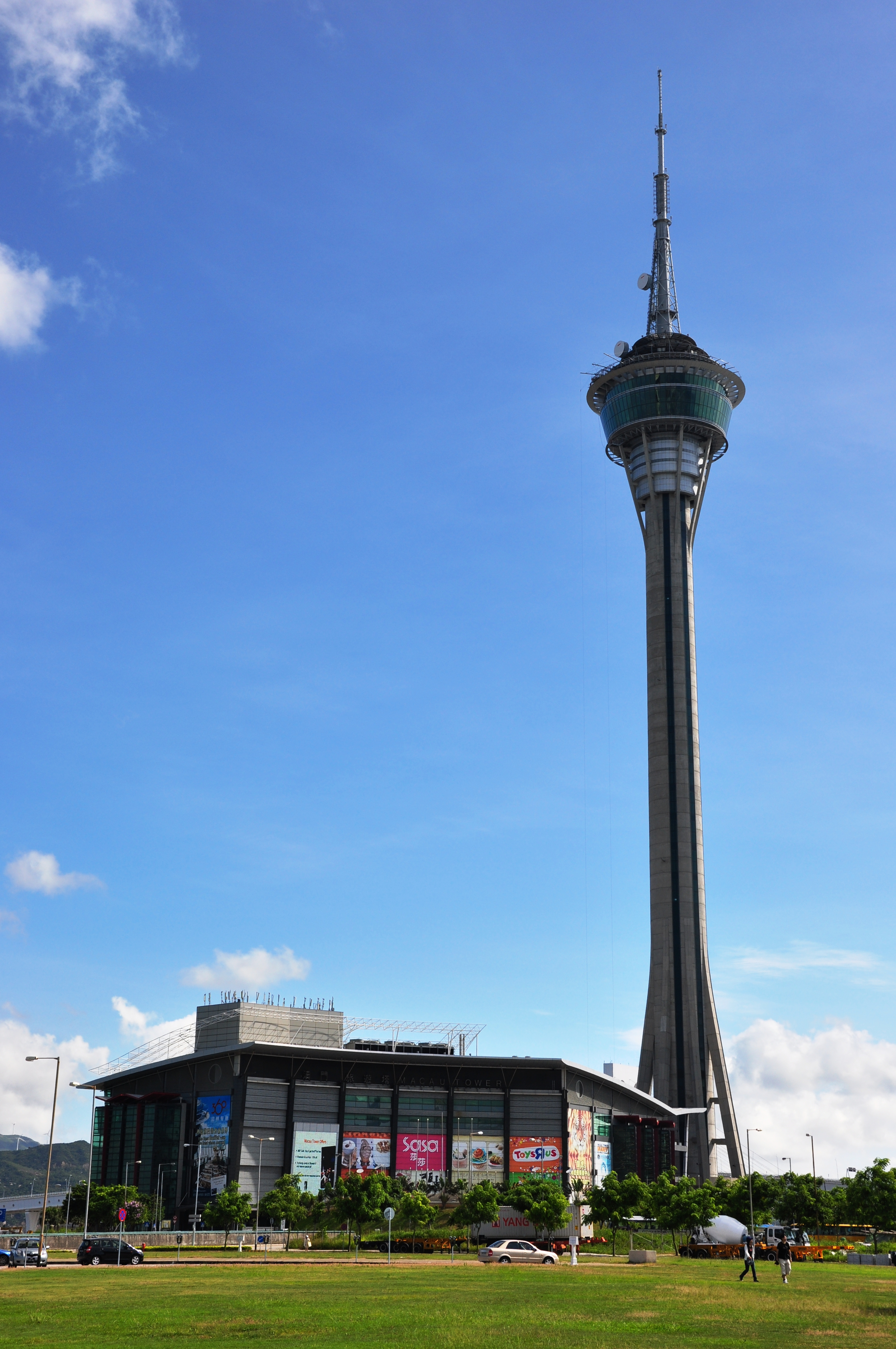
- View underneath Macau Tower showing the outer rim.
- Interactive map of the Macau Tower Convention and Entertainment Center (Macau Tower) area

General information
- Type: Communications, mixed use
- Location: Sé, Macau
- Coordinates: 22°10′47″N 113°32′12″E
- Construction started: 1998
- Completed: 2001
- Opening: December 19, 2001
- Cost: 1.2 billion patacas
- Owner: Sociedade de Turismo e Diversões de Macau, S.A.R.L. (STDM)
- Operator: Shun Holdings

Height
- Antenna spire: 338 m (1,108.9 ft)
- Roof: 248 m (813.6 ft)
- Top floor: 223 m (731.6 ft)

Technical details
- Floor count: 63 Equivalent
- Lifts/elevators: 4

Design and construction
- Architect: Craig Craig Moller Ltd.
- Structural engineer: Beca Carter Hollings & Ferner Ltd.

Macau Tower Convention and Entertainment Center (Macau Tower)

Chinese name
- Traditional Chinese: 澳門旅遊塔會展娛樂中心
- Simplified Chinese: 澳门旅游塔会展娱乐中心
Transcriptions
Standard Mandarin
- Hanyu Pinyin: Àomén Lǚyóutǎ Huìzhǎn Yúlèzhōngxīn
Yue: Cantonese
- Jyutping: ou3 mun4*2 leoi5 jau4 taap3 wui5 zin2 jyu4 lok6 zung1 sam1

Portuguese name
- Portuguese: Centro de Convenções e Entretenimento da Torre de Macau

The Macau Tower Convention and Entertainment Center (Chinese: 澳門旅遊塔會展娛樂中心; Portuguese: Centro de Convenções e Entretenimento da Torre de Macau), also known as the Macau Tower (Chinese: 澳門塔; Jyutping: ou3 mun4*2 taap3; Portuguese: Torre de Macau), is a tower located in Sé, Macau. The tower stands 338 m (1,109 ft) high, from ground level to the highest point. Its observation deck provides views, restaurants, theaters, shopping malls, and the Skywalk X—a walking tour around the outer rim. It offers the best view of Macau and has been used for a variety of adventurous activities.

At 233 m (764 ft) high, the Macau Tower's tethered "skyjump" and bungee jump (by A. J. Hackett) from the tower's outer rim is the highest commercial skyjump in the world, as well as the second-highest commercial decelerator descent facility in the world—after The Strat's SkyJump Las Vegas (at 252 m (827 ft) high).

The Macau Tower was created by Moller Architects and is one of the members of the World Federation of Great Towers. In addition to observation and entertainment, the tower is also used for telecommunications and broadcasting. It and the Grand Lisboa hotel are the most recognizable landmarks of the Macau skyline.

== History ==
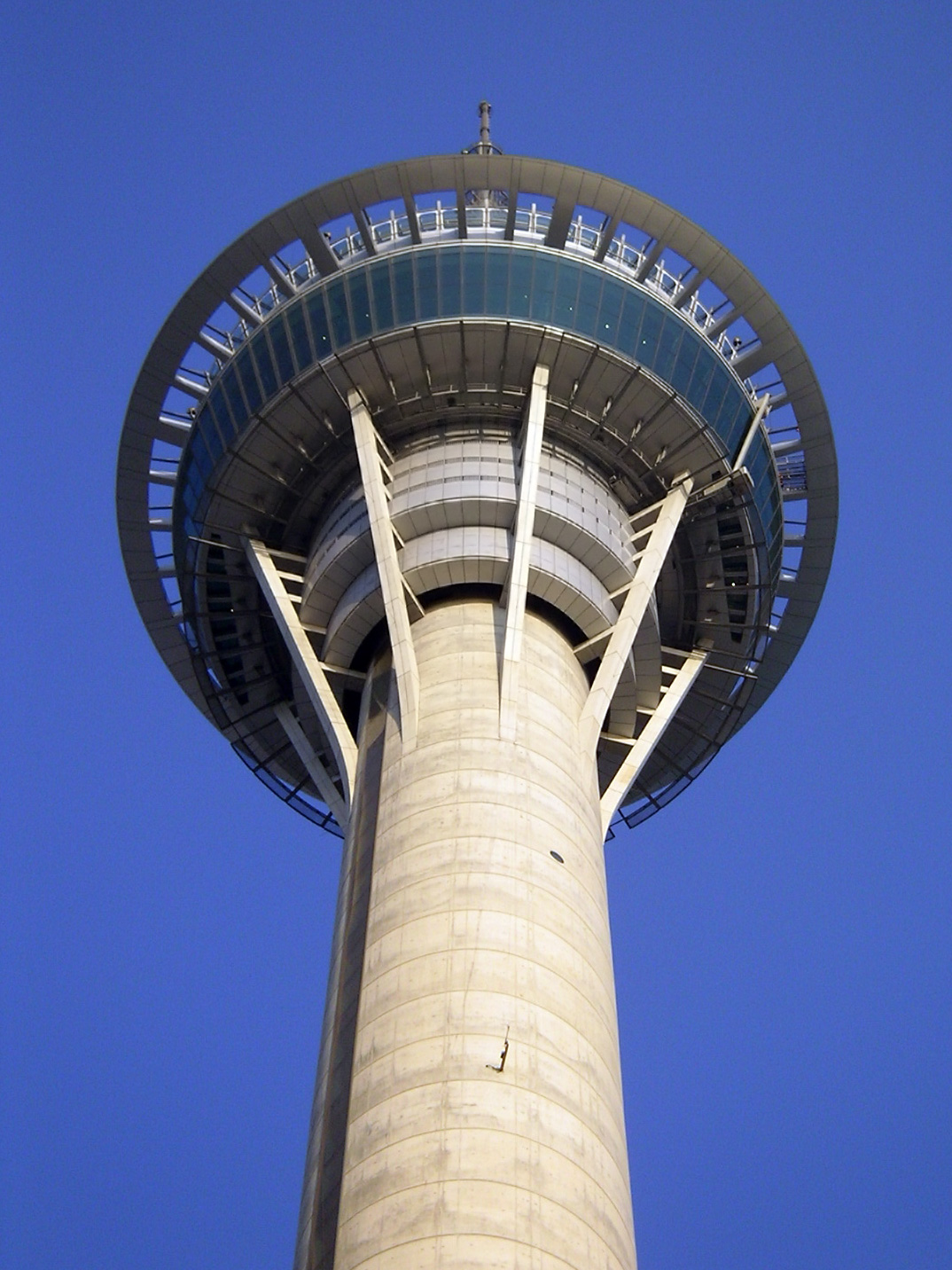
Macau Tower

On a visit to Auckland, New Zealand, Macau casino billionaire Stanley Ho Hung-Sun was so impressed by the Sky Tower in Auckland that he commissioned a similar one to be built in Macau. The tower was designed by Gordon Moller and engineered by New Zealand firm Beca Group for Sociedade de Turismo e Diversões de Macau. Construction work of the tower started in 1998, and the tower was officially opened on December 19, 2001. The architect for the tower was Les Dykstra. The Macau Tower's construction cost US$130 million. Construction of the Macau Tower was part of the US$1 billion Nam Van land reclamation project which transformed the Praia Grande neighborhood. The land reclamation project added 130 hectares of additional land and increased the overall size of the Macau peninsula by 20%.

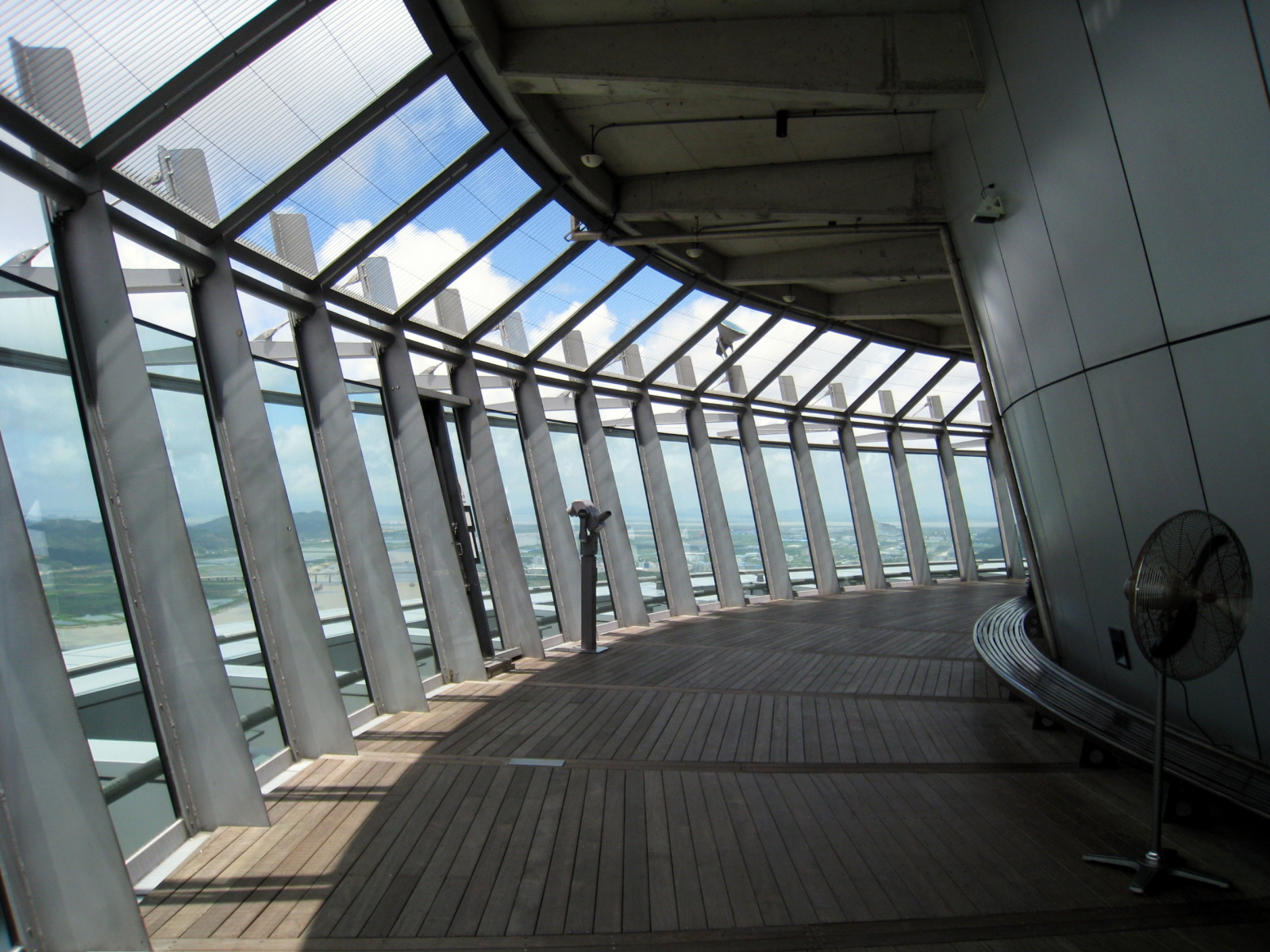
61°F Outdoor Observation Deck

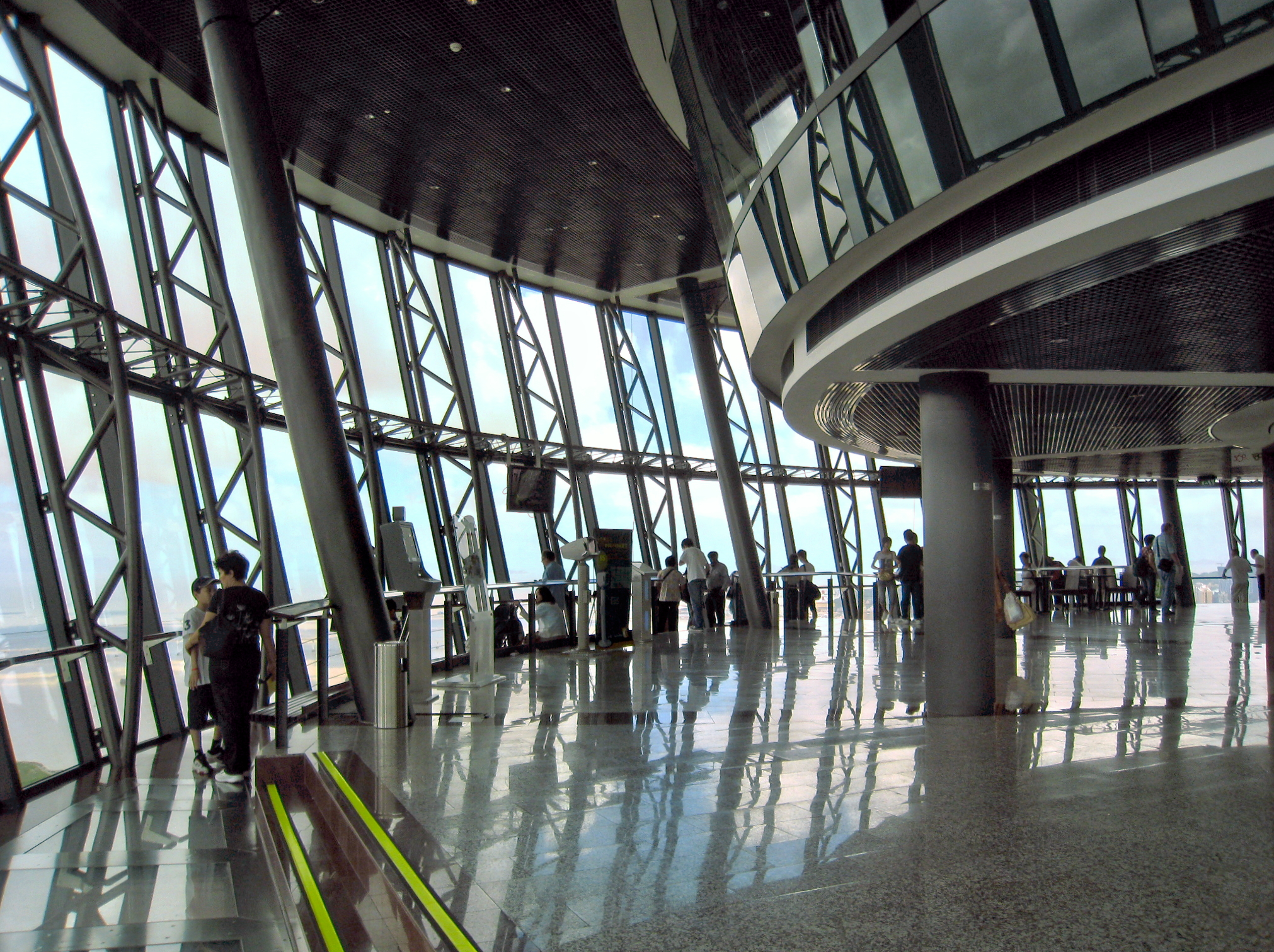
58°F Observation Deck

== Bungee jumping ==
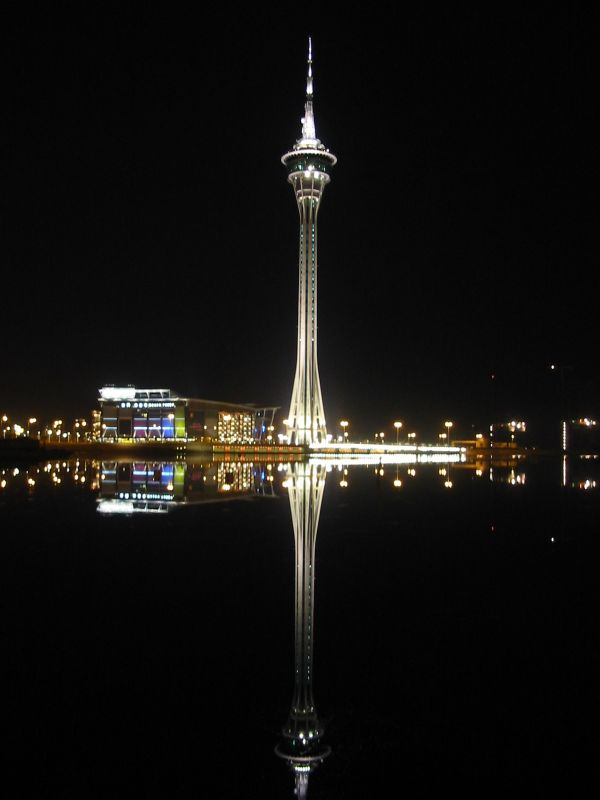
The tower is also home to several stores and a movie theater.

The tower has routinely been used as a site for staged bungee jumping events, by professional jumpers or as part of entertainment shows.

On December 17, 2006, the father of contemporary bungee jumping, A J Hackett, and popular artist Edison Chen broke two Guinness World Records at the Macau Tower. A J Hackett, broke his own Guinness World Record of "The Highest Bungee Jump from a Building" achieved in 1987 from the Eiffel Tower. Edison Chen represented Macau Tower in the inaugural jump to bid for "The World's Highest Bungee Jump Facility".

Jack Osbourne bungee-jumped off the tower as part of the third series of Jack Osbourne: Adrenaline Junkie. Anthony Bourdain bungee-jumped from the top floor of the building in an episode of Anthony Bourdain: No Reservations. It was also used on the Chinese variety show Up Idol (season 2) for episode 1. The two team captains, Wang Han and Yuan Hong, with their members, were given a mission - sky relay - to be completed on the tower as short a time as possible. Yuan Hong's team won the game, and Wang Han's team was given the punishment of bungee-jumping from the Tower. The jump was carried out by team members Xie Na and Joe Chen.

== In popular culture ==
The tower served as the venue of photoshoot of Episode 10, America's Next Top Model Cycle 18: British Invasion. In a 2018 Instagram post, contestant Annaliese Dayes revealed that during the photoshoot in the girls experienced “hail stones and gail force winds at 388 meters (1,273 ft) above the ground”. She also revealed that the weather was so bad, that the tower was closed “to the public due to the treacherous weather”.

It was also featured in the third episode of An Idiot Abroad 3, with Karl Pilkington and Warwick Davis walking around the perimeter of one of the highest floors and Davis undertaking a controlled descent to the ground.

It was used on the South Korean variety show Running Man for episode 133. The cast (not including Kim Jongkook) and their guests, Lee Dong-wook and Han Hye-jin, were given three missions - sky jump, mast climb, and sky walk - to be completed on the tower to acquire the three characters they needed to continue onto the next mission.

The tower was the site of a "Roadblock" task in an episode of American version of The Amazing Race: All-Stars that originally aired on April 22, 2007, on CBS as well as a Roadblock on The Amazing Race Canada 2 in 2014. The tower also appeared in one Roadblock each on two episodes of The Amazing Race Asia 3.

== See also ==
- List of towers
- List of tallest freestanding structures in the world
- Sky Tower (Auckland)
