= David Kirke (sportsperson) =

British sportsperson

David Antony Christopher Potter, known as David Kirke, (26 September 1945 – 21 October 2023) was a British sportsperson.

== Early life and education ==
Born on 26 September 1945 in Shawbury, Shropshire, Kirke was the eldest of seven children of Arnold Potter, a schoolmaster, and Fraye (Kirke) Potter, a concert pianist. He adopted his mother's maiden name as his surname during his time at the University of Oxford. He studied psychology and philosophy at Corpus Christi College, Oxford. Following university, he worked in publishing and edited a poetry journal.

== Career ==
Kirke's notable contribution to extreme sports was initiating what is considered the first modern bungee jump in 1979, off the Clifton Suspension Bridge in Bristol, England. This event drew inspiration from the land diving ritual of Vanuatu and involved an elastic rope used in military applications.

In the late 1970s, Kirke co-founded the Dangerous Sports Club at Oxford. The club became known for its involvement in high-risk activities. The idea for the Dangerous Sports Club reportedly emerged during a trip to the Swiss Alps with Chris Baker, a British department-store heir, where they discussed the concept of exploring new extreme sports. His activities with the Dangerous Sports Club often combined elements of extreme sports and performance art. These included unconventional stunts such as skiing with a carousel horse in the Swiss Alps, flying an inflatable kangaroo suspended by balloons over the English Channel, skateboarding in Pamplona's running of the bulls, and organizing a meal on the rim of an active volcano in Saint Vincent.

== Personal life ==
Kirke's personal life experienced a significant shift after the death of his girlfriend in a bus accident, leading him to leave his job and return to Oxford. This change marked his entry into a lifestyle characterized by adventurous and often perilous endeavors.
