= Souleuvre Viaduct =

Railway viaduct in Normandy, France

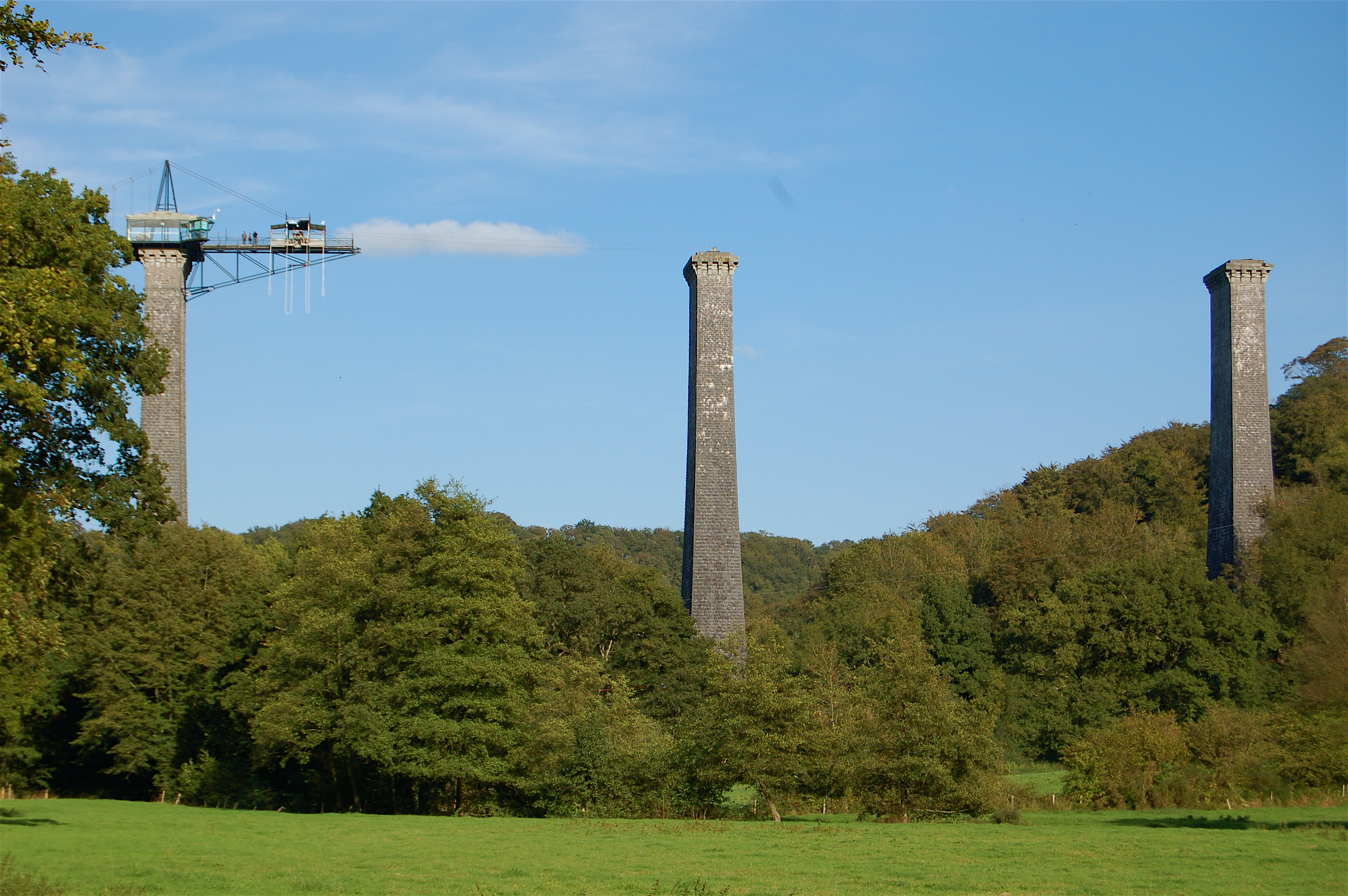
- Le viaduc de la Souleuvre
- Coordinates: 48°57′06″N 0°51′52″W
- Carries: Caen to Saint-Lô and Vire line
- Locale: La Ferrière-Harang, Normandy, France
- Official name: Le viaduc de la Souleuvre

Characteristics
- Material: Metallic

History
- Designer: Gustave Eiffel
- Construction end: November 12, 1893
- Closed: 1960

Location
- Interactive map of Souleuvre Viaduct

Viaduc de la Souleuvre is a partially demolished railway viaduct over the Souleuvre River in La Ferrière-Harang, Normandy, France, and has now grown into an amusement park, after starting as a bungee jumping site in 1990.

== History ==
Built by French engineer Gustave Eiffel for the Caen to Saint-Lô and Vire line, the Viaduc de la Souleuvre opened November 12, 1893. The total length of the viaduct was 364.20 m (1,200 ft), had a maximum height of 62.50 m (210 ft) and was set on five stone pillars. The height of these pillars varies between 26 m and 60 m, their bases are 18 m by 8 m and their tops are 7 m by 4 m. They were built with granite blocks from the Vire region quarries, each of a weight of 350 kg, and with mortar sand from the Chausey Islands, totaling 14000 m^{3}.

Before World War II, about 15 trains a day crossed the viaduct. It was used by the Germans during the War. The Allied Forces tried to destroy the viaduct in 1944, but only managed to partially damage it. More than 500 bombs were dropped around it without hitting it. In August 1944, the viaduct was repaired by the Americans.

When the rail line closed in 1960, the viaduct went into disrepair. Despite large local preservationist opinion campaigns, the railway platform was demolished in 1970. Only the five large stone pillars remain.

== Modern Usage ==
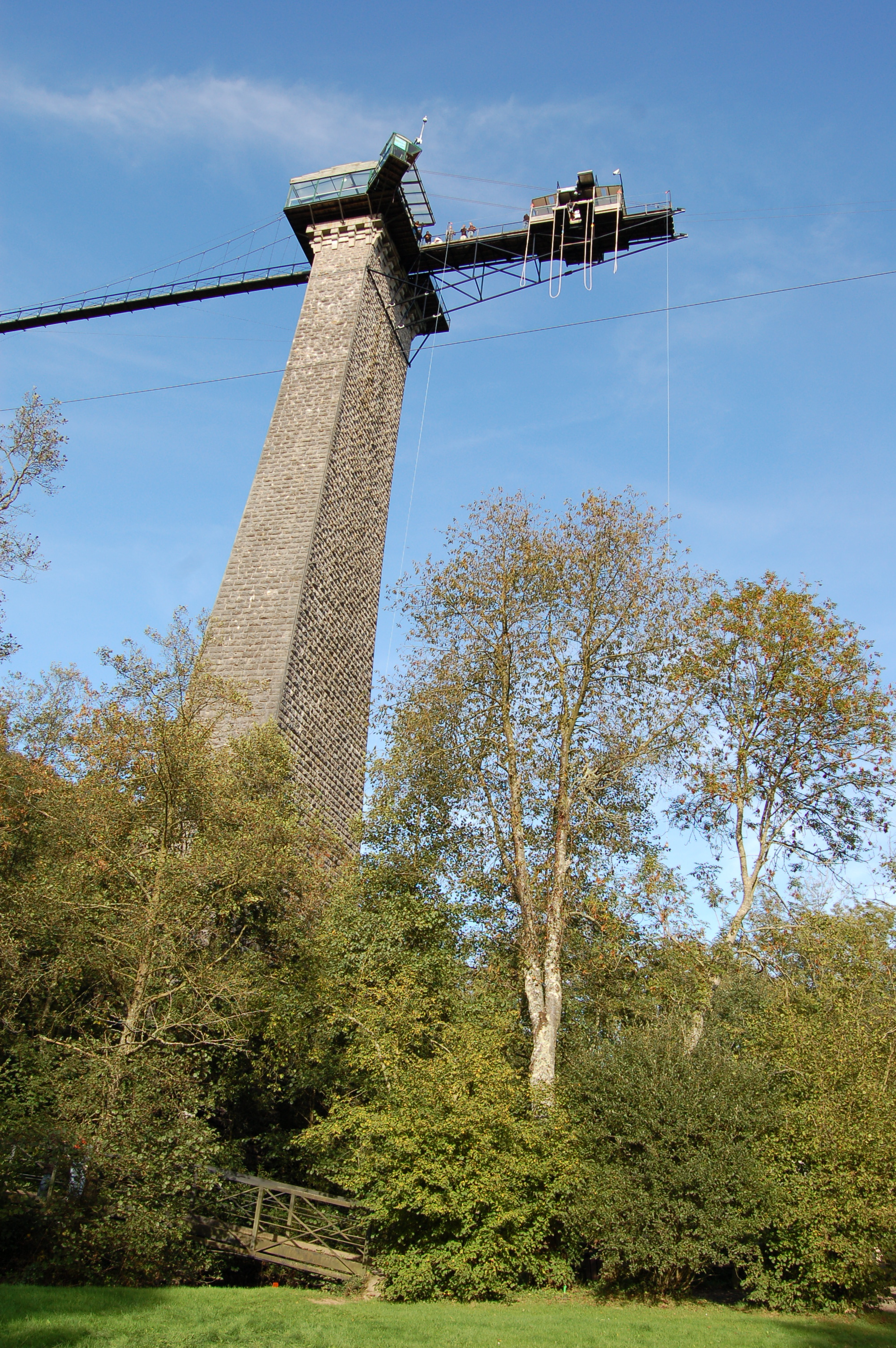
Le viaduc de la Souleuvre

In 1990, a permanent platform for bungee jumping was established by A. J. Hackett atop the highest pillar. A light gangway was established where the railway platform used to be, allowing access to the platform from the side of the bridge.

Since then the viaduct has grown into an amusement park, with the Viaducts now featuring, a zip line, giant swing, pendular jump plus walkway with Glass floors. In 2013 an all weather toboggan run was added. In 2016 a "barefoot" sensory garden was added to the site The garden is a Botanical garden featuring over 6,000 species of plants.

== Geography ==
Part of the is designated a Natura 2000 site called the Bassin de la Souleuvre.

The Viaduct is in the area known as Suisse Normande.

== Photo gallery ==
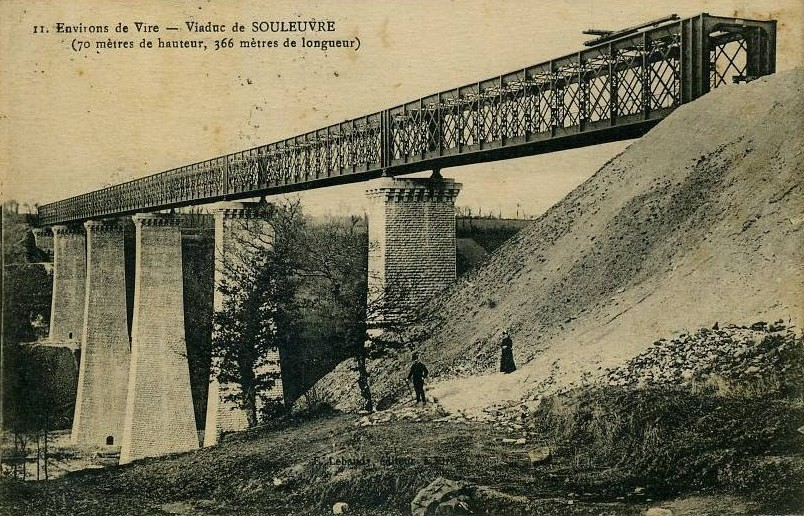
Calvados viaduct at Souleuvre

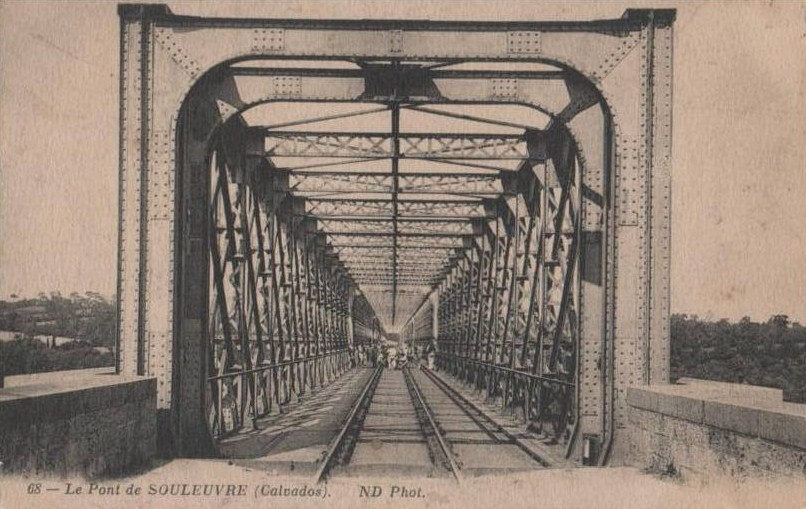
Entrance to the Calvados viaduct at Souleuvre

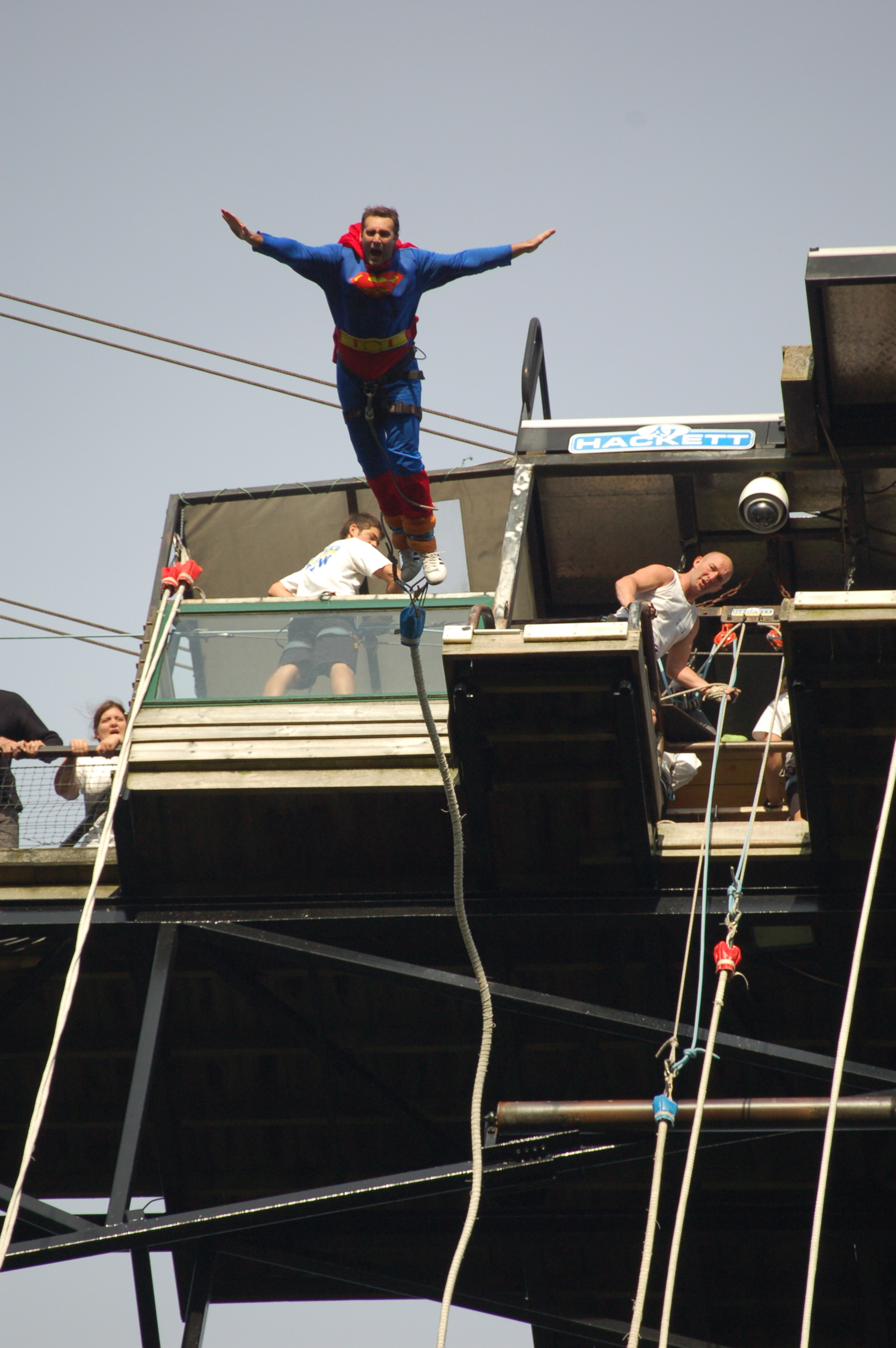
Bungee jump from the Souleuvre Viaduct

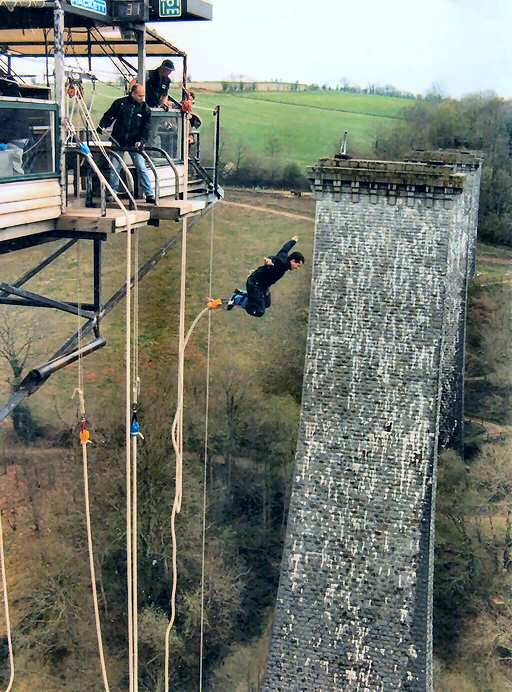
Bungee Jump from Viaduc de la Souleuvre
