= Dangerous Sports Club =

1970s UK organisation

The Dangerous Sports Club was a group of adventurers and extreme sports pioneers based in Oxford and London, England. They were active from the late 1970s to the late 1980s, during which they developed modern bungee jumping and experimented with a variety of other innovative sporting activities.

== Origins ==
The Dangerous Sports Club was co-founded by David Kirke, Chris Baker, Ed Hulton and Alan Weston in the 1970s. They first came to wide public attention by inventing modern day bungee jumping, by making the first modern jumps on 1 April 1979, from the Clifton Suspension Bridge, Bristol, England. They followed the Clifton Bridge effort with a jump from the Golden Gate Bridge in San Francisco (including the first female bungee jump by Jane Wilmot), and with a televised leap from the Royal Gorge Bridge in Colorado, sponsored by and televised on the popular American television program That's Incredible! Initially, bungee jumping was a niche novelty; it was popularised by A J Hackett, and has become a mainstream activity.

David Kirke died on 21 October 2023, at the age of 78.

== History ==
The club's activity and membership peaked in the 1980s, with several dozen active members and holding a wide range of events. The Club was heavily covered in the press, and made a film released in 1982 ("The History of the Dangerous Sports Club") as a supporting feature. Their activities were recorded by photographer Dafydd Jones, including an image of a young Nigella Lawson playing croquet from a sedan chair during a club tea party. The group split into various factions over the years. Monty Python member Graham Chapman was perhaps their most famous member, who worked on a feature film about the club. When making personal appearances in the 1980s, Chapman would show films of Club activities.

The Club, although later achieving a degree of social diversity, was rooted in the English upper class and centred in Oxford and, later, the West End of London. The style of dress adopted by members during their activities often included top hats and tailcoats, gaining a champagne-swilling image.

=== Activities ===
In addition to bungee jumping, the club specialised in high risk and surreal activities. The Club pioneered surrealist skiing, beginning in 1983 and holding three events at St. Moritz, Switzerland, in which competitors were required to devise a sculpture mounted on skis and ride it down a mountain. Entries included a grand piano, a Louis XIV dining set, and an 8-man boat. The event reached its limits when the Club arrived in St. Moritz with a London double-decker bus, wanting to send it down the ski slopes, and the Swiss resort managers refused. In 1986, David Kirke was sponsored by Foster's Lager to cross the English Channel in a kangaroo-shaped balloon, suspended beneath helium balloons, leading to his prosecution for flying without a pilot's licence.

Other Club activities included expedition hang gliding from active volcanoes; the launching of giant (60 ft) plastic spheres with pilots suspended in the centre (zorbing); microlight flying; surfing on magma; and BASE jumping (in the early days of this sport).

=== Trebuchet death ===
The Oxford Stunt Factory, which shared many members with the Dangerous Sports Club, gained notoriety in 2002 when an Oxford student was killed on launch from a trebuchet by former Club members David Aitkenhead and Richard Wicks. The trebuchet had been set up to throw a subject around 30 metres into a safety net. However, Kostydin (Dino) Yankov, 19, fell short of the safety net and suffered severe spinal and leg injuries, and died five hours later in Frenchay Hospital, Bristol. Aitkenhead and Wicks were charged with manslaughter, but were acquitted on grounds of insufficient evidence.
