= Land diving =

Ritual of Pentecost Island, Vanuatu

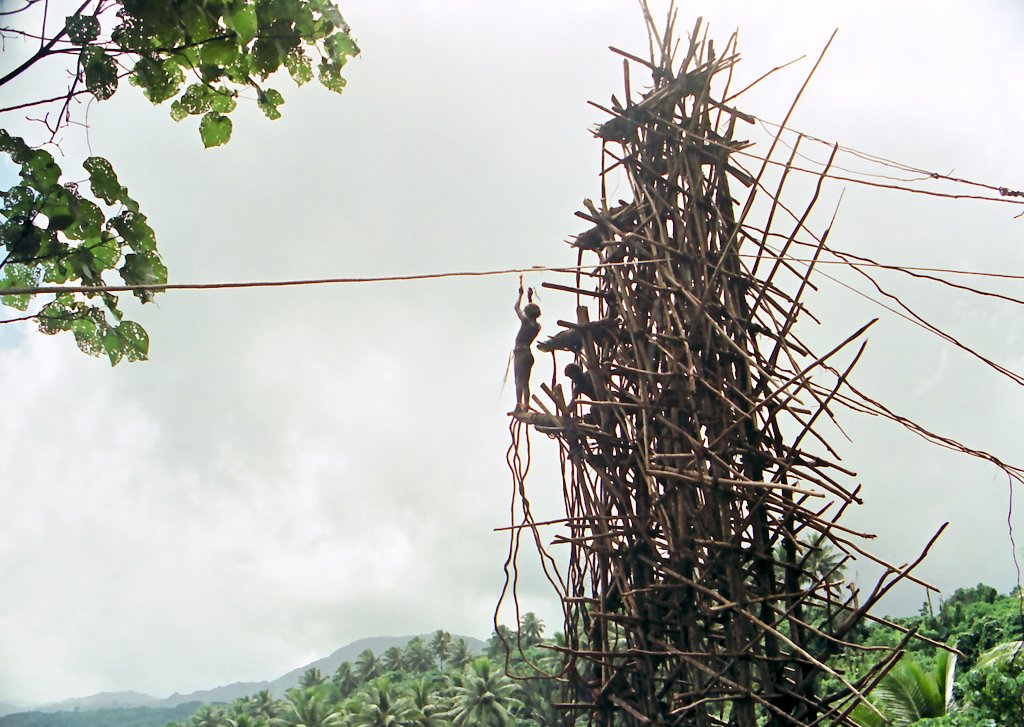
A diver preparing to jump. Except for the vines, land diving is performed without safety equipment.

Land diving (Sa: Gol, Bislama: Nanggol) is a ritual performed by the men of the southern part of Pentecost Island, Vanuatu. Men jump off wooden towers around 20 to 30 meters (66 to 98 ft) high, with two tree vines wrapped around the ankles. The tradition has developed into a tourist attraction. According to the Guinness World Records, the g-force experienced by those at their lowest point in the dive is the greatest experienced in the non-industrialized world by humans.

== Etymology ==
The Bislama word nanggol comes from the Saa term gol (also spelled ghol), with the prefixed article na- typical of the indigenous languages of Vanuatu.

== Background ==
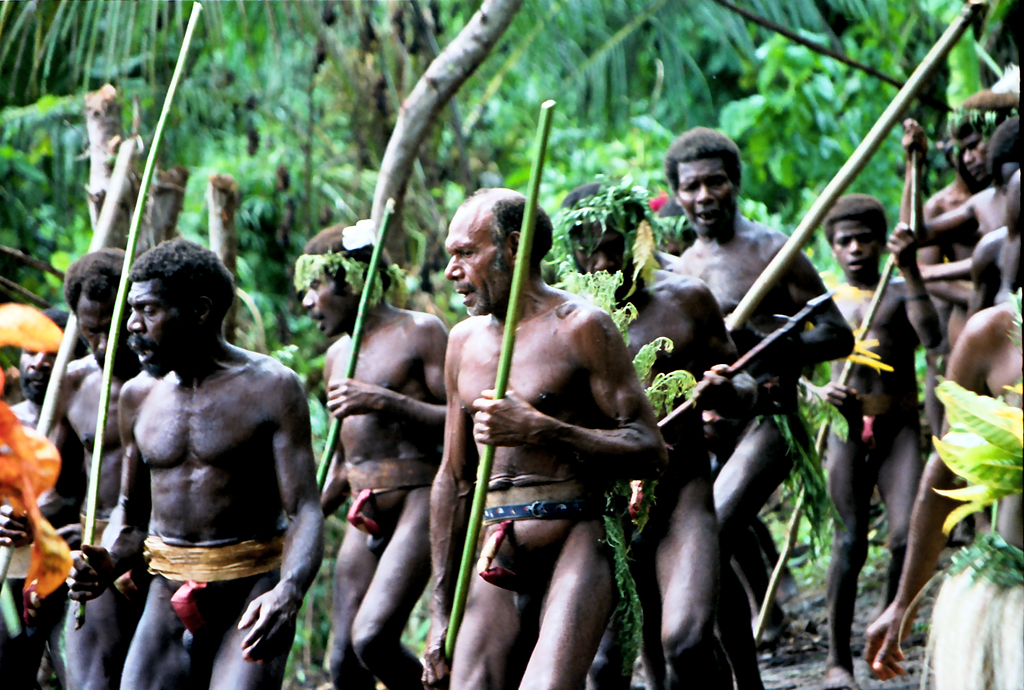
Pentecost Islanders

As told to David Attenborough in 1959 by a local chief and famous jumper, the origin of land diving is described in a legend of a woman who was unfaithful to her husband. When the husband ran after her she climbed a tree and the husband climbed after her. When they reached the top of the tree they began to argue, with the husband asking why the wife had been unfaithful. The wife told the husband that he was a weakling and coward, and that he wouldn't even jump to the ground from there. The husband said that he would jump if she did. They both jumped, but the woman had taken the precaution of tying vines to her ankles, so the husband died, but the wife survived. The other men were humiliated that another one of them had been tricked, so they built a tower taller than the tree to prove their bravery and ability.

Alternately, the origin has been described as the wife being dissatisfied with her husband, Tamalie (or some variation of the name). Or it is claimed that the woman was upset that her husband was too vigorous regarding his sexual wants, so she ran away into the forest. Her husband followed her, so she climbed a banyan tree. Tamalie climbed after her, and so she tied lianas to her ankles and jumped and survived. Her husband jumped after her, but did not tie lianas to himself, which caused him to plummet and die. In this account, women did it in respect to the original woman who did it, but husbands were not comfortable with seeing their wives in such positions, so they took the sport for themselves, and it gradually changed from trees to specifically designed wooden towers. The men performed the original land diving so that they would not be tricked again.

The land diving ritual is associated with the annual yam harvest. It is performed annually in the months of April, May, or June. A good dive helps ensure a bountiful yam harvest.

The villagers believe land diving can enhance the health and strength of the divers. A successful dive can remove the illnesses and physical problems associated with the wet season. Furthermore, land diving is considered as an expression of masculinity, as it demonstrates boldness that was associated with the bwahri or warrior. The men who do not choose to dive or back out of diving are humiliated as cowards.

In the Sa language, gol refers to both the tower and the land dive. The tower symbolically represents a body, with a head, shoulders, breasts, belly, genitals, and knees. The diving platforms represent the penises and the struts beneath represent the vaginas.

== Preparation ==
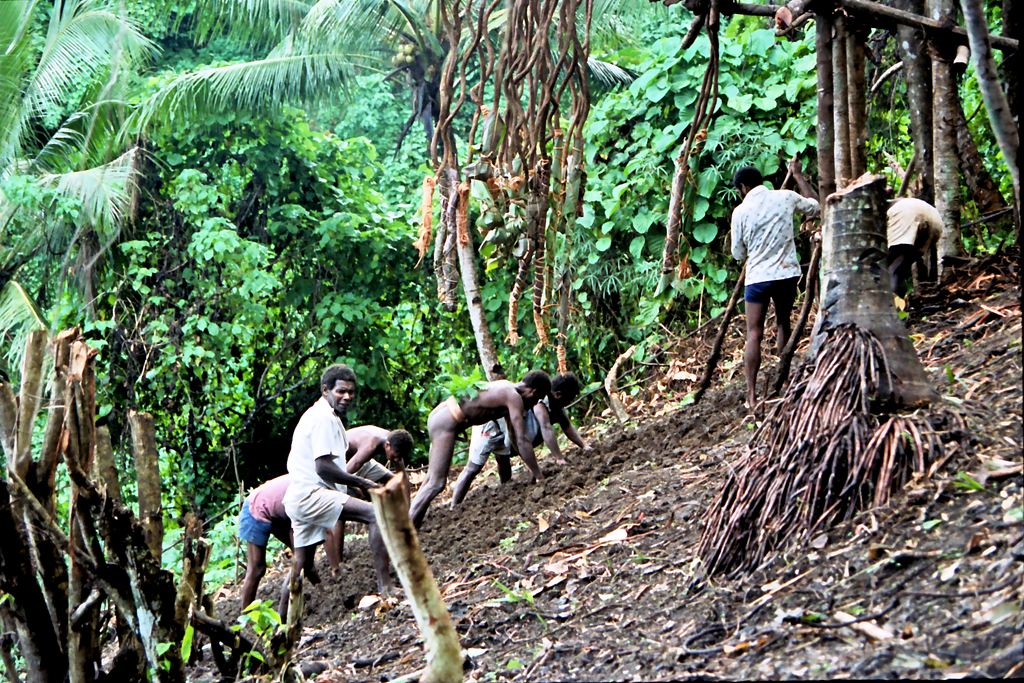
Villagers soften the ground to help absorb the impact.

The time of yam harvest is significant because tower construction is best done during the dry season. Also, the lianas have the best elasticity during this time. During the period of preparation for nanggol, the men seclude themselves from the women and refrain from sex. Furthermore, women are not allowed to go near the tower or else Tamalie, who lives in the tower, may seek vengeance, leading to the death of a diver. Additionally, the men must not wear any lucky charms during the dive.

The construction of the tower typically takes between two and five weeks. Around twenty to thirty men help construct it. The men cut trees to construct the body, clear a site for the tower, and remove rocks from the soil. The soil is tilled to soften the ground. The wood is freshly cut, so that it can remain strong. The core of the tower is made from a lopped tree, and a pole scaffolding tied together with vines stabilizing it. Several platforms come out about two meters (six feet seven inches) from the front of the tower, supported by several struts. The lowest platform is around 10 meters (33 ft), and the highest platform is near the top. During the jump, the platform supports snap, causing the platform to hinge downward and absorb some of the force from falling.

The vines are selected by a village elder and matched with each jumper's weight without any mechanical calculations. The vines need to be supple, elastic, and full of sap in order to be safe, so are kept bundled in leaves after preparation and before the ceremony. The ends of the vines are shredded to allow the fibres to be looped around the ankles of the jumpers. If the vine is too long, the diver can hit the ground hard, but if the vine is too short, then the diver can collide with the tower.

Before these men dive, they often bring closure to unsettled business and disputes in case they die. The night before the jump, divers sleep beneath the tower to ward off evil spirits.

== Ritual ==
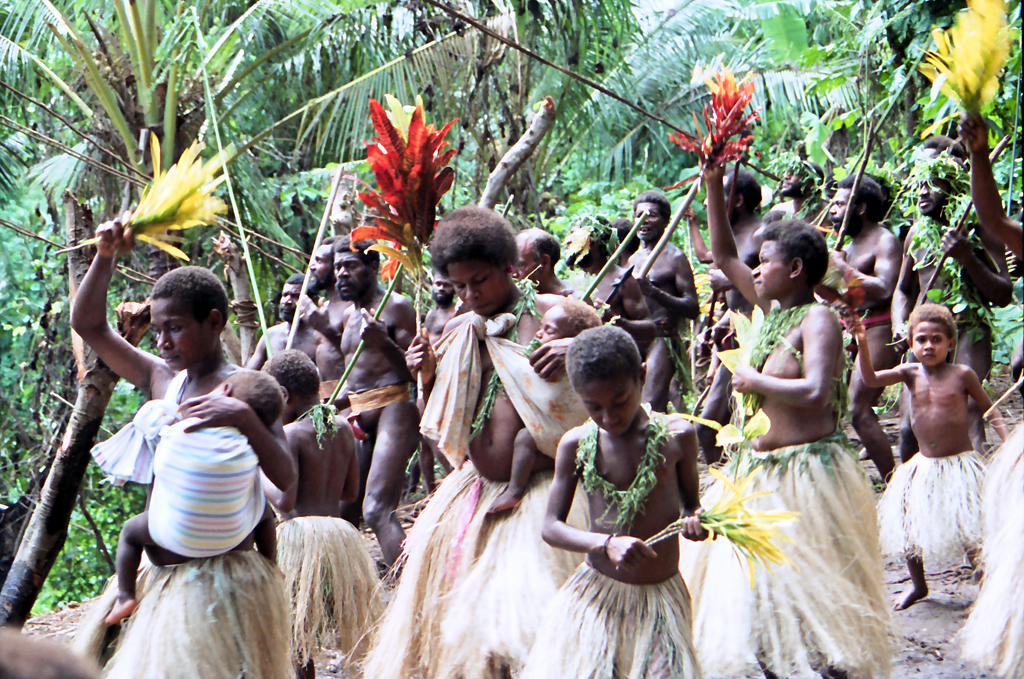
Women and girls below dance and chant, providing emotional support for the divers.

Though the majority of the islanders are now Christian, they also adhere to the ancient beliefs. Before dawn on the day of the ceremony, the men undergo a ritual wash, anoint coconut oil on themselves, and decorate their bodies. Men wear traditional nambas and boar tusks around their necks, while women wear traditional grass skirts and go bare-breasted. Only the men are allowed to dive, but the dancing women provide mental support. Around 10 to 20 men in a village will jump.

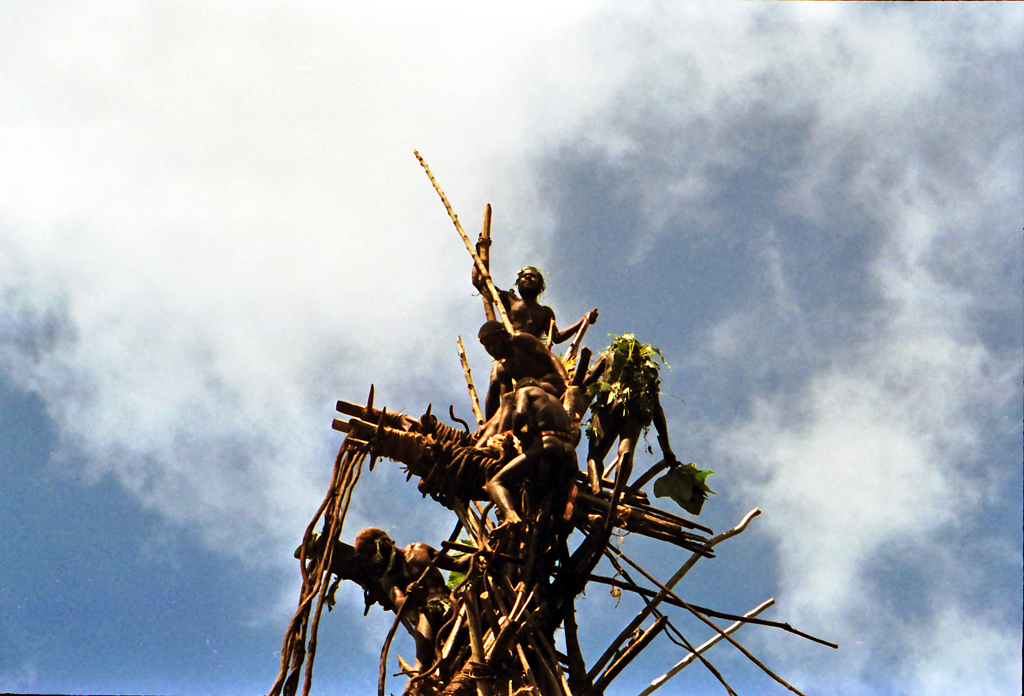
The platforms are at several different heights, with the most experienced diver jumping from the top.

The ritual begins with the least experienced jumpers on the lower platforms and ends with the most experienced jumpers on the upper platforms. The ideal jump is high with the jumper landing close to the ground. The goal is to brush the shoulders against the ground. The higher the jump, the more bountiful the harvest. Before diving, the jumper can give speeches, sing songs, and make pantomimes.

The diver crosses his arms over his chest to help prevent injury to the arms. The head is tucked in so his shoulders can contact the ground. Therefore, the divers risk a number of injuries, such as a broken neck or a concussion. During the dive, the jumper can reach speeds of around 45 mph (72 km/h). Right after a dive, other villagers rush in and take care of the diver.

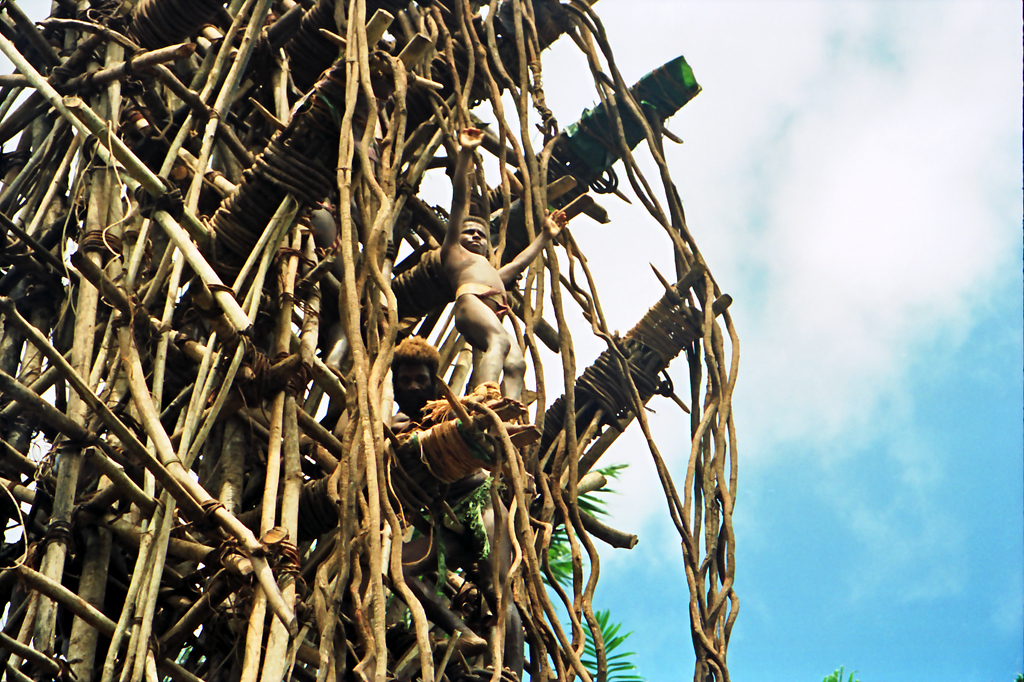
Land diving is a rite of passage for boys. Boys jump at lower platforms.

For boys, land diving is a rite of passage. After circumcision at the age of around seven to eight, they can participate in the ritual. When a boy is ready to become a man, he land dives in the presence of his elders. His mother holds a favourite childhood item, for example, a piece of cloth. After completing the dive, the item is thrown away, demonstrating that the boy has become a man.

== Modern history ==
In the mid-nineteenth century, missionaries came to the area and persuaded the natives to stop land diving. In the 1970s, anti-colonialism caused land diving to be seen in a new light as way to demonstrate their cultural identity. After the independence from colonial powers in 1980, the ritual was revived by Christian locals from neighbouring areas. In 1995, the people of Pentecost Island, with the support of Vanuatu's attorney-general, declared that they would endeavor to get royalties from bungee jumping enterprises because they viewed the tradition as stolen.

== Notable dives ==
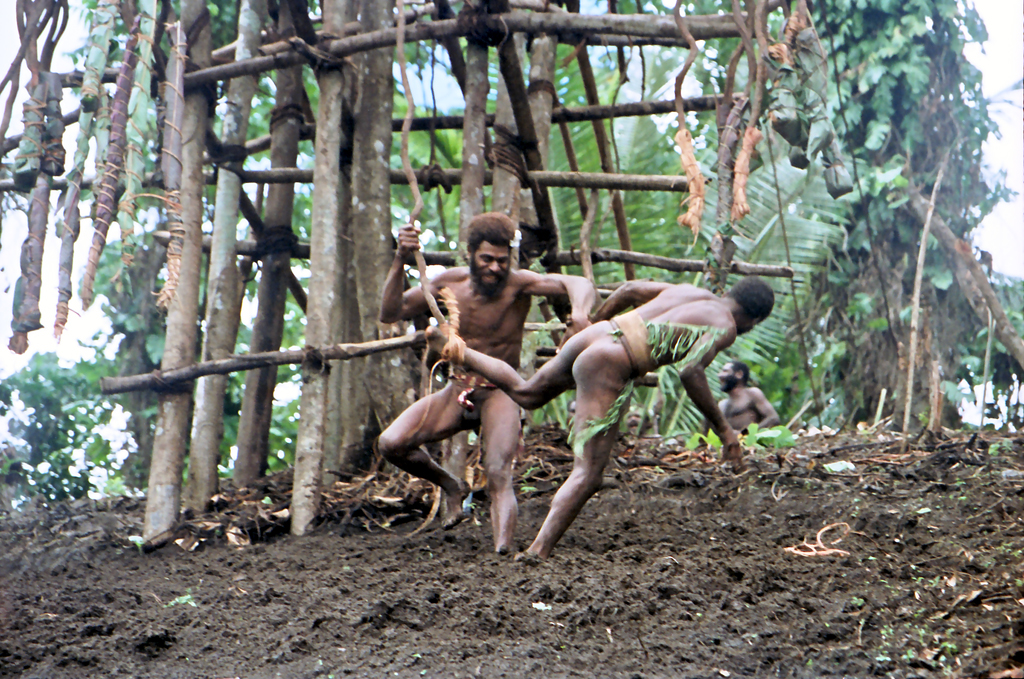
A villager cuts the vines from a diver after a successful jump.

=== Dive for French resident commissioner ===
In 1952, a land dive was performed for a French resident commissioner. British and French troops attacked some villages based on the rumor of a developing cargo cult. Several older men were arrested, though their sons offered to take their place. The men were let go in return for a land dive performance for the French resident commissioner. During the demonstration, the villagers sang a chant in Sa, incomprehensible to the resident commissioner, which noted the irony that the white resident commissioner thought he was strong, whereas it was the native men who were jumping from the towers.

=== Queen Elizabeth II incident ===
In 1974, Queen Elizabeth II of Great Britain visited Vanuatu and observed the spectacle. The British colonial administration wanted the Queen to have an interesting tour, and convinced the Anglican villagers of the Melanesian Mission at Point Cross to perform a jump. However, the vines were not elastic enough because it was the wrong season, the middle of the wet season. One diver had both lianas broken, broke his back from falling, and later died in a hospital.

=== Kal Müller ===
Kal Müller, a journalist, is the first white man to land dive. Müller waited two years for the villagers of Bunlap to invite him to jump. Before the jump, he spent seven months with the villagers. His experiences were recounted in the December 1970 edition of National Geographic Magazine, Land Diving With the Pentecost Islanders.

=== Karl Pilkington ===
Karl Pilkington was supposed to jump from the highest bar for his television program, An Idiot Abroad, as he had refused to bungee jump in New Zealand. However, he jumped only from the lowest bar after the natives agreed that it was a legitimate land dive.

== Tourism ==
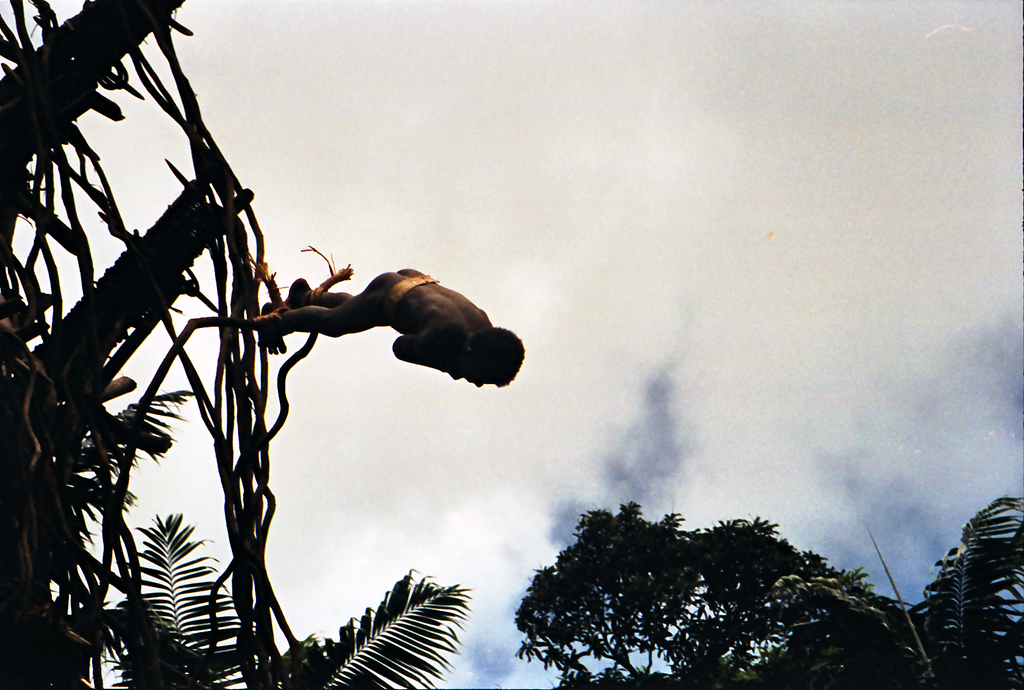
The divers cross their arms to prevent injury.

Land diving has become a tourist attraction for the villagers. The tourism aspect of land diving has come with some debate, such as maintaining the custom's integrity while gaining attention. To prevent commercialization of land diving, a tourism council that handles the tourists and presentation was formed by the chiefs. The tourism office works with tour companies and provides revenue by bringing in foreigners. The local control and government support maintain the ritual's authenticity, while encouraging promotion. In 1982, tourists paid 35 pounds per person to watch the event. Tourists watching the land-diving today typically pay 10,000–12,000 vatu per person (around $100–120). Though it was an annual event, land diving now occurs weekly from April to June because of its profitability. Some tourists want to try land diving themselves, but are often denied for fear of safety. In 2006, commercial filming of the ritual was banned by the Vanuatu Cultural Centre to protect the culture.

== See also ==
- Bungee jumping

== Works cited ==
- Attenborough, David (1966). "The Land-Diving Ceremony in Pentecost, New Hebrides)". Philosophical Transactions of the Royal Society of London. Series B, Biological Sciences. 251 (772). The Royal Society: 503. Bibcode:1966RSPTB.251..503A. doi:10.1098/rstb.1966.0044.
- Jolly, Margaret (1994). "Kastom as Commodity: The Land Dive as Indigenous Rite and Tourist Spectacle in Vanuatu". In Lindstrom, L.; White, G. (eds.). Culture, Kastom, Tradition: Cultural Policy in Melanesia. Suva: Institute of Pacific Studies. pp. 131–146. ISBN 982-02-0102-0.
- Harewood, Jocelyn (2009). Vanuatu & New Caledonia (Multi Country Guide). Lonely Planet. ISBN 978-1-74104-792-9.
- Müller, Kal (1970). "Land Diving With the Pentecost Islanders". National Geographic Magazine. 138 (6). National Geographic Society: 799–817.
- Pocock, David; MacClancy, Jeremy (1998). Understanding Social Anthropology. London: Athlone Press. p. xviii-xix. ISBN 0-485-12140-9.
- Theobald, William F. (1998). Global Tourism (2nd ed.). Oxford: Butterworth-Heinemann. p. 414. ISBN 0-7506-4022-7.
