= Saa language =

Austronesian language spoken in Vanuatu

Saa
- Native to: Vanuatu
- Region: Pentecost Island
- Native speakers: (2,500 cited 2001)
- Language family: Austronesian: Malayo-Polynesian; Oceanic; Southern Oceanic; North-Central Vanuatu; Central Vanuatu; Saa
- Dialects: Ponorwal; Lolatavola; Ninebulo

Language codes
- ISO 639-3: sax
- Glottolog: saaa1241
- Sa is not endangered according to the classification system of the UNESCO Atlas of the World's Languages in Danger

Sa or Saa is an Austronesian language spoken in southern Pentecost Island, Vanuatu. It had an estimated 2,500 speakers in the year 2000.

== Dialects and range ==
Sa has numerous dialects, with no well-established names or boundaries. At a meeting in 2008, speakers recognised four main dialects, with sub-dialectal variation and mixing of dialects in some areas.

The two central dialects are relatively similar to one another and are generally understood by all Sa speakers. Most writing and research in Sa has been in one of these dialects:

- A western dialect ("Saa" with a long a) is spoken on the west coast around Panas, Wali, Panngi and Ranputor.
- An eastern dialect ("Sa" with a short a) is spoken in the south-east around Ranwas. A variant of this dialect with longer vowels in certain words is spoken at Poinkros in the far south, and is used in the Bible Society's recent Gospel translations.

There are also two outlying dialects, which are highly distinctive and difficult for speakers of other dialects to understand:

- A northern dialect ("F dialect"), characterised by the presence of an f sound, is spoken in the north of the Sa area, at St Henri (Fatsare) and by some at Ran'gusuksu. It has close links with neighbouring Ske language and with Doltes, the extinct dialect of Hotwata village.
- A southern dialect ("Ha"), notable for the widespread replacement of s with h, is spoken in Bay Martelli (Harop) and Londar, and has close links with the languages of neighbouring Ambrym island.

The distinctive speech of villages such as Bunlap, Bay Barrier (Ranon) and Wanur appears to comprise mixtures of neighbouring dialects.

People in southern Pentecost remember the existence of additional dialects that are now extinct.

== Phonology ==
The consonants of Sa include b, d, g, h, k, l, m, n, ng (as in English "singer"), p, r, s, t, and w. In most dialects there is also j (occasionally written "ts"), which is apparently an allophone of t found before the vowels i and u although speakers regard it separately. Most speakers also use labiovelar bw, mw and pw, although from some speakers of outlying dialects these are indistinguishable from normal b, m and p. In addition to these consonants, the northern dialect has a bilabial f. In this dialect s may be pronounced like English sh.

Consonants
		Labial	Labiovelar	Alveolar	Post-Alveolar	Velar	Glottal
Nasal		m	mʷ	n		ŋ	
Plosive	voiceless	p	pʷ	t		k	
Plosive	voiced	b	bʷ	d		g	
Affricate				(t͡s)			
Fricative		(f)		s	(ʃ)		h
Approximant			w	l			
Trill				r			

As a general rule, clusters of consonants do not occur within a syllable. Word roots may begin with a pair of consonants, but in speech the first of these consonants is usually either dropped or attached to the final syllable of the preceding word.

In addition to the five standard vowels (a, e, i, o and u), certain authors have proposed that Sa has additional mid-high vowels ê (intermediate between e and i) and ô (intermediate between o and u). Not all authors have recognised these extra vowels, but they have been accepted by local teachers of vernacular literacy and are used in the Bible Society's recent Gospel translations. Vowels are distinguished for length, with long vowels (aa, ee, etc.) often occurring where a consonant has historically been lost. Vowels can occur alone or in various combinations.

Stress is normally on the penultimate syllable of a word. However, syllables that end with a consonant or a long vowel take stress in precedence to other syllables.

Vowels
	Front	Central	Back
High	i iː		u uː
Mid-High	(e eː)		(o oː)
Mid	e̞ e̞ː		o̞ o̞ː
Low		a aː	

== Grammar ==
Basic word order in Sa is subject–verb–object.

=== Pronouns ===
Personal pronouns are distinguished by person and number. They are not distinguished by gender. With one exception, subject and object pronouns are identical.

The singular and plural pronouns are as follows:

		Singular	Plural
1st person	inclusive	nê	kê(t)
1st person	exclusive	nê	gema
2nd person		êk ("o" in subject position)	gimi
3rd person		i	êr

In addition, there are dual pronouns (referring to two people), which incorporate the particle kô, and paucal pronouns (referring to a small number of people), which incorporate the particle têl or pat.

=== Nouns ===
Nouns in Sa are not preceded by articles. Plurality is indicated by placing the pronoun êr ("them") or a number after the noun.

Nouns may be either free, or directly possessed. Directly possessed nouns are followed either by a suffix or a noun indicating whom an item belongs to. For example:

sêk = my name
sêm = your name
sên = his/her name
sê temak = my father's name

The possessive suffixes are as follows:

		Singular	Plural
1st person	inclusive	-k	kêt
1st person	exclusive	-k	gma
2nd person		-m	gmi
3rd person	human	-n	-r
3rd person	non-human	-tê	-r

Possession may also be indicated by the use of the word na- "of" (or a- in the case of food items), followed either by a possessive suffix or the name of the possessor:

nak ôl = my coconut (belonging)
nam ôl = your coconut (belonging)
nan ôl = his/her coconut (belonging)
ôl na selak = my brother's coconut (belonging)

ak ôl = my coconut (to eat)
am ôl = your coconut (to eat)
an ôl = his/her coconut (to eat)

ôl natê = coconut for it (association)

A verb may be transformed into a noun by the addition of a nominalising suffix -an:

wêl = to dance (verb)
wêlan = a dance (noun)

Modifiers generally come after a noun:

ere = village
ere lêp = big village

=== Verbs ===
Verbs in Sa are usually (though not always) preceded by verb markers indicating the tense, aspect and mood of the action.

In positive statements the marker is typically m-, ma-, mwa-, me- or a variant (depending on the dialect, the verb and the environment). Past and present tense are not explicitly distinguished:

nê mlos = I bathe / I bathed
nê marngo = I hear / I heard

In negative statements this marker is replaced with taa- or a variant:

nê taalos = I don't bathe / I didn't bathe
nê taarngo = I don't hear / I didn't hear

These markers may be combined with a future marker t or te:

nê met los = I will bathe
nê meterngo = I will hear
nê taat los = I won't bathe
nê taaterngo = I won't hear

In the imperative, the future marker occurs without any other marker:

O tlos! = [You] bathe!
O terngo! = [You] listen!

Hypothetical statements include a particle po:

nê metpo los = I should bathe

Completed actions are indicated using tê:

nê mlos tê = I bathed already

The subject can be omitted from a sentence, as in the second example below:

i meterngo = he will hear it
meterngo = it will be heard

Transitive and intransitive verb forms are distinguished, with transitive verbs often followed by nê:

êr rôs = they move
êr rôsnê at = they move the stone

Verbs in Sa can be linked together in a variety of serial verb constructions.

== Sample phrases ==
English	Sa - central dialects (Panngi, Ranwas, Bunlap)	Sa - northern dialect (Fatsare)	Sa - southern dialect (Bay Martelli)
Where are you going?	O metea bê?	O mfa be?	O metea be?
I'm going to...	Nê metea...	Nê mfa...	Nê metea...
Where have you come from?	O mamra bê?	O mamra be?	O mamra be?
I've come from...	Nê mamra...	Nê mamra...	Nê mamra...
What's your name?	Sêm be sê?	Sêm be sê?	Hêm be hê?
My name is...	Sêk be...	Sêk be...	Hêk be...
How much? / How many?	Beês?	Befês?	Beêh?
one	(be)su	s^{h}uf	hu
two	(be)ru	(be)ru	(be)ru
three	(be)têl	(be)jil	(be)têl
four	(be)êt	(be)fêt	(be)êt
five	(be)lim	(be)lim	(be)lim
It's just fine	I mbetô nga	I mbetô nga	I mbetu nga
