= Cuba–Vanuatu relations =

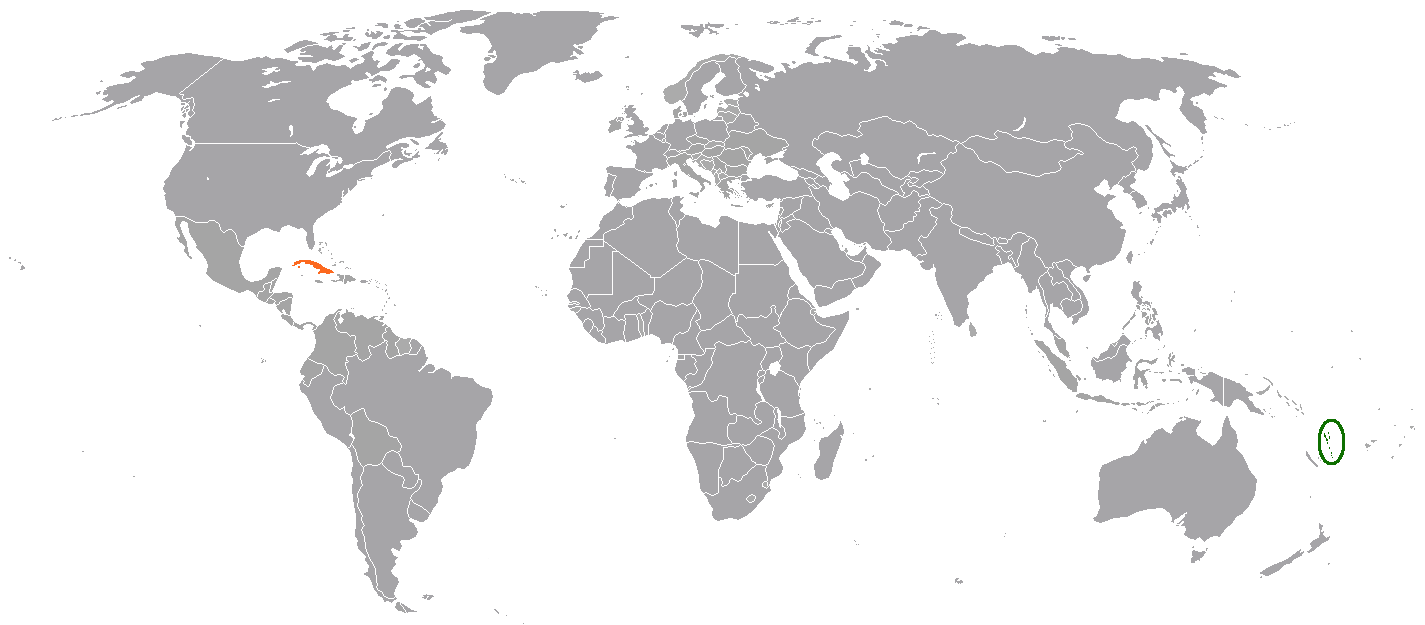

- Vanuatu: Cuba

Relations between Vanuatu and Cuba began shortly after the former gained its independence from France and the United Kingdom in 1980, and began establishing its own foreign policy as a newly independent state. Vanuatu and Cuba established official diplomatic relations in 1983.

== History ==
Early Cuban-Vanuatu relations must be considered within the scope of Vanuatu's resolutely independent foreign policy. Rejecting alignment with the Western bloc during the late stages of the Cold War, Vanuatu joined the Non-Aligned Movement in 1983, and established diplomatic relations both with the Soviet Union and (a few months later) with the United States in 1986.

In 1984, a Cuban diplomatic delegation visited Vanuatu, and E. Huffer suggests that this visit was instrumental in prompting the Asian Development Bank and ESCAP to open offices in Port-Vila shortly thereafter, "partly in an attempt to favour the integration of Vanuatu into the Western capitalist camp".

Vanuatu was the birthplace of Melanesian socialism, a doctrine promoted by Prime Minister Father Walter Lini, combining socialism, Christianity and traditional Melanesian values, which gave Vanuatu and Cuba some degree of common ideological ground - although Melanesian socialism may be seen as closer to Christian communism than to Marxism. In 1983, however, ni-Vanuatu Foreign Minister Sela Molisa stated that Vanuatu's joining the Non-Aligned Movement was born of a wish for neutrality, and that "the ni-Vanuatu government and the Vanua'aku Pati do not adhere to any ideology".

Lini lost office in 1991, and, under his successor Maxime Carlot Korman, his country's policy of engaging with countries viewed with suspicion by the West -notably Cuba, Libya and the Soviet Union- was allowed to fade.

More recently, in the 2000s, quasi-dormant relations between the two countries have been revived, in the context of Cuba's regional engagement in the Pacific. Cuba currently provides medical aid to Vanuatu and other countries in Oceania. As of September 2008, seventeen ni-Vanuatu are studying medicine in Cuba, with their expenses paid for by the Cuban government, and Cuban doctors are serving in Vanuatu. A representative of Vanuatu attended a multilateral Cuba-Pacific ministerial meeting in Havana in September 2008, where attendees discussed "strengthening co-operation in health, sports and education", and where Cuban authorities pledged to assist Pacific countries in coping with the effects of climate change.
