= Wantok Blong Yumi Bill =

Parliament of Vanuatu
- Enacted: 19 June 2010
- Introduced by: Edward Natapei MP; Maxime Carlot Korman MP
- Introduced: 19 June 2010

Summary
- Bill to declare Vanuatu’s foreign policy regarding West Papua
- Status: In force

The Wantok Blong Yumi Bill was a bill unanimously adopted by the Parliament of Vanuatu in June 2010. It was derived from a "People’s Petition", tabled in Parliament by Independent MP Ralph Regenvanu.

The bill's purpose was to express Vanuatu's recognition of West Papua's independence from Indonesia, and to commit Vanuatu to actively seek observer status for West Papua in the Melanesian Spearhead Group and the Pacific Islands Forum. The bill was supported both by Prime Minister Edward Natapei and opposition leader Maxime Carlot Korman, along with their respective parties. The government stated that the bill would "allow [it] to develop specific policies on how to support the independence struggle of West Papua". The bill's adoption was praised by the West Papua National Coalition for Liberation, which said it would "fulfill the dream of Fr Walter Lini (Vanuatu's first Prime Minister) who started this struggle in Vanuatu by saying that Vanuatu will not rest until it sees its brothers and sisters in the [sic] Melanesia get their freedom".

One consequence of the bill was that Vanuatu would "request [United Nations] General Assembly support for the International Court of Justice to provide an advisory opinion on the process in which the former Netherlands New Guinea was ceded to Indonesia in the 1960s".

Reviewing the bill, Islands Business described it as "perhaps the most significant development in recent times as regards regional support for the long suffering territory’s cause and for openly and officially espousing its independence from Indonesia", adding that it "captur[ed] the pan Melanesian spirit across political boundaries": "[I]f and when West Papua gets the independence and self rule it deserves, its people will have much to feel grateful to its Melanesian brethren across the Coral Sea". The New Zealand Herald described the bill as "reflecting a pan-Melanesian spirit across political boundaries".

"Wantok Blong Yumi" is Bislama for "Our Wantoks". Wantok is a Bislama, Tok Pisin and Pijin word which comes from the English "one talk", and means people who speak the same language, belong to the shame culture, are friends and help one another out.

== See also ==
- Foreign relations of Vanuatu
