= Soviet Union–Vanuatu relations =

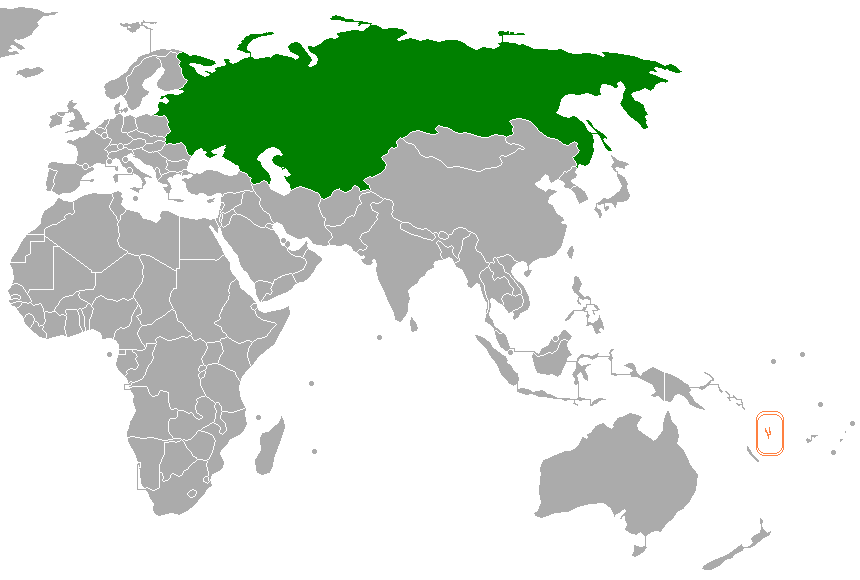

- Soviet Union: Vanuatu

The Soviet Union and Vanuatu established official diplomatic relations on 30 June 1986, three months to the day before Vanuatu established diplomatic relations with the United States.

== History ==
Vanuatu, which became independent from France and the United Kingdom in 1980, was led by Prime Minister Father Walter Lini, founder of the doctrine of Melanesian socialism, from 1980 to 1991. Lini's foreign policy was one of non-alignment, manifested by Vanuatu joining the Non-Aligned Movement in 1983. His government was the only one in Oceania at the time which refused to align with the Western bloc during the dying stages of the Cold War. Lini sought to maintain cordial, though not particularly close, relations with the Soviet Union. There was never any suggestion of Vanuatu aligning with the Eastern bloc; Lini was not a Marxist, and there was no Communist Party in Vanuatu.

In 1987, Vanuatu authorized Soviet vessels to fish within Vanuatu's Exclusive Economic Zone, in exchange for economic aid. The agreement lapsed the following year and was not renewed, due to disagreements over the price to be paid for fishing rights by the USSR.

The year 1991 was marked both by the end of Lini's last term in office and by the collapse of the Soviet Union. Thereafter, relations between Port-Vila and Moscow were virtually non-existent.

== See also ==
- Russia–Vanuatu relations
