= Libya–Vanuatu relations =

Libya-Vanuatu relations
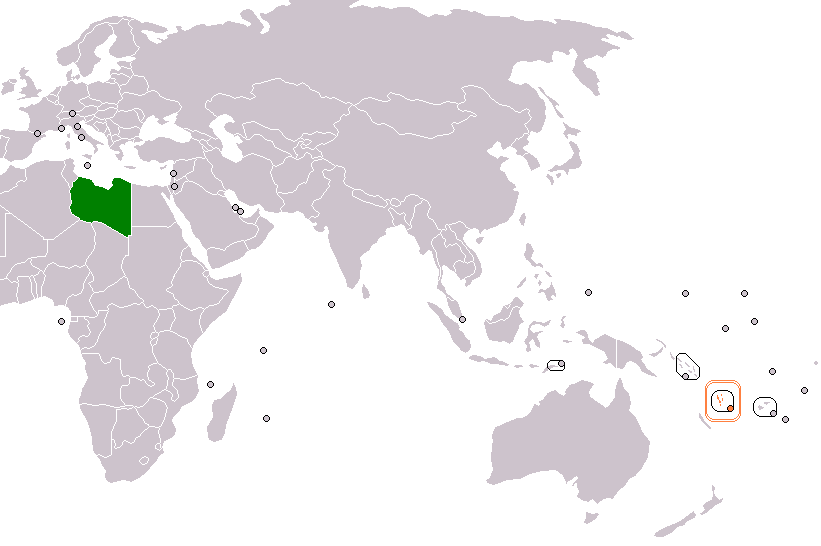

- Libya: Vanuatu

Libya–Vanuatu relations refer to foreign relations between Vanuatu and Libya.

== History ==
They established official diplomatic relations in 1986, at the initiative of the former. The aim, for Vanuatu, was twofold: first, to obtain access to favourable economic relations with a major oil-producing country, and second, to strengthen its policy of non-alignment by establishing relations with a notable country not aligned with the Western Bloc. Vanuatu's foreign policy in the 1980s, under Prime Minister Father Walter Lini, was based on refusing alignment with either bloc in the context of the Cold War, distinguishing it from every other country of Oceania, aligned with the West. Time magazine described Libya's reasons for establishing relations with Vanuatu as "unclear", suggesting that it might simply wish to "irritate the U.S. and France". Vanuatu's relations with both France and the United States were strained at the time.

Vanuatu condemned the 1986 bombing of Libya by the United States. Lini wrote to Colonel Muammar Gaddafi to express his condolences, notably at the purported death of Gaddafi's daughter, and his dismay that "innocent lives have been taken by the bombs of a superpower". Barak Sopé added that "the United States were wrong, they behaved as terrorists and aggressors", and that "the CIA is involved in all sorts of similar activities. In Nicaragua, the Americans are supporting terrorists."

In 1987, several ni-Vanuatu received "security training" in Libya at their government's request, prompting concern from Bob Hawke's government in Australia. Australia also expressed discomfort at the possible opening of a Libyan embassy in Vanuatu.

The country's relations with Libya proved politically contentious in Vanuatu, including within the ruling Vanua'aku Party. While Prime Minister Walter Lini and party Secretary-General Barak Sopé defended their decision to engage with Libya, Foreign Affairs Minister Sela Molisa was critical. The debate appeared to explain Lini's eventual decision to "postpone indefinitely" the projected opening of a Libyan People's Bureau in Port Vila.

Lini lost office in 1991, and his successors did little to maintain Libyan–ni-Vanuatu relations, which thereafter all but lapsed.

In September 2011, Vanuatu was one of 114 states to vote in favour of awarding Libya's seat in the United Nations to the National Transitional Council, following the ousting of Muammar Gaddafi in the 2011 Libyan civil war.
