= Ralph Regenvanu =

Ni-Vanuatu anthropologist

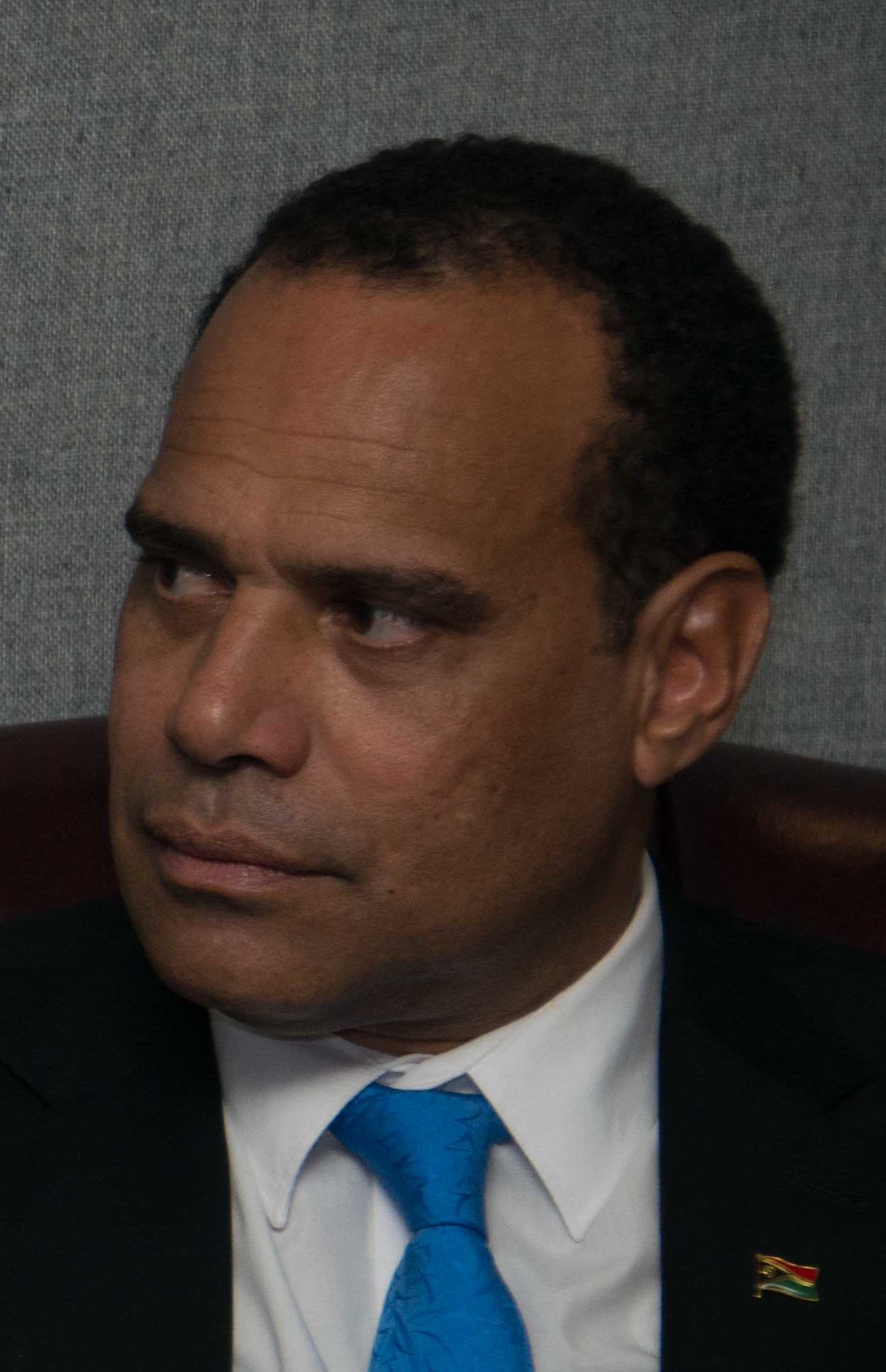
- Regenvanuga in 2018

Minister of Climate Change
- Incumbent
- Assumed office 4 November 2022
- Prime Minister: Ishmael Kalsakau
- Preceded by: Bruno Leingkone

Minister of Foreign Affairs and Trade
- In office 19 December 2017 – 20 April 2020
- Prime Minister: Charlot Salwai
- Preceded by: Bruno Leingkone
- Succeeded by: Marc Ati

Minister of Lands and Natural Resources
- In office 11 February 2016 – 19 December 2017
- Prime Minister: Charlot Salwai
- Preceded by: Paul Telukluk
- Succeeded by: Alfred Maos
- In office 23 March 2013 – 11 June 2015
- Prime Minister: Moana Carcasses Kalosil; Joe Natuman
- Preceded by: James Bule
- Succeeded by: Paul Telukluk

Minister of Justice and Social Affairs
- In office 26 June 2011 – 16 January 2012
- Prime Minister: Sato Kilman
- Preceded by: Bakoa Kaltonga (interim)
- Succeeded by: Charlot Salwai
- In office 13 May 2011 – 16 June 2011
- Prime Minister: Sato Kilman
- Preceded by: Yoan Simon
- Succeeded by: Bakoa Kaltonga (interim)
- In office 10 March 2011 – 24 April 2011
- Prime Minister: Sato Kilman
- Preceded by: Yoan Simon
- Succeeded by: Yoan Simon

Minister of Lands
- In office 18 February 2011 – 10 March 2011
- Prime Minister: Sato Kilman
- Preceded by: Harry Iauko
- Succeeded by: Alfred Carlot

Minister of Cooperatives and ni-Vanuatu Business Development
- In office 2 December 2010 – 18 February 2011
- Prime Minister: Sato Kilman
- Preceded by: Dunstan Hilton
- Succeeded by: Esmon Sae

Member of the Vanuatu Parliament for Port Vila
- Incumbent
- Assumed office September 2008

Personal details
- Born: Ralph John Regenvanu; 20 September 1970 (age 56) Suva, Fiji
- Party: Independent, then Land and Justice Party

Ralph John Regenvanu (born 20 September 1970 in Suva, Fiji) is a Ni-Vanuatu anthropologist, artist and politician. He has been a Member of Parliament since September 2008, was a member of Cabinet for most of the period from December 2010 to January 2012 and then from March 2013 to June 2015, and was the Director of the Vanuatu National Cultural Council from 1995 until December 2010.

He has been a leading figure in Vanuatu's cultural world, primarily as a promoter of cultural knowledge preservation and sustainable development as a researcher, but also, to a lesser extent, as a painter and illustrator. He has represented Vanuatu and its culture in the international sphere, notably through UNESCO. His transition to politics came suddenly in 2008, at a comparatively young age; his successful campaign to be elected to Parliament generated popular and media support. As a Member of Parliament, he sought to publicise his activities and discuss political issues directly with members of the public; he also used his parliamentary allowance to help finance student scholarships and youth business projects. Three months after his election, he was arrested and charged with aiding prisoners who had escaped from gaol. The charges were later dropped. In late 2010, he launched his own political party, shortly before being appointed to Cabinet.

From December 2017 to April 2020, he served as Vanuatu's Minister for Foreign Affairs, and sought in particular to mobilise the international community in support for the right to self-determination for the people of West Papua. Since April 2020, he has been Leader of the Opposition in Parliament.

== Early life ==
Ralph was born on 20 September 1970 to Dorothy and Sethy Regenvanu at the Colonial War Memorial Hospital in Suva, Fiji. Sethy Regenvanu, born on Malakula, was later to become a prominent politician in post-independence Vanuatu: Deputy Prime Minister and Minister for Home Affairs in the government of Prime Minister Walter Lini in the 1980s. Dorothy Regenvanu, born Dorothy Rutter in Australia, is a pastor in the Presbyterian Church. Sethy Regenvanu was in Suva to study at the Pacific Theological College when Ralph, his and Dorothy's first child, was born. Ralph was three years old when the family left Fiji to move to Australia, then back to Vanuatu (which at the time was the Franco-British Condominium of the New Hebrides). Ralph eventually had four younger siblings, all brothers: Nikil Periv (b. 1974), Malpati (1975), Regson Tairets (1982), and George Michael (1984).

== Work in the field of culture ==
Regenvanu studied anthropology, archeology and development studies at the Australian National University, obtaining an Honour's degree in development studies in 1991, before becoming curator of the National Museum of Vanuatu. Les Nouvelles calédoniennes describes him as "Vanuatu's first anthropologist".

In 1994, he was a founding member of the Pacific Islands Museums Association, and was a member of its inaugural executive board from 1997 to 2009.

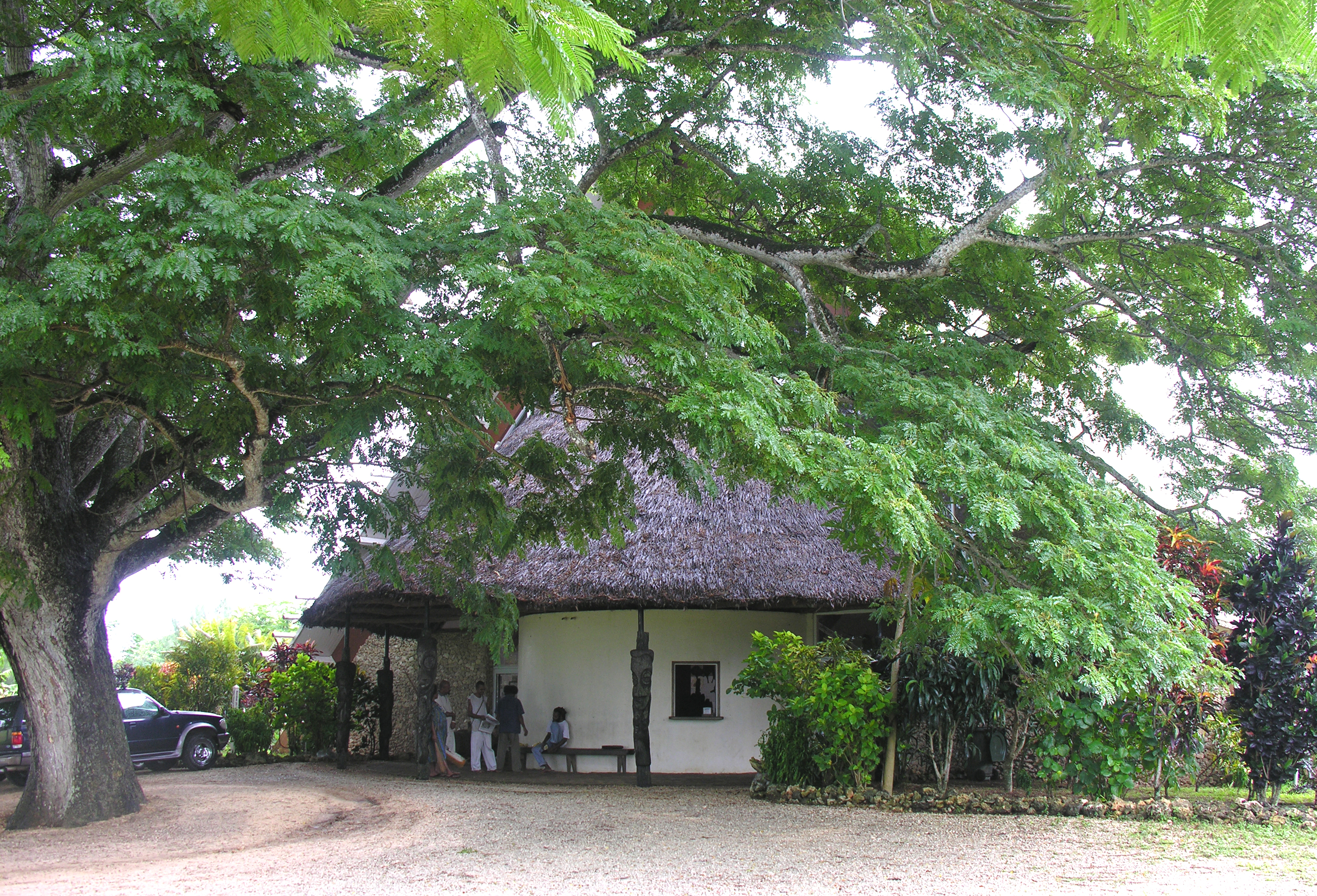
The Vanuatu Cultural Centre, of which Regenvanu was director for eleven years

From 1995 to 2006, he was the director of the Vanuatu Cultural Centre, and was subsequently tasked with overseeing Vanuatu's ongoing "Year of the Traditional Economy" (2007 and 2008), in accordance with a government policy which aimed at preserving, maintaining and revitalizing elements of the or reviving traditional indigenous economics. In 1992, he helped formulate the Vanuatu Cultural Research Policy which became effective in 1993 and has been a prominent advocate for the protection of the country's biodiversity. He has advocated the use of customary law -as opposed to a legal system derived from British and French models- in the juvenile justice sector. He has stated that, although the Constitution recognises both "traditional Melanesian values" and Christianity as the bases of contemporary ni-Vanuatu society, the latter tends to overshadow the former. He has attempted to highlight the importance of indigenous customs and their present-day relevance. The Vanuatu Daily Post describes him as "a world authority on custom".

In 1996, he spearheaded the setting up of Fest'Napuan, an annual musical festival, described by the Vanuatu Tourism Office as "the premier cultural event of the year", and by the Vanuatu Daily Post as "one of the major music festivals in the South Pacific". In 2010, the festival lasted five days and attracted an audience of over 30,000 people. In the past, it has attracted musicians from New Caledonia, the Solomon Islands, Fiji, West Papua, Easter Island, Papua New Guinea, Australia and New Zealand, and in 2004 it was broadcast live by the Australian Broadcasting Corporation. In 2010, Regenvanu remained active in organising the festival, presiding over the Fest' Napuan Association, and announcing that that year's theme would be "Women in Music", to promote female musicians from around the Pacific and to combat gender bias in the music industry.

In 1998, he began working in collaboration with UNESCO as a delegate of Vanuatu and of the Pacific Islands more generally. Since then, he has represented Vanuatu in a number of international conferences. As of 2003, he was Secretary of the Executive Council of the Pacific Islands Museums Association (PIMA). As of 2007, he was a member of the Advisory Committee of Experts for the UNESCO World Report on Cultural Diversity. He has also been a jury member assessing potential items for UNESCO's Masterpieces of the Oral and Intangible Heritage of Humanity list.

In 2004, Regenvanu initiated the process to have sites associated with Roy Mata inscribed as a UNESCO World Heritage Site, the first in Vanuatu, which was accomplished in 2008. He had also been involved in unearthing another site, which contains "the oldest graves in the Pacific region" and the "only Lapita-era cemetery" found anywhere so far.

In 2005, the projects he was working on included a "project to strengthen the traditional economy and the use of traditional wealth items in Vanuatu"; a "project to revitalise sand drawings"; the Fest’Napuan; and "strengthening the Pacific Islands Museums Association", of which he was a board member.

In April 2005, when the Malvatu Mauri (National Council of Chiefs) imposed a ban on the custom of the bride price, he organised a meeting of chiefs aimed at finding "a realistic balance between tradition and modernity" in the customs of contemporary Vanuatu.

In June 2006, as director of the Vanuatu Cultural Centre, he participated in a discussion on the ownership of cultural objects, organised by the Musée du Quai Branly in Paris.

On 10 November 2006, he was awarded the title of Chevalier dans l'Ordre des Arts et des Lettres (Knight in the Order of Arts and Letters) by the government of France, for his work in the field of culture, and more specifically for his years of work with the Vanuatu Cultural Centre. Seven days later, he was awarded the title Libehkamel Tah Tomat (Caretaker of the Sacred Nakamal (men's house)) by Chief Matthias Batick of the Nende people of South West Bay, Malakula. The Vanuatu Cultural Centre explains that the title "comes with his attainment of the first grade in one of the traditional grade-taking systems" of the region. Regenvanu retired as Director of the Cultural Centre in December 2006, and subsequently entered politics. In December 2010, upon being appointed as a State Minister, he resigned as Director of the Vanuatu National Cultural Council. However, he continues to combine his interests in the cultural field with his political career.

In June 2009 at a meeting of several Melanesian community groups in Madang (Papua New Guinea) Ralph Reganvanu co-founded MILDA (the Melanesian Indigenous Land Defence Alliance). He presided over a second MILDA meeting at Mele Village (Efate, Vanuatu) in June 2009. He remains active in the defence of customary land systems.

In January 2010, he attended the opening of a new building at the Museum of Anthropology in Vancouver, as the official representative of "every museum in the Pacific". His invitation was due to his having been "heavily involved in the preparation for the Pacific Islands exhibition".

In February 2015, he was selected to represent the Pacific Islands on the advisory board of the Australian National University's language research centre.

== Political career ==
=== Entry in politics ===
Pacific Magazine stated in April 2008 that "Regenvanu is seen as one of Vanuatu's future political leaders", while the Vanuatu Daily Post described him in April 2009 as an "upcoming leader". When he announced his intention to stand for election to Parliament, the Daily Post expressed the following opinion, which garnered favourable comments from readers' feedback:

"It will not be easy but if Regenvanu can get young people behind him and voting in numbers as well as women and people who are fed up with seeing the same politicians come into power and achieving little, then he could pave the way for a new trend of highly educated Ni Vanuatu politicians to enter politics and see change that everyone wants."

Les Nouvelles calédoniennes, a New Caledonian newspaper, emphasised his relative youth (he was 37), the fact that he was a new voice in politics, and his apparent public support.

He had previously received support from The Vanuatu Independent in 2008, upon first announcing his entrance into a political career. The newspaper, describing him as a "young visionary and idealist", had written of him: "It is a long time since we have had a charismatic leader emerge from the crowd. [...] Whatever he does, he will do it well."

=== First term as Member of Parliament ===
Ralph Regenvanu

Member of Parliament
- In office 2008–2012
- Constituency: Port Vila

Personal details
- Party: Independent, then Land and Justice Party

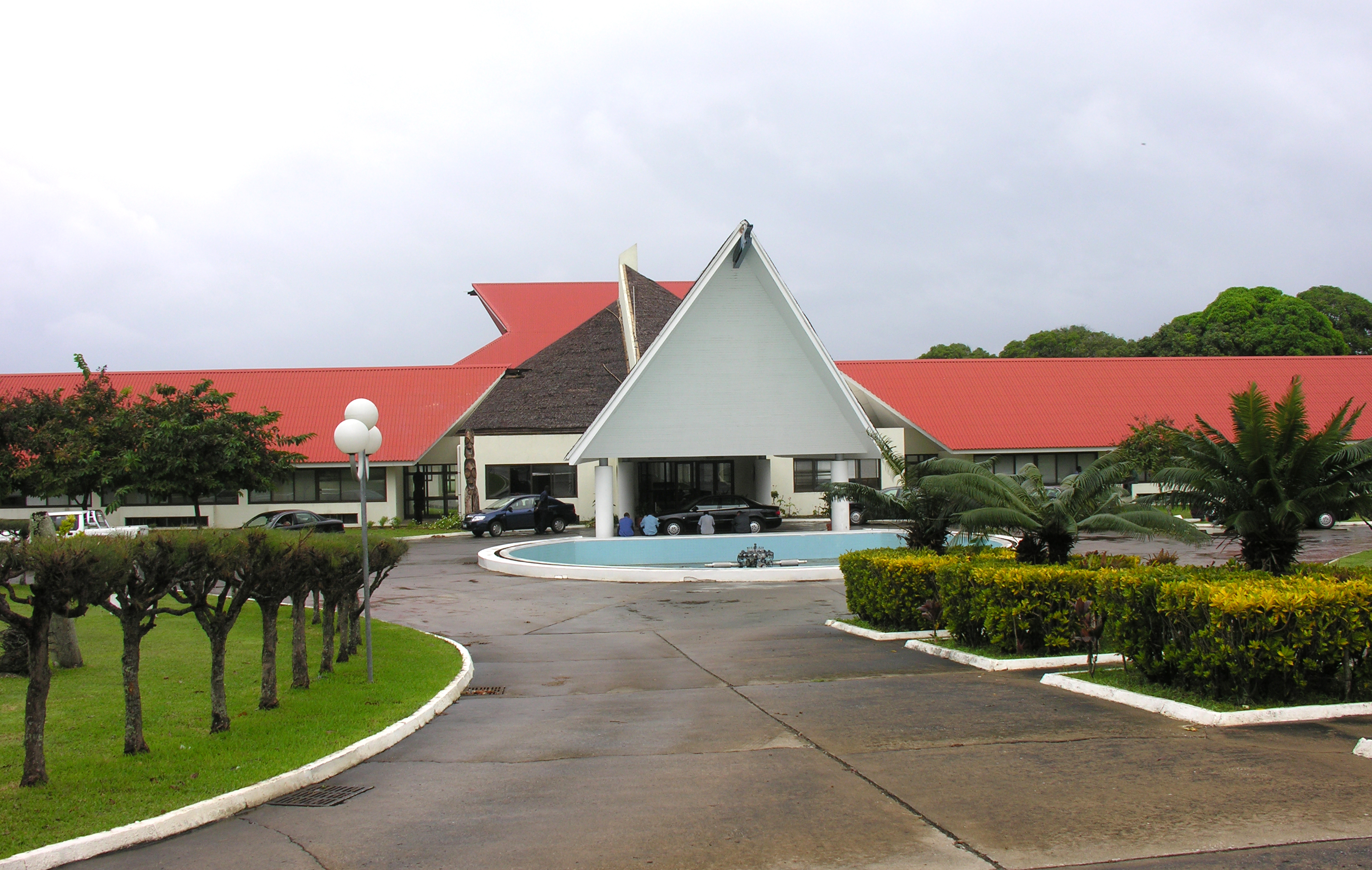
The Parliament of Vanuatu

He was elected to Vanuatu's parliament representing Port Vila as an independent candidate on 2 September 2008. Les Nouvelles calédoniennes and Islands Business reported that he had received a record high number of votes. Transparency International Vanuatu applauded his election and his first days in office:

"Port Vila MP Ralph Regenvanu was elected by the “Protest Vote” – essentially by those people who were sick and tired of the traditional politics, and it is encouraging to see him exercising his mandate. This is democracy at work [...]. It is an encouraging sign that a member of the Opposition in Parliament is doing what is normally expected in properly functioning democracy - namely to highlight discrepancies between Government statements and Government actions."

Despite remaining an independent, Regenvanu described politicians Ephraim Kalsakau and Moana Carcasses as people "I can work with and have respect for". Caracasses is leader of the Green Confederation, and was -in the immediate aftermath of the election- whip of the parliamentary Opposition to Prime Minister Edward Natapei's government. The press initially described Regenvanu as being a member of the Opposition. Following a Cabinet reshuffle in November 2009, however, he became part of a new parliamentary majority supporting Prime Minister Natapei, as member of "The Alliance" political bloc headed by Sato Kilman, who was appointed deputy prime minister and Minister for Trade in the November Cabinet reshuffle. The Alliance, supporting the government, consisted in MPs from a variety of small parties (including Carcasses' Green Confederation) and three independent MPs. Regenvanu, who did not seek a role in Cabinet, then described himself as a government backbencher; he was also described as "an independent MP in the government coalition" and a "government MP", though he was not a member of Cabinet.

In January 2009, he announced that he would use part of his allowance as Member of Parliament to set up and finance scholarships for students undertaking Foundation-level studies at the University of the South Pacific in Port Vila. In March, twelve students were selected to receive financial assistance under his scholarship scheme. The initiative was praised by the head of the university's Vanuatu campus. The following year, nineteen more scholarships were awarded under the scheme he was continuing to fund, now with the assistance of an anonymous Australian donor. The year after that, in 2011, twelve more students received scholarships funded from his allowance.

Also in March 2009, Regenvanu began to finance a "Youth Solidarity Micro-Credit Scheme" out of his parliamentary allocation, providing loans to assist several young people in setting up "small business projects". This was in keeping with his campaign promise that he would attempt to encourage emerging local businesses. He subsequently continued to personally fund programmes from his parliamentary allowance. In 2010, he donated 200,000 vatu (one tenth of his annual allowance) to a campaign to clean up litter in Port Vila. The same year, he donated 50,000 vatu and a printer to the Port Vila Town Youth Council, to register and promote youth groups. In February 2012, he donated rainwater catchment material to a community on Espiritu Santo.

In February 2009, he participated in a symposium entitled "Building successful partnerships: Government, the Academy, Industry and Civil Society in the Changing Pacific", at Deakin University in Australia. He had been invited to participate "in recognition of his leading role in building partnerships between Government, research institutions and civil society in Vanuatu".

Also in February, he criticised what he described as an excessively short period of notice given to MPs before a parliamentary debate on a number of bills:

"How is it possible for MPs to consult with their constituencies about the bills if they have not yet received them less than a week before Parliament is due to sit to discuss them? If MPs cannot consult with their electorates about the bills, how can they properly represent their views about these bills which will become laws that will affect their day-to-day lives? Such late notice and late provision of the bills demonstrates that the Government is not at all committed to the "stampa" principle of democracy and good governance, which is the representation of the people by leaders they elect to represent them. It reflects the Government’s attitude that because it has a majority in Parliament - which means its bills will automatically be passed - there is no need for the grassroots to know about these laws that it intends to pass, which will nevertheless affect their lives. This is an arrogant and undemocratic attitude which, unfortunately, has come to characterize our system of parliamentary democracy and particularly the approach of the major parties which have been in Government over the last 20 years. [...] I have been telling communities in Port Vila that I will consult with them about the 2009 Government budget, to get their views to present in Parliament, and I am very disappointed and angry that the Government, by their late notice, has meant that this will be very difficult, if not impossible."

On 4 May, Regenvanu relaunched a weekly radio programme, "Traem Tingting Smol", which he had initially started in early 2008, to discuss political topics affecting people's lives. The programme would discuss such issues with guests, as well as with listeners, encouraged to "ring in to ask questions or give their views". Among the initial topics for discussion were the prospect of Vanuatu joining the World Trade Organization; a fishing plant; and a large loan to Vanuatu from the Chinese government. "Traem Tingting Smol" is Bislama for "try and think a little".

On 22 May, Regenvanu was publicly criticised and ridiculed in Parliament by Internal Affairs Minister Patrick Crowby and Minister for Lands Harry Iauko, who read out an e-mail Regenvanu had been circulating, in which the young MP broadly accused his fellows of widespread corruption. He had also stated in the e-mail that Speaker of Parliament Maxime Carlot Korman would be "buried" if he attempted to stand in the 2012 general election. Carlot Korman addressed Regenvanu in these terms: "I, along with your father are veteran politicians. I want you to explain to me what you mean when you say you are going to bury me." Regenvanu was compelled by the Speaker to offer an apology.

In 2010, following a coronial report which accused police commissioner Joshua Bong of human rights abuses, and of attempting to "derail the coroner's inquest" into a prisoner's death in custody, Regenvanu publicly described Bong as "a thug who disregards the law", calling for his removal.

The same year, Regenvanu was named vice-chairman of the Independence Celebrations Task Force Committee, entrusted with preparations for the country's celebration of its anniversary of independence. He was also a member of the parliamentary Public Accounts Committee investigating a misappropriation of public funds by public servants. The committee's findings resulted in official charges being laid against three public servants.

In November, he protested publicly against a change in the way constituency funds were allocated to MPs. He argued that, under the new rules, there was no longer any meaningful accountability, as the funds were now to be paid directly into MPs' salaries. Regenvanu argued that this amounted to an unjustified 83% salary increase for MPs. He successfully moved that a nominal vote be taken on the issue, but was one of just seven MPs to vote against what the Daily Post also described as an increase in MPs' salaries.

At the close of 2010, the Fiji-based Islands Business praised him as "an outspoken opponent of corruption"; "in the Public Accounts Committee, he is unflinching in his attempts to wrench the facts from those on the witness stand".

Alain Simeon, of the Vanuatu Broadcasting and Television Corporation, said of him in January 2012 that he was "one of the first MPs to use social media to campaign and to keep voters well informed of political developments", adding that he had "huge support in the local community".

=== Arrest in December 2008 ===
In December 2008, thirty inmates of Vanuatu's main prison in Port Vila escaped after starting a fire in the prison. Regenvanu announced that he had received word in advance of the jailbreak attempt, from the prisoners themselves. He stated that he had found twenty-six of the escaped prisoners and taken them to the Malvatu Mauri nakamal, where they would be cared for by "community leaders". He stated that they had been ill-treated while in prison, and that they feared being beaten by prison staff if they returned. The prisoners were re-arrested and taken back to prison. On 19 December, Regenvanu and fellow Member of Parliament Moana Carcasses were arrested, detained for 24 hours, and charged with aiding the prisoners in their escape. Among the charges were "harbouring and aiding of prisoners", "obstructing police on duty" and "accessory after the fact" to the breakout. They were released, provisionally, and appeared in court in February 2009. It was subsequently announced by the Supreme Court that they would face charges of "harbouring prisoners" and "obstructing police duty" on 20 March.

Appearing in front of the Supreme Court on that date, Regenvanu pleaded not guilty to "three counts of accessory after the fact, harboring or assisting a prisoner and obstructing police officers on duty". He was released on bail, and it was announced he would reappear in Court on 13 May.

On 7 May, he and Moana Carcasses attended the funeral of a prison inmate who had died "under the custody of the Vanuatu Mobile Force".

On 13 May, he again pleaded not guilty in court, to the same charges as previously. He was scheduled to return to court for pre-trial on 5 August.

In January, Prime Minister Edward Natapei's government stated that it would consider seeking Regenvanu's and Carcasses' suspension from Parliament over the charges. They would, in any case, be likely to lose their seats if found guilty.

In September 2009, the Supreme Court dropped all charges against Regenvanu and Carcasses that had been filed in the wake of the prison break.

Despite these events, a Cabinet reshuffle in December 2009 resulted in Carcasses joining Natapei's government as Minister of Internal Affairs and Labour, while Regenvanu became "an independent MP within the governing coalition", supporting Natapei.

In May 2010, six escaped prisoners asked to talk to Regenvanu, telling the police they were willing give themselves up if the request were granted. Regenvanu later told the press:

"Police came to my house on Sunday at 1pm when I was having my siesta and told me that the escapees had demanded to see me before they gave themselves up to the police voluntarily. I was reluctant because last time I helped the police I was arrested but I agreed if it meant they would give themselves up, so I went with two officers to Tanoliu.

Six of the escapees were there and we talked for about three hours with me trying to persuade them to come back. They told me that they had sent a letter to the Minister of Justice Bakoa Kaltongga, complaining that they had been at 'Container City' since June in very confined areas, not allowed visitation rights and had no chance to see their chiefs for rehabilitation.

They told me that they had been refused medical care and had other requests unanswered and that other high risk prisoners had been moved out of container city to other prisons but not them and they felt it was unfair. They said that they were not allowed to exercise and were demanding to be relocated to another prison and that was the reason behind their escape."

Regenvanu passed on the prisoners' concerns to the relevant authorities and to the media, but did not obtain the surrender of all six.

=== Parliamentary motion on West Papua ===
In 2010, Regenvanu was instrumental in the tabling of a motion in Parliament stating that Vanuatu would request the support of the sixty fifth session of the General Assembly of the United Nations for the International Court of Justice to provide an advisory opinion on the legality of the agreement between the Republic of Indonesia and the Kingdom of the Netherlands affecting the civil rights and lives of the people of West Papua. The motion was adopted unanimously by Parliament in June, having been moved by the Prime Minister Edward Natapei and seconded by the opposition leader Maxime Carlot Korman, along with their respective parties.

The decision received a favourable comment from the monthly Fiji-based regional business magazine Islands Business, which praised it as "forward thinking", and added: "[I]f and when West Papua gets the independence and self rule it deserves, its people will have much to feel grateful to its Melanesian brethren across the Coral Sea".

Regenvanu subsequently criticised Papua New Guinea for having "consistently" opposed discussion of West Papua within the Melanesian Spearhead Group, "against the wishes of other Melanesian countries". Papua New Guinea borders the Papua province of Indonesia, one of the provinces in West Papua region. He added: "We want to raise international attention to the issue of West Papua", saying also that he hoped it would not compromise Vanuatu's relations with Indonesia.

=== Launch of own party ===
In November 2010, Regenvanu launched his own political party, in preparation for the 2012 general election. The Land and Justice Party (in Bislama, Graon mo Jastis Pati (GJP)) aimed to facilitate young people's participation in politics. Regenvanu argued that the executive of existing parties was controlled by veteran politicians, inhibiting the rise of new, younger politicians. Regenvanu stated that a core objective of the party would be "to try and put good leaders into parliament and into politics at all levels. And by that I mean leaders who are prepared to put the public interest first". In addition, the party would campaign on strengthening the guarantee of indigenous land ownership, and on promoting and facilitating indigenous participation in business.

Islands Business expressed its support for the new party. It reported Regenvanu as stating that chiefs, churches, women and youth were the four solid legs of the Land and Justice Party, and added that the party did indeed seem to be supported by youth - but also by "mums and dads, chiefs and pastors who have maintained the debate against corruption (and the falling standards in public life), whether in the home, the church or the nakamal, or in print, for a very long time". It concluded that Regenvanu was widely "seen as a future leader" for Vanuatu.

=== Appointment to Cabinet ===
==== Minister for Cooperatives and ni-Vanuatu Business Development ====
In December 2010, Edward Natapei's government was ousted by a motion of no confidence in Parliament, and Sato Kilman succeeded him as prime minister. Regenvanu was among those who crossed the floor to form the new parliamentary majority, and consequently obtained a post in Cabinet: Kilman appointed him Minister of Cooperatives and ni-Vanuatu Business Development, issues which Regenvanu's party had stated as priorities.

In early February 2011, he was described as "instrumental", along with Minister for Trade Ham Lini, in preparing a bill to introduce a Copyright Act in Vanuatu, with an aim to protect the intellectual property of artists.

Later summing up his policies as Minister for ni-Vanuatu Business, he said he had amended the method of appointment of the Registrar of Cooperatives to ensure it would be based on merit. He added that he had formulated a policy to restrict "the location and manner in which foreigners could establish retail and wholesale shops in Vanuatu", in order to safeguard local businesses, but that he had been reshuffled out of the ministry before it could be implemented.

==== Minister for Lands ====
On 18 February, Prime Minister Kilman reshuffled his Cabinet following the defections of two ministers. Regenvanu was appointed Minister for Lands, while backbencher Esmon Sae succeeded him as Minister for ni-Vanuatu business.

As Minister for Lands, he was able to initiate a reform of procedures for land leases, which he had been advocating. His ministry announced at the start of March 2011 that "new applications for registration of land leases of customary land w[ould now] require consent from an entire landowner clan, not just individuals". This would enable greater transparency, and would protect communal landowners from having their lands signed away by a small number of individuals. It would prevent leases "that breach planning [or] foreshore requirements", and prevent what Transparency International and Oxfam had called "corrupt land deals" under previous Lands Ministries, whereby (in Regenvanu's words) land was "sold for peanuts" or by "the wrong landowners". Three thousand land leases were put on hold for investigation - a decision which was reportedly "welcomed by members of the public but [...] prompted legal proceedings against the state by land owners".

The Opposition, led by Edward Natapei, reacted favourably to Regenvanu's appointment to the Ministry of Lands, saying that, unlike his predecessors, Regenvanu would "uphold the legal process in land dealings". The Times of Tonga, reprinting an article from the Vanuatu Daily Post, noted: "The reshuffling of Port Vila’s outspoken anti-corruption Minister Ralph Regenvanu, from the Ministry of Ni-Vanuatu Business to the Ministry of Lands comes as a breath of relief and [has been] widely applauded by the grassroots."

On 10 March, however, Regenvanu was reshuffled to the Ministry of Justice and Social Affairs . Prime Minister Kilman had just sacked Justice Minister Yoan Simon, who had "reportedly backed the opposition’s plans for a motion of no confidence" in him, and needed to shore up his coalition government by bringing in a new party. Kilman offered a Cabinet position to the Republican Party, who demanded the Lands Ministry. Consequently, Alfred Carlot replaced Regenvanu as Minister for Lands, while Regenvanu was appointed to the vacant position of Minister for Justice. Ben Bohane, of the Pacific Institute of Public Policy, remarked that Regenvanu seemed to have been "sacrificed to allow the [Republican Party] to come in as a coalition partner for the government. The government's numbers are very shaky. Parliament is set to resume some time at the end of this month and again there is ongoing talk of a vote of no confidence." Radio New Zealand International, describing Regenvanu as a reformer during his three weeks as Minister for Lands, noted: "Reliable sources from the office of the opposition say Mr Kilman had no choice but to make the reshuffle to stay in power." Radio Australia noted that he had been "transferred due to political pressure", as the government tried to maintain a viable parliamentary majority. It added that Regenvanu was "not happy about leaving before finishing significant changes to the laws on land ownership". Carlot said he would continue Regenvanu's reforms aimed at rooting out and prevent corrupt practices.

On 20 March, the Vanuatu Daily Post issued an article saying it had "seen a number of documents relating to land transactions started by former Minister of Lands Harry Iauko and involving the present MP for Efate Rural, Joshua Kalsakau". These documents "appear[ed] to explain prima facie why the Labour Party signed or was alleged to have signed the most recent motion of no confidence in Prime Minister Sato Kilman, and why the Labour Party Minister and MPs were subsequently removed from the coalition and the Vanuatu Republican Party brought in, which resulted in the reshuffle of the Ralph Regenvanu from the Lands portfolio". Kalsakau, the article said, had applied for a land lease which Iauko, as Minister for Lands, had approved "without the normal administrative processes". The transaction was, along with all other pending leases, frozen by Regenvanu when he took office as Minister for Lands, for investigation. The Daily Post stated:

"Minister Regenvanu was repeatedly approached by Ministers of State and by government MPs saying [...] he, Regenvanu, had to sign these leases or the government would face a confidence vote. [...] Minister Regenvanu has also confirmed he was rung repeatedly by MP Kalsakau demanding registration of his leases. [...] Regenvanu took [one of the lease issues] to the Council of Ministers on 10 March: "I don't want the land to be registered because it is public land, it is a green space where adults and children go for relaxation. Generations of residents of Port Vila have enjoyed this beach. It is immoral for us to register the lease". [...] By this time, [...] the Labour Party Minister and MPs had already signed the motion and negotiations to bring the Vanuatu Republican Party in to replace the Labour Party were being concluded. The Vanuatu Republican Party’s support for Prime Minister Kilman was conditional on them holding the Lands portfolio. That same afternoon, Labour Party Minister of Justice Ioane Simon was sacked, VRP MP Hon. Alfred Carlot sworn in as new Minister of Lands and Regenvanu transferred to Justice."

==== Minister for Justice and Social Affairs ====
Upon taking office as Minister of Justice, Regenvanu issued the following statement:

"As a new Justice Minister I have decided to reform the following systems that have never been properly addressed and left there too long and that has not helped to deliver the proper services to the people of Vanuatu. These include reforming: Customary Lands Tribunal system which is no different from the justice system and is inappropriate, the Custom Governance for the Chiefs to allow this to be properly functional at all levels of the communities in Vanuatu and still require major work to complete, raise a better standard for women, children and people with disabilities in Vanuatu, improve the way of dealing with people who commit crimes in Vanuatu through the Correctional Services and reform the national constitution and other laws of the country that need to be changed through law reform process."

He added that he would also assist Alfred Carlot in pursuing the reforms he had initiated as Minister for Lands.

Less than two weeks after taking office, he issued a call, "together with a group of chiefs and fellow politicians", for the "descendants of 'blackbirding' victims living in Australia" to receive Vanuatu citizenship. Later, in October, he reiterated the call, while in Queensland to chair a meeting bringing together a Vanuatu delegation and descendants of "blackbirded" Melanesian workers in the second half of the 19th century, with an aim for the latter to form a nationally representative body for the community. Regenvanu added he would like Australia to grant seasonal work visas to citizens from Vanuatu.

On 24 April (Easter Sunday), Sato Kilman's government was ousted by a motion of no confidence in Parliament, by twenty-six votes to twenty-five. Serge Vohor became prime minister in his place, and appointed a new Cabinet which included neither Regenvanu nor any other of Kilman's ministers. Yoan Simon, Regenvanu's predecessor, succeeded to the Justice ministry, while Dominique Morin (of the Republican Party) obtained the Ministry of Lands.

On 13 May, the Court of Appeal voided Vohor's election (and therefore his premiership), deeming it unconstitutional as he had been elected only by a majority of Members of Parliament (26 out of 52), not by an absolute majority. The premiership reverted to Sato Kilman, and the latter's ministers resumed their posts - although Kilman did not appear to have a parliamentary majority. Regenvanu stated that since Vohor and his cabinet were "illegal, null and void and were never the government of the country", the Kilman government had de jure been legitimate during the brief interlude of Vohor's de facto government. On 16 June, however, Chief Justice Vincent Lunabek, in the Supreme Court, ruled that Kilman's premiership was itself null and void, Kilman's election in December not having respected constitutional requirements for a parliamentary secret ballot. Regenvanu lost office on that date. He regained it on 26 June when Kilman was restored as prime minister by Parliament, and reinstated his Cabinet.

In September, Regenvanu announced that the Customary Land Tribunal would, for the time being, no longer be hearing any new cases, pending reforms. Recommendations from the Malvatumauri (National Council of Chiefs) would be examined with a view to ensuring that "power in lands matters goes back to the customary authorities and village courts", in accordance with the Constitution, which states that land ownership and usage is to be determined by custom. Thus he was able to pursue his policies on land, despite having been reshuffled to the Justice ministry. This was made possible by the enacting, the previous month, of the Customary Land Tribunal (Amendment) Act, a bill introduced to Parliament by Lands Minister Steven Kalsakau, which transferred jurisdiction for the Land Tribunal from the Lands Ministry to the Justice Ministry.

In late November, Regenvanu stated in Parliament that, despite being a government minister, he would vote with members of the opposition against ratification of Vanuatu's accession to the World Trade Organization, because many of his constituents opposed it, and because he himself had always opposed it. He did indeed vote against it in Parliament on 1 December, but Vanuatu's accession to the WTO was ratified by 26 votes to 21.

As Justice Minister, Regenvanu also set up a commission of inquiry to determine why the recommendations of coroner Nevin Dawson regarding the death of a man in custody in 2010 -a report "scathingly critical of Vanuatu police"- had never been acted upon. The commission, however, was stopped almost immediately as police commissioner Joshua Bong sought a judicial review of it. In 2010, before becoming a minister, Regenvanu had already accused Bong of trying to "derail the coroner's inquest" into the prisoner's death in custody.

On 16 January 2012, Regenvanu received a letter from Prime Minister Kilman terminating his position as minister. Regenvanu said the letter accused him of being disloyal to the government, without further explanation, although he thought it might be due to his having voted against Vanuatu's entry in the World Trade Organization. He described his sacking as "appropriate", as no minister in the country's history had ever voted against a government bill before, but said that he did not regret voting against WTO accession, as he had voted in accordance with the wishes of people. He added that, being outside the cabinet, he would now "be able to be much more critical of government policy and ask questions - something I wasn't able to do as a minister". In a press release shortly thereafter, he evoked the other reasons which might have led to his dismissal, presenting himself as a conviction politician who had opposed government decisions he saw as wrong:

I [...] did not support the recent Council of Ministers decision to appoint Mme Titam Ghoiset as Roving Ambassador to Russia with a 15% commission on any money she obtains for Vanuatu, so this may be another of my transgressions.
I have also spoken publicly, in political awareness campaigns, about my opposition to the use of Government funds to increase the salaries and benefits of politicians. [...] I have also publicly stated my opposition to the recent decision [...] to provide new cars at Government expense to four MPs: the First and Second Deputy Speakers, the Leader of Government Business and the Government Whip [...], at a time when many teachers and nurses are still waiting to receive outstanding salaries owed to them. This may be another of my transgressions.
Also, in December last year, I wrote to the Prime Minister asking that Vanuatu not enter into any further relations with Indonesia given the massive human rights violations being committed by the Indonesian army in West Papua in that same month: a few days after receiving my letter the Prime Minister traveled to Indonesia to sign a Development Cooperation Agreement with that country which purports to prevent the Vanuatu Government from talking about the issue of West Papuan independence. The signing of this Agreement has not been endorsed by the Council of Ministers."

A few days later, he formally left the government backbenches and became in independent member once more.

Summing up what he had achieved as Minister for Justice, Regenvanu said he had enabled the salaries of lawyers at the Public Solicitor's Office to match those at the Attorney General's Office, so that "the Public Solicitor can now attract and retain quality lawyers to serve needy people". He had brought about an amendment of the Law Commission Act "to provide a role for chiefs, churches, women and youth in screening all bills before they came before Parliament". He had begun a draft bill to "return jurisdiction over land disputes to chiefs at the community or 'nakamal' level".

=== Second term as Member of Parliament ===
Ralph Regenvanu

Member of Parliament
- In office 2012–2016
- Constituency: Port Vila

Personal details
- Party: Land and Justice Party

In the October 2012 general election, Regenvanu was re-elected MP for Port Vila, with 2,250 votes, "in excess of 1000 votes more than any other candidate in the country", beating his own previous national record for the highest victory in a parliamentary election. His Land and Justice Party obtained four seats in Parliament. Jenny Hayward-Jones, for the Lowy Institute for International Policy, commented: "The country's young people […] are likely to have their eye on 43-year-old Ralph Regenvanu [...]. He is ambitious and offers a younger constituency a more effective voice in the parliament than that often delivered by the country's leaders. Whether he has what it takes to rise to the top job however, is less certain".

In March 2013, described by the Daily Post as a "popular young leader" on the Opposition benches, he strongly criticised what he saw as the Kilman government's lack of "fiscal responsibility", with a lack of funding for decentralisation or for students' scholarships, while ministers and MPs still had their foreign travels funded. During a speech in Parliament criticising budget priorities, he mentioned Kilman's "directive to the Public Service not to buy any new cars, and then they went and bought 25 million vatu worth of new vehicles. So who is the boss of the Public Service? Are you - the Prime Minister - not the boss?" Highlighting the country's trade deficit, he added: "We see less exports and more imports. Since we joined the WTO, less exports and more imports. Local businesses are breaking down. We spend hundreds of millions of vatu in trade, but what do we do with it? We talk about more development needed in the productive sector, but kill it off". He nonetheless noted the budget safeguards on spending on education and health, and voted in favour of the budget so as not to block necessary spending on public services.

A few days later, the Pacific Institute of Public Policy, describing him as a "populist", noted his "directness, which can be perceived within some quarters as pushing beyond the boundary of the Melanesian culture of respect for authority".

In June 2015, he and his fellow Land and Justice Party MPs (Alfred Maoh, Gillion Williams and Daniel Nalet) published the details of their use of their parliamentary allocation funding for community purposes, most notably "to establish academic scholarships schemes in their constituencies". Informing the public of their use of these funds had been a campaign pledge.

=== Appointment to Cabinet during second term ===
Regenvanu initially sat on the Opposition benches. On 21 March 2013, the government of Prime Minister Sato Kilman fell when it lost the confidence of Parliament, and Regenvanu's ally Moana Carcasses Kalosil became prime minister two days later. Carcasses appointed him Minister for Lands, Geology, Mines, Energy and Water resources. Regenvanu stated "I’ve been preparing for it for a while, to get into this Ministry", adding: "I think eighty percent of my time will be taken up with cleaning up the mess that’s been left". He announced he would pursue the reforms which he had begun to initiate during his previous (brief) term as Minister for Lands. He would once more seek to overhaul and regulate the leasing and selling of public lands.

Shortly after his appointment, he announced his intention to reform land law, to enshrine customary ownership of lands, and ensure that lands could not be leased without the consent of their collective traditional owners. This would be achieved by drawing inspiration from the Australian Northern Territory's Northern Land Council, which is designed to safeguard Aboriginal customary land ownership. Describing himself as a "notorious critic" of free trade and foreign ownership of lands, he added: "New Zealand, Australia and the World Bank are saying that we need to get away from [customary ownership], but I totally disagree. We need to enshrine it so that cultural land-owning groups or land-stewarding groups never lose control of the resource". He suggested that the government should encourage and support an agriculture-based economy, empowering customary land-owners.

As Minister for Lands, he introduced a proposal whereby land leases would necessarily be examined by a committee, thus depriving the ministry itself of the power to lease lands without any external controls. This was a response to alleged acts of corruption carried out by previous ministers. This unprecedented reform was described as part of Regenvanu's ongoing measures against corruption. More generally, his proposals sought to "untangle a whole series of obscure rules on customary landownership", and provide clarity to landowners. The bill based on his proposals was adopted as the Customary Land Management Act in December 2013. Under this law, land ownership is henceforth determined by customary institutions, rather than the ordinary courts. In addition, the Malvatu Mauri (council of chiefs) must be consulted on legislation relating to land. And "the Minister of Land no longer has the power to unilaterally approve any dealings on land"; "every land dealing has to be approved by the Land Management Planning Committee".

He crossed the floor with his party on 15 May 2014 to help bring down the Carcasses government. New prime minister Joe Natuman maintained Regenvanu at his post as Minister for Lands.

Following the devastation caused by cyclone Pam in March 2015, he purchased one million vatu worth of rice to distribute as food relief to his constituents. He lost office on 11 June 2015 when the Natuman government was ousted in a motion of no confidence.

=== Appointment to Cabinet during third term ===
Regenvanu's Land and Justice Party finished in joint first place during the January 2016 general election, obtaining six seats out of fifty-two. He led his party into a large coalition government, under Prime Minister Charlot Salwai. On 11 February, Regenvanu was allocated the Lands and Natural resources portfolio, while fellow party member Alfred Maoh was made Minister for Internal Affairs.

On 19 December 2017, he was reshuffled to the position of Minister for Foreign Affairs and External Trade. In July 2018, in response to rumours that Vanuatu might allow the People's Republic of China to build a military harbour on its territory, Regenvanu denied it, while praising the benefits of Chinese investments in the country, and noting that the story had led to increased Australian engagement with Vanuatu. In September, he urged member states at the Pacific Islands Forum to endorse Vanuatu's initiative to have West Papua added to the United Nations list of non-self-governing territories. While the Forum's ensuing statement merely recognised the need to pursue "constructive engagement with Indonesia with respect to elections and human rights in West Papua", Regenvanu reached out also for support from the Non-Aligned Movement, the African, Caribbean and Pacific Group of States (with bilateral meetings with some of those states' representatives), and the European Union, and succeeded in having the subject placed on the agenda of the Caricom Foreign Affairs Ministers meeting and the African Union Summit. In June 2019 he again urged the Pacific Islands Forum to take a stronger stance on West Papua, and during a meeting with New Zealand Foreign Minister Winston Peters, argued New Zealand could help by pressing Indonesia to allow the Forum to investigate allegations of human rights abuses in the territory.

In early 2019 he was made Chairman of the Task Force on the Constitutional Review, tasked with organising consultations in view of a referendum in June to regulate and stabilise the organisation of political parties in the country.

=== Leader of the Opposition ===
Following the 2020 general election in which the Land and Justice Party obtained more seats (nine) than any other, Regenvanu was the outgoing government's candidate to succeed Charlot Salwai as prime minister. He received the votes of 21 MPs, to 31 for Opposition candidate Bob Loughman (of the Vanua'aku Pati). Loughman became prime minister, while Regenvanu became Leader of the Opposition, leading a coalition which includes the Reunification Movement for Change, the Leaders' Party and the National United Party as well as his own Land and Justice Party.

In June 2020, he introduced a motion in Parliament proposing a six-month 50% cut to the salaries of the Prime Minister, the Leader of the Opposition (himself), the Speaker, the deputy prime minister and all other ministers, and the deputy Leader of the Opposition, as a cost-cutting measure in response to the recession caused by the country having had to close its borders to protect itself from the COVID-19 pandemic.

== Artist ==
Regenvanu is also a painter and illustrator and, in 1996, published an article entitled "Transforming representations: Contemporary art of Vanuatu" in the book "Arts of Vanuatu", which provided the first historical survey of the development of contemporary art in Vanuatu. In 2004, he provided the illustrations for a book on ni-Vanuatu legends produced by the Vanuatu Cultural Centre.

In May 2006, he was an artist in residence at the British Museum, and produced a painting which was subsequently exhibited as part of the traveling exhibition "Treasures of the British Museum". His work has also been featured in The Contemporary Pacific.
