= Foreign relations of Vanuatu =

Vanuatu maintains diplomatic relations with many countries, and it has a small network of diplomatic missions. Australia, France, Japan, New Zealand, the People's Republic of China, South Korea and the United Kingdom maintain embassies, High Commissions, or missions in Port Vila. The British High Commission maintained a continued presence for almost a century, though closed from 2005 until reopening in 2019.

The government's main concern has been to bolster the economy. In keeping with its need for financial assistance, Vanuatu has joined the Asian Development Bank, the World Bank, the International Monetary Fund (IMF). According to ABC Radio Australia, "Foreign policy issues that feature in Vanuatu include wide support for the Free West Papua Movement and broadly for independence throughout Melanesia, the One China Policy and relations with Australia and New Zealand." On the latter topic, guest worker programmes feature prominently.

== History ==
=== 1980s: the Lini policies ===
Vanuatu (formerly the New Hebrides) obtained independence from France and the United Kingdom in 1980. The country's first elected leader, Prime Minister Father Walter Lini, governed Vanuatu from 1980 to 1991, and shaped its initial foreign policy in distinct ways. The key bases of Lini's foreign policy were non-alignment and anti-colonialism, support for independence movements around the world - from faraway Western Sahara to neighbouring New Caledonia, as well as East Timor and West Papua, who all received Vanuatu's support at the United Nations.

Vanuatu notably angered Indonesia by allowing the Free Papua Movement to open an office in Port-Vila. Vanuatu in the 1980s was the only country in Oceania not to align with the Western bloc in the dying stages of the Cold War. Rejecting support either for the West or for the East, Vanuatu joined the Non-Aligned Movement in 1983, and only established diplomatic relations with the Soviet Union and the United States in June and September 1986, respectively.

In keeping with this policy, Vanuatu established diplomatic relations with Cuba in 1983, and with Libya in 1986. Lini openly condemned the 1986 bombing of Libya by the United States, sending a message of condoleances to Colonel Muammar Gaddafi, while Barak Sopé accused the United States of being a State sponsor of terrorism. The same accusation was levelled by Vanuatu against France after the sinking of the Rainbow Warrior. Relations with the United States were tense until the late 1980s, when a State visit to Washington by Lini and Foreign Affairs Minister Sela Molisa contributed to a lessening of tensions. Relations with France remained strained throughout the 1980s for a variety of reasons.

Lini's government opposed French nuclear tests at Mururoa, and spoke out repeatedly against apartheid in South Africa. Vanuatu was a member of the United Nations Special Committee against Apartheid. In 1990, Vanuatu's ambassador to the United Nations Robert Van Lierop remarked proudly: "I think that Vanuatu's contribution to the United Nations is somewhat disproportionate in relation to its size. [...] When the Prime Minister met Nelson Mandela in Namibia, Mandela knew about Vanuatu because it has always been among the countries in the region that have most clearly spoken out on the problem of apartheid".

Vanuatu under Walter Lini also sought to create solid relations with Asia, and, by the end of the decade, had established official diplomatic relations with the People's Republic of China, Japan, South Korea, North Korea, Thailand, Malaysia, Singapore, Vietnam and the Philippines.

=== 1990s: the Carlot Korman and Vohor years ===
Following the 1991 general election, the francophone Union of Moderate Parties became the dominant party in Parliament, and Maxime Carlot Korman became the country's first francophone Prime Minister. He "reversed [the country's] unequivocal support for the Kanak National Liberation Front in New Caledonia, its systematic enmity towards France, its flirting with radical regimes, and its openly anti-American nuclear-free Pacific stance." Francophones held power, under Carlot Korman or Serge Vohor, until 1998.

== Foreign policy issues ==
=== Aid ===
Since 1980, Australia, the United Kingdom, France, and New Zealand have provided the bulk of Vanuatu's development aid. As of March 2008, Australia was Vanuatu's biggest aid provider, followed by France. A number of other countries, including Japan, Canada, Germany, and various multilateral organizations, such as the Economic and Social Council for Asia and the Pacific, the UN Development Programme, the Asian Development Bank, the European Economic Community, and the Commonwealth Development Corporation also provide developmental aid. The United States, Canada, Australia, New Zealand, the United Kingdom, South Korea and Japan also send volunteers. Since the mid-2000s, Cuba has been a noted provider of medical aid.

=== Support to the right of self-determination ===
Vanuatu continues to promote the right to self-determination. In the 1980s, the SADR and Palestine was recognized. Later, Vanuatu recognized Kosovo in 2010 and Abkhazia in 2011. Vanuatu is the only country in the world that recognizes all four of these states. This makes Vanuatu the only country in Oceania to officially recognize each of Palestine, the Sahrawi Arab Democratic Republic and Abkhazia as of August 2025. In addition, Vanuatu strongly supports the Free Papua Movement and its program of self-determination of West Papua, a region in Indonesia, in the midst of Papua conflict. Vanuatu's bringing up the issue at international forums has brought sharp rebukes from Indonesia; according to its diplomats, "it is shameful that [Vanuatu has an] excessive and unhealthy obsession about how Indonesia should govern itself" and states that Vanuatu is "not a representation of the people of Papua, and stop fantasising of being one."

==== Wantok Blong Yumi Bill ====
In June 2010, the Parliament of Vanuatu unanimously gave its support to a motion – the Wantok Blong Yumi Bill – clarifying Vanuatu's foreign policy with regards to West Papuan independence claims from Indonesia. The bill, tabled by Independent MP Ralph Regenvanu and supported by Prime Minister Edward Natapei and opposition leader Maxime Carlot Korman, committed Vanuatu to recognising West Papua's independence; to seeking observer status for West Papua in the Melanesian Spearhead Group and in the Pacific Islands Forum; and to "request[ing] [United Nations] General Assembly support for the International Court of Justice to provide an advisory opinion on the process in which the former Dutch New Guinea was ceded to Indonesia in the 1960s".

== International organizational participation ==
=== Regional relations ===
Vanuatu maintains strong regional ties in the Pacific. It is a full member of the Pacific Islands Forum, the South Pacific Applied Geoscience Commission, the South Pacific Tourism Organisation, the Pacific Regional Environment Programme and the Secretariat of the Pacific Community. Vanuatu is one of the eight signatories of the Nauru Agreement Concerning Cooperation in the Management of Fisheries of Common Interest which collectively controls 25-30% of the world's tuna supply and approximately 60% of the western and central Pacific tuna supply. Vanuatu endorsed the Treaty of Rarotonga (the South Pacific Nuclear Free Zone Treaty) in 1995.

Vanuatu has been a member of the Forum of Small States (FOSS) since the group's founding in 1992.

=== Extra-regional organizational relations ===
Vanuatu has been a member of the Organisation internationale de la Francophonie since 1979 (the year before it gained independence from France). Vanuatu was admitted to the Commonwealth of Nations in 1980 and to the United Nations in 1981. Vanuatu is currently the only Pacific nation that belongs to the Non-Aligned Movement,

Additionally outside the region, Vanuatu is a member or participant of the ACP (Lomé Convention), the Alliance of Small Island States, Asian Development Bank, Economic and Social Commission for Asia and the Pacific (ESCAP), the Food and Agriculture Organization (FAO), the G-77, the International Bank for Reconstruction and Development, the International Civil Aviation Organization, the International Red Cross and Red Crescent Movement, the International Development Association, the International Finance Corporation, the IMF, the International Maritime Organization, the International Olympic Committee, the International Telecommunication Union (ITU), the Universal Postal Union and the World Meteorological Organization. Vanuatu became a member of the WTO in 2012. Vanuatu is also a non-signatory user of Intelsat.

Vanuatu became a member of Interpol in 2018 and is currently a suspended member of the International Hydrographic Organization - since 2019.

On 4 December 2020, Vanuatu became the sixth ever nation to graduate from the United Nations official list of Least Developed Countries (LDC). After meeting graduation thresholds in the Human Assets Index and income in 2006, 2009 and 2012, the UN Committee for Development Policy recommended graduation. The UN Economic and Social Council and UN General Assembly approved of the recommendation in 2012 and 2013, but after Cyclone Pam Vanuatu was granted an extension until 2020. The country lost exclusive access to certain international support measures such as in the areas of development assistance and trade.

== Diplomatic relations ==
List of countries with which Vanuatu has diplomatic relations with:

#	Country	Date
1	France	30 July 1980
2	United Kingdom	30 July 1980
3	Australia	30 July 1980
4	New Zealand	30 July 1980
5	Canada	30 July 1980
6	Fiji	30 July 1980
7	Solomon Islands	30 July 1980
8	Papua New Guinea	30 July 1980
9	Kiribati	30 July 1980
10	Nauru	30 July 1980
11	Tonga	30 July 1980
12	Samoa	30 July 1980
13	South Korea	5 November 1980
14	Japan	8 January 1981
15	Germany	22 April 1981
16	Spain	30 April 1981
17	Belgium	10 June 1981
18	Sweden	27 September 1981
19	North Korea	1 October 1981
20	Cameroon	1 November 1981
21	Vietnam	3 March 1982
22	Netherlands	9 March 1982
23	Nigeria	16 March 1982
24	Italy	23 March 1982
25	China	26 March 1982
26	India	13 April 1982
27	Switzerland	5 May 1982
28	Thailand	2 November 1982
29	Singapore	10 December 1982
30	Cuba	11 March 1983
31	Malaysia	5 April 1983
32	Bangladesh	10 May 1983
33	Sri Lanka	28 September 1983
34	Portugal	30 September 1983
35	Greece	1 June 1984
36	Peru	30 May 1986
37	Libya	30 May 1986
38	Nicaragua	6 June 1986
39	Russia	30 June 1986
40	Ivory Coast	11 July 1986
41	Seychelles	15 July 1986
42	Algeria	15 July 1986
43	Angola	16 July 1986
44	Zimbabwe	15 August 1986
45	Mozambique	6 September 1986
46	United States	30 September 1986
47	Philippines	8 October 1986
48	Mexico	30 October 1986
49	Poland	15 November 1986
50	Tanzania	18 December 1986
51	Brazil	22 December 1986
52	Austria	29 December 1986
53	Togo	21 January 1987
54	Myanmar	28 January 1987
55	Laos	18 February 1987
56	Argentina	13 March 1987
57	Finland	1 April 1987
58	Jamaica	23 July 1987
59	Maldives	27 January 1988
60	Bahamas	27 January 1988
61	Botswana	1 November 1988
62	Tunisia	1 November 1988
—	State of Palestine	17 October 1989
63	Namibia	23 March 1990
64	Federated States of Micronesia	19 April 1990
65	Marshall Islands	1 August 1990
66	Chile	10 September 1990
67	Israel	16 September 1993
—	Holy See	20 July 1994
68	Indonesia	3 July 1995
69	Turkey	14 July 1995
70	Cambodia	26 September 1996
71	South Africa	6 July 1999
72	Ukraine	29 September 1999
73	Croatia	18 April 2000
74	Ireland	7 September 2000
75	Morocco	14 December 2000
76	Mauritius	13 August 2001
77	North Macedonia	16 November 2001
78	Timor-Leste	21 August 2002
79	Qatar	16 September 2002
80	Czech Republic	12 December 2002
81	Iceland	27 September 2004
82	Malta	29 September 2004
83	Nepal	19 September 2006
—	Sahrawi Arab Democratic Republic	31 July 2008
84	United Arab Emirates	23 June 2009
85	Uruguay	6 August 2009
86	Trinidad and Tobago	24 November 2009
87	Luxembourg	24 September 2010
88	Hungary	6 June 2011
89	Egypt	22 September 2011
90	Kuwait	8 November 2012
91	Georgia	12 July 2013
92	Mongolia	23 September 2013
93	Montenegro	25 September 2013
94	Estonia	25 September 2013
95	Armenia	26 September 2013
—	Cook Islands	2013
96	Kazakhstan	19 February 2014
—	Kosovo	19 May 2014
97	Latvia	7 April 2015
98	Slovenia	17 June 2015
99	Lithuania	28 September 2015
100	Pakistan	8 August 2016
101	Venezuela	18 September 2016
102	Azerbaijan	22 September 2017
103	Norway	28 May 2018
104	Romania	31 May 2018
105	Tajikistan	16 August 2018
106	Serbia	28 August 2018
107	Monaco	10 September 2018
108	San Marino	25 September 2018
109	Bosnia and Herzegovina	26 September 2018
110	Ecuador	26 September 2018
111	Costa Rica	28 September 2018
112	Rwanda	3 October 2018
113	Denmark	23 October 2018
114	Bulgaria	24 June 2019
115	Lebanon	25 September 2019
116	Kyrgyzstan	26 September 2019
117	Burundi	6 December 2019
118	Dominica	20 September 2021
119	Tuvalu	12 July 2022
120	Saudi Arabia	8 August 2022
121	Dominican Republic	14 November 2023
122	Oman	17 November 2023
123	Panama	21 November 2023
124	Andorra	30 November 2023
125	Bahrain	9 February 2024
126	Guatemala	4 October 2024
127	Benin	5 June 2025
128	Slovakia	25 September 2025
129	Zambia	21 September 2026
130	Comoros	22 September 2026
131	Uzbekistan	22 September 2026
132	Belize	21 October 2026
133	Cyprus	Unknown

== Bilateral relations ==
Country	Notes
Abkhazia	Main article: Abkhazia–Vanuatu relations On 23 May 2011, Vanuatu became the fifth UN member state (after Russia, Nicaragua, Venezuela and Nauru) to recognise Abkhazia. On this day joint statement on establishment of diplomatic relations was signed. At the same time of signing a visa-free travel regime between the two countries was established. Foreign Affairs Minister Alfred Carlot said that "Vanuatu's foreign policy aims at eradicating colonialism from the face of the earth." In a press release, Carlot stated: "Vanuatu is neutral; our recognition of Abkhazia does not in any way mean that we cannot have diplomatic relations with the Republic of Georgia." The following month, however, the Vanuatuan government of Prime Minister Sato Kilman was voided by the Supreme Court of Vanuatu, on the grounds that Kilman's election in December 2010 had not conformed to constitutional requirements. Former Prime Minister Edward Natapei became interim prime minister until a new leader could be elected. Natapei promptly withdrew Vanuatu's recognition of Abkhazia, arguing that it had been granted by an illegitimate government, and announced that he would seek to establish diplomatic relations with Georgia, recognising its sovereignty over Abkhazia. On 26 June 2011, Sato Kilman was re-elected Prime Minister and on 12 July 2011 Vanuatu's Foreign Minister Alfred Carlot re-confirmed Vanuatu's recognition of Abkhazia. On 12 July 2011 the Ambassador of Abkhazia in the Asia-Pacific region Juris Gulbis stated, that Abkhazia and Vanuatu plans to sign a framework agreement on cooperation in the field of culture, trade and banking sector. According to him, the Government of Vanuatu twice confirmed the establishment of diplomatic relations with Abkhazia and of their intention to contribute to the development of friendly ties between the two States. In 2013, Vanuatu established diplomatic relations with Georgia and recognized Abkhazia as a part of that country.
Armenia	Both countries established diplomatic relations on 26 September 2013. The Prime Minister of the Republic of Vanuatu Charlot Salwai, who visited Armenia on his official visit for the XVII Francophone Summit, gave a visit to the Armenian Genocide Memorial Complex with the accompaniment of Aramayis Grigoryan, the Deputy Minister of Diaspora of the RA. The ni-Vanuatu visitors were welcomed by Harutyun Marutyan, the director of the Armenian Genocide Museum-Institute, who, in his turn, gave a brief introduction to the notable people who previously have visited the complex and the history, as well as the symbolism, of the complex. The Prime Minister of Vanuatu laid a wreath at the Memorial and put flowers at the "eternal fire" which is lit to honour the memory of the innocent victims of the Armenian genocide, with the accompaniment of the delegation. Furthermore, the delegation made a tour around the Memory Wall, got familiar with its meaning and significance. The delegation also visited the Armenian Genocide Museum alongside the Complex and, at the end of their tour, Prime Minister Salwai left a note in the Memory Book of the museum: "In commemoration of the disappeared people of the Armenian Genocide... I express my deep sorrow to the children of the Armenian nation. Let God bless Armenia". The Armenian Genocide Museum-Institute director Harutyun Marutyan awarded the Prime Minister of Vanuatu the Aurora Mardiganyan medal, and the book "Armenian Genocide: Front page Coverage in the World Press".
Australia	Australia and Vanuatu have very strong ties. Australia has provided the bulk of Vanuatu's military assistance, training its paramilitary mobile force and also providing patrol boats to patrol Vanuatu's waters. In 1983, Vanuatu and Australia entered into a Defence Cooperation Program together. As part of this program, two Royal Australian Navy advisers are stationed in Vanuatu Australia to assist Vanuatu in maintaining and operating the RVS Tukoro, the Pacific class patrol boat donated to Vanuatu by Australia in 1987. The RVS Tukoro is Vanuatu's primarily maritime police vessel. Australia also provides assistance to the Mobile Force element of the Vanuatu Police Force (VPF), as well as providing support to exercises and infrastructure projects. Australia is Vanuatu's largest source of foreign direct investment, mostly directed in the areas of tourist development, agriculture and construction. Australia is Vanuatu's largest source of tourists, with Australians making up 2/3 of all long-term tourist visitors and virtually all cruise ship visits. Since 2008, Vanuatu (along with Tonga, Kiribati and Papua New Guinea) has sent seasonal workers to Australia through the Australian government-funded Pacific Seasonal Workers Pilot Scheme (PSWPS). Additionally, Australia is Vanuatu's main source of foreign aid, with the Australian providing A$66 million(US$70.4 million) in 2010–11. In 2004, Australia threatened to cut its aid to Vanuatu when then-Prime Minister Serge Vohor reappointed officials who had been dismissed after being charged with criminal activity. Vanuatu agreed to Australian demands for more transparent government and anti-corruption steps. The result was that from 2005 to 2010, Australian aid was governed through the Australia–Vanuatu Joint Development Cooperation Strategy. This was superseded with the signing in May 2009 of the Australia-Vanuatu Partnership for Development. The central focus of the Partnership is for Australia to assist Vanuatu in achieving its UN Millennium Development Goals (MDG's). The priorities stated in the Partnership are to •support increased access and quality of education for boys and girls and equip them with relevant skills and knowledge •strengthen health services and accelerate progress towards health MDGs •develop essential infrastructure to support economic growth and service delivery •progress reform on economic governance •address equality of opportunity for all men and women and include the needs and priorities of people with disability in development activities (full text of Partnership agreement) On 29 June 2026, Australia and Vanuatu signed a bilateral economic and security agreement barring the establishment of any foreign military base on the island state.
China	See China–Vanuatu relations China established an embassy in Vanuatu in 1989, while Vanuatu established an honorary consulate in China in 1999; it officially became an embassy in 2005. Vanuatu briefly recognized the Republic of China (Taiwan) in late 2004 when on 3 November Prime Minister Serge Vohor signed a communiqué in Taipei with ROC Foreign Minister Mark Chen. Taipei had offered $30 million in aid in return (compared with the $10 million given by the PRC). Under the One-China policy, this would result in the severing of ties with the People's Republic of China. Vohor did so without consultations with his cabinet and the PRC Foreign Ministry, quoting the Vanuatu Foreign Minister, denied ties with the ROC had been established. The Vanuatu Council of Ministers, in the Prime Minister's absence, announced on 11 November that the communiqué had been withdrawn. A spokesman for the Prime Minister denied this a day later. There were reports that previous attempts by Vohor to travel to Taipei were thwarted amid pressure from Beijing so his latest visit was done secretly on purpose. For a period of few weeks, both the PRC and ROC had diplomatic missions posted in Vanuatu while the Vanuatu government was in internal disagreement. At one point Prime Minister Serge Vohor punched the PRC ambassador when approached to explain why the flag of the Republic of China was flying over the hotel where the Taiwanese representative was posted. The standoff ended on 11 December 2004 when the parliament passed a motion of no-confidence against Vohor and replaced him with Ham Lini. In May 2009, Vanuatu appointed its first ever ambassador to China, former Minister of Finance Willie Jimmy. Jimmy "call[ed] [...] for China to have a foot firmly planted in the Pacific through Port Vila", which -the Vanuatu Daily Post remarked- "no doubt caused ruffled feathers among other foreign diplomatic partners". On the Chinese parade due to the 70th Anniversary of the end of World War II, policemen from Vanuatu participated. On 27 February 2017, the Chinese ambassador to Vanuatu, handed over the keys for 14 military vehicles to the Vanuatu Mobile Force. This was done as an effort to safeguard Vanuatu's sovereignty. In 2023, China and Vanuatu established policing ties, with China donating drones, patrol boats and vehicles to Vanuatu's police.
Cuba	See Cuba–Vanuatu relations Vanuatu and Cuba established official diplomatic relations in 1983. In the late 2000s, Vanuatu began to strengthen its relations with Cuba. Cuba provides medical aid to Vanuatu, sending doctors to the country and providing scholarships for ni-Vanuatu medical students to study in Cuba. In September 2008, a representative of the ni-Vanuatu government attended the first Cuba-Pacific Islands ministerial meeting in Havana. The meeting aimed at "strengthening cooperation" between Cuba and Pacific Island countries, notably in coping with the effects of climate change.
Cyprus	Cyprus is represented in Vanuatu by its High Commission in Canberra, Australia.; Both countries are full members of the Commonwealth of Nations.
France	See France–Vanuatu relations: Current relations between France and Vanuatu, as seen by the French Ministry of Foreign Affairs
Georgia	Georgia and Vanuatu established diplomatic relations on 12 July 2013. In 2019, Ralph Regenvanu visited Georgia and signed a cooperation agreement with representatives of the country.
India	See India–Vanuatu relations: Current relations between India and Vanuatu, Indian Ministry of External Affairs; Indian High Commission for Vanuatu accreditation is at Suva, Fiji.; As per the Indo-Vanuatu Pact, Indians do not require a visa to visit Vanuatu
Indonesia	See Indonesia–Vanuatu relations: Both countries established diplomatic relations on 3 July 1995.; Bilateral relations have historically been strained due to Vanuatu's support for the Free Papua Movement.; Indonesia is represented in Vanuatu through its embassy in Canberra, Australia. However, Vanuatu suggested that an Indonesian embassy in Port Vila should be kept apart from the one in Canberra.; Vanuatu has announced plans to open an embassy in Jakarta.
Israel	Vanuatu and Israel established relations in 1993 and relations are conducted through Israel's Ministry of Foreign Affairs in Jerusalem. Vanuatu recognizes Jerusalem as the capital of Israel. In 2021, French diplomat Bernard Leclerc was appointed the Special Envoy to the State of Israel for the Republic of Vanuatu.
Italy	Italy has an honorary consulate in Port Vila.
Libya	See Libya–Vanuatu relations: Vanuatu's foreign policy in the 1980s, under Prime Minister Father Walter Lini, was based on refusing alignment with either bloc in the context of the Cold War, distinguishing it from every other country of Oceania, aligned with the West.
Mexico	Mexico is accredited to Vanuatu from its embassy in Canberra, Australia.; Vanuatu does not have an accreditation to Mexico.
Netherlands	Vanuatu has an honorary consulate in The Hague.
New Zealand	New Zealand has a High Commission in Port Vila.; Vanuatu has a High Commission in Wellington and a consulate-general in Auckland.; Following the 2024 Port Vila earthquake in mid-December 2024, New Zealand dispatched New Zealand Defence Force, Urban Search and Rescue and MFAT personnel, equipment and supplies to assist with post-disaster rescue and relief efforts.
Palestine	Vanuatu recognized the State of Palestine on 21 August 1989. On 19 October 1989 both States established diplomatic relations. Non-resident embassy of Palestine based in Canberra, Australia. In 2011, Vanuatu was one of fifteen countries to oppose Palestine's application to join UNESCO, as part of its bid for greater international recognition. Vanuatu former Foreign Affairs Minister and former chairman of the Vanuatu National Commission for UNESCO Joe Natuman expressed surprise at his country's position, saying it appeared to contradict Vanuatu's long-standing support for Palestine. He raised the issue in Parliament, whereupon Prime Minister Sato Kilman assured him he had not been aware that the country was voting against Palestine's membership of UNESCO, and that he would "review this decision". On that occasion, Kilman reportedly clarified Vanuatu's position with regard to Palestine, saying "Vanuatu will always maintain its position to support the right of the Palestinian people to a homeland but at the same time with Israel existing as a state on its own, with secure borders".
Russia	See Russia–Vanuatu relations: In 1987, Vanuatu authorised Soviet vessels to fish within Vanuatu's Exclusive Economic Zone, in exchange for economic aid. The agreement lapsed the following year, and was not renewed, due to disagreements over the price to be paid for fishing rights by the USSR. In 2021, French diplomat Bernard Leclerc was appointed the Special Envoy to the Russian Federation for the Republic of Vanuatu.
Sahrawi Arab Democratic Republic	Vanuatu recognized the SADR on 27 November 1980, as part of its support to the right of self-determination of the peoples. On 24 November 2000, then Foreign affairs minister Serge Vohor announced that Vanuatu suspended that recognition and established ambassadorial level relations with Morocco. Vanuatu's government made on 1 July 2008 a statement resuming its recognition of the Sahrawi Arab Democratic Republic and established ambassadorial level relations also with SADR. The non-resident embassy of SADR to Vanuatu is based in Dili, East Timor.
South Korea	See South Korea–Vanuatu relations The Republic of Vanuatu and the Republic of Korea have established diplomatic relations on November 5, 1980.: The two countries have good diplomatic relations.
Spain	Spain is accredited to Vanuatu from its embassy in Canberra, Australia.; Vanuatu is accredited to Spain from its embassy in Brussels, Belgium.
Ukraine	Ukraine is represented in Vanuatu by its embassy in Canberra, Australia.
United Kingdom	Vanuatu established diplomatic relations with the United Kingdom on 30 July 1980.: Vanuatu does not maintain a High Commission in the United Kingdom.; The UK is accredited to Vanuatu through its High Commission in Port Vila.; The UK governed Vanuatu jointly with France from 1906 until 1980, when Vanuatu achieved full independence. Both countries share common membership of the Commonwealth, and the World Trade Organization. Bilaterally the two countries have signed an Investment Agreement.
United States	See United States–Vanuatu relations: The United States and Vanuatu established diplomatic relations on 30 September 1986 - three months to the day after Vanuatu had established diplomatic relations with the Soviet Union.
Vietnam	Both countries established diplomatic relations on 3 March 1982. There is a small Vietnamese community in Vanuatu, stemming from the colonial period when Vietnamese indentured workers were bought in by the French.

== See also ==
- List of diplomatic missions in Vanuatu
- List of diplomatic missions of Vanuatu
