= Ensemble Nabanga =

Vanuatu youth musicians

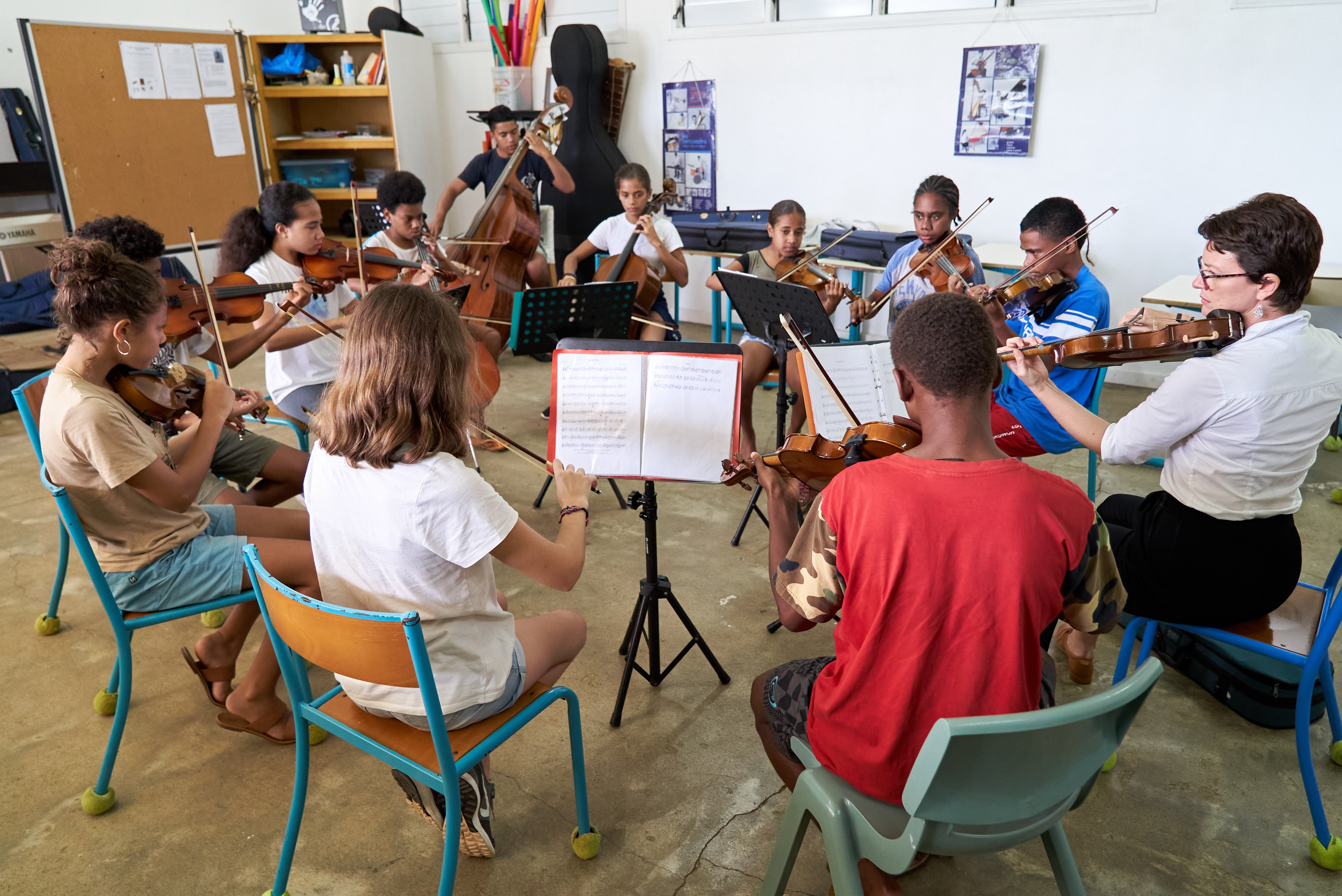
Port Vila, Vanuatu - August 19, 2022 : Ensemble Nabanga, led by Barbara Ididier, rehearses a traditional ni-Vanuatu tune she has arranged for the youth orchestra, in preparation for their first Australian tour in November 2022.

Ensemble Nabanga is a youth orchestra in Port Vila, Vanuatu. Established in 2017, it is inspired by the El Sistema model of providing musical instruments to disadvantaged youth which began in Venezuela and has now spread across the world.

The Ensemble offers strings, woodwind and brass instruments as well as tuition to children in Port Vila, mostly ni-Vanuatu secondary school students. Its name derives from the Banyan tree, renowned for its deep root structure.

Founded and directed by Australian musician and teacher Barbara Ididier, the ensemble is Vanuatu's only musical ensemble playing Western classical music, but also plays transcriptions of traditional ni-Vanuatu folk songs to audiences in Vanuatu and abroad.

In November 2022 they toured to Queensland, Australia, which has a large expatriate ni-Vanuatu population. Their travels were documented in the Australian media, including in by the Australian Broadcasting Corporation's Pacific arm, ABC Pacific and The Guardian among others.

The ensemble survives on fundraising, donations, and support from a local school in Port Vila, Lycée Français Le Clézio.
