= United States–Vanuatu relations =

- United States: Vanuatu

The United States and Vanuatu established diplomatic relations on September 30, 1986 – three months to the day after Vanuatu had established diplomatic relations with the Soviet Union. Relations were often tense in the 1980s, under the prime ministership of Father Walter Lini in Vanuatu, but eased after that. At present, bilateral relations consist primarily in US aid to Vanuatu, and are cordial.

== 1980s ==
=== Early relations and tensions ===
Vanuatu obtained independence from France and the United Kingdom in 1980, and, under the leadership of Prime Minister Walter Lini, set out to establish its own foreign policy as a newly independent State. Lini, an Anglican pastor, forged the doctrine of Melanesian socialism, and based his government's foreign policy on non-alignment and on support for independence movements around the world – from faraway Western Sahara to neighbouring New Caledonia. Vanuatu in the 1980s was unique in Oceania in that it resisted alignment with the Western bloc in the dying stages of the Cold War. The country joined the Non-Aligned Movement in 1983 and established official diplomatic relations with Cuba (1983) and the Soviet Union (June 1986) before doing the same with the United States (September 1986). Vanuatu maintained cordial relations with countries in both East and West.

In 1986, Vanuatu condemned the 1986 bombing of Libya by the United States. Lini wrote to Colonel Muammar Gaddafi to express his condolences, notably at the death of Gaddafi's 15-month-old daughter, and his dismay that "innocent lives have been taken by the bombs of a superpower". Barak Sopé added that "the United States were wrong, they behaved as terrorists and aggressors", and that "the CIA is involved in all sorts of similar activities. In Nicaragua, the Americans are supporting terrorists."

These statements marked the lowest point in U.S.–ni-Vanuatu relations.

In January 1987, Prime Minister Walter Lini and Foreign Affairs Minister Sela Molisa visited Washington, D.C. Lini had been scheduled to meet President Ronald Reagan, but was struck down by cerebral hemorrhage shortly after arriving in the United States. Instead, Molisa met U.S. Secretary of State George Shultz. The two men primarily discussed Soviet–ni-Vanuatu relations, which were of concern to the U.S. government, and sought to build friendship between the United States and Vanuatu. Shultz declared that the meeting had been "cordial", while Molisa praised his knowledge of Pacific issues. In April, Vanuatu authorised U.S. vessels to fish in the ni-Vanuatu Exclusive Economic Zone, alongside Soviet ships. In May, Vernon A. Walters, U.S. ambassador to the United Nations, visited Vanuatu.

In 1991, Lini lost office after eleven years at the head of the ni-Vanuatu government. Relations between Washington and Port-Vila remained infrequent but mostly cordial.

=== US aid ===
Between 1977 and 1987, Vanuatu received just under $3 million from the U.S. Agency for International Development (USAID), including projects focusing on assisting the transition to indigenous plantation management. In June 1994, the regional USAID office located in Suva, Fiji, was closed due to U.S. Government budgetary cutbacks. The U.S. military retains training links and conducts ad hoc assistance projects in Vanuatu.

== 1990s ==
Following the 1991 general election, the francophone Union of Moderate Parties became the dominant party in Parliament, and Maxime Carlot Korman became the country's first francophone Prime Minister. He "reversed [the country's] unequivocal support for the Kanak National Liberation Front in New Caledonia, its systematic enmity towards France, its flirting with radical regimes, and its openly anti-American nuclear-free Pacific stance." Francophones held power, under Carlot Korman or Serge Vohor, until 1998.

== 2000s ==
In March 2006, the United States Millennium Challenge Corporation signed a five-year $65.69 million Compact agreement with Vanuatu. The Millennium Challenge Program is expected to increase average income per capita by 15% within five years and directly impact the lives of more than 65,000 of the rural poor in Vanuatu.

Vanuatu identified costly and unreliable transportation infrastructure as a major impediment to economic growth. To overcome this constraint, the Compact consists of up to eleven infrastructure projects—including roads, wharfs, an airstrip and warehouses—that will help poor, rural agricultural producers and providers of tourist related goods and services reduce transportation costs and improve access to transportation services. The Compact also includes institutional strengthening efforts and policy reform initiatives in Vanuatu's Public Works Department, including: provision of plant and equipment for maintenance; introduction of service performance contracts; establishment of local community maintenance schemes; and introduction of user fees.

The United States also remains a major financial contributor to international and regional organizations that assist Vanuatu, including the World Bank, UNICEF, WHO, the UN Fund for Population Activities, and the Asian Development Bank.

In 1989, the United States concluded a Peace Corps agreement with Vanuatu. The Peace Corps currently has over 80 volunteers in-country. The United States also provides military training assistance.

== 2010s and 2020s ==
In 2023, the United States announced plans to open up an embassy in Vanuatu, as part of a larger regional push to strengthen ties in the Pacific.

== Military relations ==
Prior to Vanuatu's independence, the United States maintained a large naval base in Luganville, in the then-New Hebrides, during World War II, which housed approximately 250,000 soldiers. In June 2018, President Tallis Obed Moses requested that the United States consider reestablishing a military base in Vanuatu.

== Resident diplomatic missions ==
- United States has an embassy in Port Vila.
- Vanuatu is accredited to the United States from its Permanent Mission to the United Nations in New York City.
