= Bernard Leclerc =

Diplomat

His Excellency Bernard LeClerc
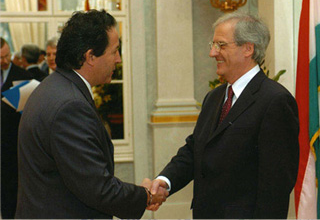
- Bernard LeClerc (left) with the Hungarian President László Sólyom

Ambassador Extraordinary and Plenipotentiary Special Envoy Republic of Vanuatu
- Incumbent
- Assumed office 23 February 2021

Personal details
- Education: National Treasury School; Paris
- Website: www.bernardleclerc2012.com

Bernard Leclerc is the Special Envoy to the State of Israel and to the Russian Federation for the Republic of Vanuatu. He has previously worked as a bank director and as an advisor to the Central African Republic.

== Early life ==
Born in France, Leclerc studied political sciences in California, United States. He has then studied economics, social sciences and European affairs (He graduated with a master's degree in European projects), at the University of Rouen and Caen. He has also taught tax policy and customs law at the University of Bangui. His Excellency is also a former student of the National Treasury School in Paris.

== Diplomatic career ==
Following a long career in the banking industry (mostly as a bank director), he entered diplomatic service, first as a close Adviser to Albert Mberio, Minister of Education of the Central African Republic, in charge of international relations and partnerships. He then became a special adviser to the Central African Republic President Ange-Félix Patassé.

After the accession to the power of President François Bozizé, he became Ambassador and Adviser to the Presidency. He was then appointed Ambassador Extraordinary and Plenipotentiary and delivered his credentials to the President of the Republic of Hungary, Ferenc MADL, on 25 May 2005.

Appointed by the Council of Ministers on the proposal of Marc Ati Minister of Foreign Affairs Special Envoy of the Republic of Vanuatu (ex New Hebrides), which is part of the Commonwealth, to the State of Israel and also Special Envoy to the Russian Federation with prerogatives and powers of Head of Mission.

Leclerc represented his Head of State at the funeral of Pope John Paul II.

He speaks English and French fluently and is a certified jet pilot.

== See also ==
- Foreign relations of Vanuatu
- Russia–Vanuatu relations
