= Sethy Regenvanu =

Vanuatuan politician

Sethy John Regenvanu (born 1945) is a politician in Vanuatu. He is one of several churchmen who have been active in Vanuatu politics, like Father Walter Lini, Rev. Frederick Karlomuana Timakata, and Father Gérard Leymang.

Hailing from Uripiv island near Malekula, he became lands minister in the last pre-independence government of the New Hebrides in November 1979.

He was Christian Education Officer with the Presbyterian Church of New Hebrides, before becoming Minister of Lands in the new government of Vanuatu on Independence in July 1980.

In February 1983 he succeeded Timakata as deputy prime minister. In January 1988 he became minister of education, youth and sports, and in December 1991 he again became deputy prime minister. He was Minister of Finance in 1991. Later he served as chairman of the electoral commission.

In 1994 he led a group which broke away from Lini's National United Party and formed the People's Democratic Party.

He has also been social issues coordinator in the Presbyterian Church of Vanuatu. In October 2004 he was seconded for a three-year appointment to St. Andrew's, Suva, Fiji.

He married an Australian-born missionary teacher, Dorothy Rutter, who also became a pastor in the Presbyterian Church. They have five sons, including Ralph Regenvanu, formerly the long-time director of the Vanuatu Cultural Centre and currently Minister for Lands in the government of Moana Carcasses.

He has written an autobiography, Laef Blong Mi (2004).
