= Russia–Vanuatu relations =

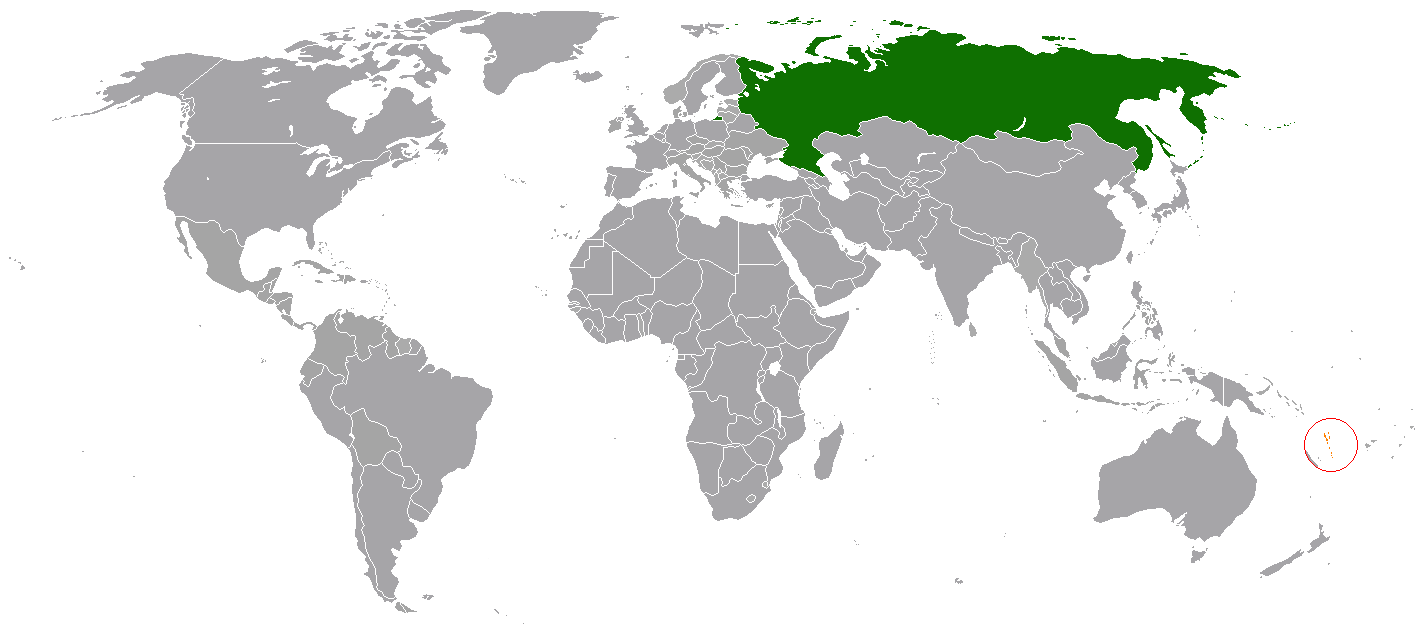

- Russia: Vanuatu

The Republic of Vanuatu and the Union of Soviet Socialist Republics established official diplomatic relations on June 30, 1986 – three months to the day before Vanuatu established diplomatic relations with the United States. With the dissolution of the Soviet Union in 1991, the Russian Federation emerged as its successor state in 1991.

In December 2011, Vanuatu appointed Thitam Goiset, president of the Nagriamel and John Frum movements and sister of businessman Dinh Van Than, as ambassador to Russia.

== History ==
Vanuatu, which became independent from France and the United Kingdom in 1980, was led by Prime Minister Father Walter Lini, founder of the doctrine of Melanesian socialism, from 1980 to 1991. Lini's foreign policy was one of non-alignment, manifested by Vanuatu joining the Non-Aligned Movement in 1983. His government was the only one in Oceania at the time which refused to align with the Western bloc during the dying stages of the Cold War. Lini sought to maintain cordial, though not particularly close, relations with the Soviet Union.

In 2011, however, Vanuatu (under Prime Minister Sato Kilman) did follow Russia's lead in recognising the breakaway Georgian province of Abkhazia as a sovereign state. Foreign Affairs Minister Alfred Carlot "offered little explanation for the decision [but] did give hints. He said he had studied at Moscow’s diplomatic academy during Soviet days, and that Vanuatu’s foreign policy aims at “eradicating colonialism from the face of the earth.”"

In 2022, Vanuatu voted in favor of a UN General Assembly resolution to condemn Russia's invasion of Ukraine, and demand that Russia immediately withdraw all troops.
