= France–Vanuatu relations =

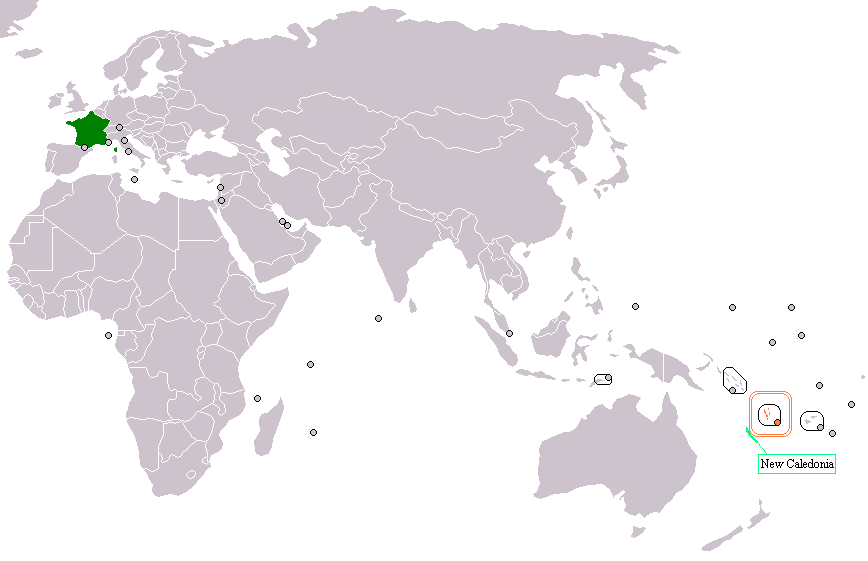

- France: Vanuatu

The French Republic and the Republic of Vanuatu have long-standing bilateral relations which have varied over the years between tense and amicable. Vanuatu, then known as the New Hebrides, was a Franco-British condominium from 1906 to 1980, and maintained formal relations with both of its former colonial masters after gaining independence. Franco–Vanuatuan relations were rocked by a series of crises in the 1980s, and broke down completely on several occasions, with Vanuatu expelling the French ambassador in 1981, in 1984 and in 1987. Relations improved from the 1990s onwards and, today, France provides development aid to Vanuatu. The two countries also share amicable economic and cultural relations; both are members of the Organisation internationale de la Francophonie.

== Prior to the 1980s ==
Vanuatu is a product of colonisation and decolonisation; it did not exist as a unified sovereign entity prior to the establishment of the Condominium in 1906, and its accession to independence in 1980. For France's role during the colonial period, see the article on the New Hebrides.

== 1980s and 1990s ==
From 1980 to 1991, Vanuatu was governed by Prime Minister Father Walter Lini, the "father of independence", who established a resolutely independent foreign policy, brought his country into the Non-Aligned Movement in 1983, promoted the concept of Melanesian socialism and refused alignment with the Western bloc during the late stages of the Cold War. France's reluctance to grant the country independence in the late 1970s - contrasted with the United Kingdom's wish to speedily cut colonial ties - signified a potential legacy of tension, particularly since France had been accused of encouraging a separatist movement on Espiritu Santo just prior to independence. In addition, ni-Vanuatu politics remained polarised along linguistic lines, with francophones (who in general were also francophiles) constituting a minority in opposition against Lini's anglophone majority.

=== The Neo-Caledonian issue ===
One of Lini's first foreign policy moves upon attaining office was to provide open encouragement for the Kanak and Socialist National Liberation Front (FLNKS), the pro-independence movement in neighbouring New Caledonia, which remained a French territory. Lini described indigenous New Caledonians as ni-Vanuatu's "Melanesian brothers", and stated, on the basis of Melanesian solidarity, that they alone should determine the political future of New Caledonia.

In February 1981, Barak Sopé, secretary-general of Vanuatu's ruling Vanua'aku Pati, accepted an invitation to speak at the annual congress of the FLNKS. He obtained a visa to New Caledonia from the French embassy in Port-Vila, which was subsequently revoked by French authorities, who declared that a man in Sopé's position speaking at a pro-independence congress in a French territory would constitute unacceptable interference in internal French affairs. Sopé was briefly detained at the airport in Nouméa. Vanuatu reacted by declaring the French ambassador to Vanuatu persona non grata. France reacted in turn by reducing the aid it provided to Vanuatu. Relations were normalised in October. In 1984, the French ambassador was again expelled after protesting against Vanuatu's continued support for the FLNKS.

In 1986, Vanuatu campaigned for New Caledonia to be re-inscribed on the United Nations list of non-self-governing territories. France responded with economic sanctions.

In 1987, Vanuatu opposed a referendum held in New Caledonia on the island group's political status, and delivered a petition to the French embassy in protest.

=== The nuclear issue ===
In the 1980s, Vanuatu continuously condemned France's nuclear tests in French Polynesia. In 1985, the Rainbow Warrior was greeted and fêted by Lini's government in Port-Vila as part of Vanuatu's hosting of a Nuclear Free and Independent Pacific Conference in Port-Vila. Ni-Vanuatu official Charles Rara remained aboard to witness the vessel's protest trip to Mururoa, and shared a cabin with Fernando Pereira. Following the sinking of the Rainbow Warrior in Auckland on 10 July that same year, Lini openly accused France of having committed a "terrorist act".

=== The Matthew and Hunter Islands ===
The Matthew and Hunter Islands were the cause of a maritime boundary dispute between Vanuatu and France (New Caledonia). They had been part of the New Hebrides until 1976, when France and Britain agreed to include them on New Caledonia maps instead of New Hebrides maps as had been in the case since the commencement of the 1906 Condominium of the New Hebrides. Lini's government rejected French sovereignty over the islands, and, in 1983, a Vanuatu Government-sanctioned mission led by Captain Leith Nasak on MV Euphrosyne II travelled to Hunter Island with traditional leaders from Southern Vanuatu to plant the ni-Vanuatu flag. The French patrol vessel, the Dunkerquoise prevented the Vanuatu mission from reaching Matthew Island.

The dispute also spills over to Fiji when, in 1982, Fiji and France signed an agreement on mutual recognition of their maritime boundaries, in which Fiji recognised French ownership of the Matthew and Hunter Islands. Vanuatu demanded that Fiji recognise ni-Vanuatu sovereignty over the islands, stating that failure to do so would "constitute a grave blow on peace, solidarity and stability in the region". Fiji did not revoke its signing of the agreement. Archival research has since revealed that France's claim of having legally annexed the disputed islands in 1929 are unsubstantiated .

=== Compensation claim ===
In 1981, Vanuatu requested that the United Kingdom and France pay compensation for damages caused by the secessionist movement on Espiritu Santo the previous year. France and Britain both delayed their responses, provoking diplomatic tensions when Vanuatu became increasingly insistent on the issue.

=== Accusations of French political interference ===
In 1987, the ni-Vanuatu government accused France of having funded the electoral campaign of the francophone Opposition Union of Moderate Parties, in the lead-up to the 1987 general election. No proof was provided, and France denied any truth to the accusation, but Lini expelled the French ambassador for the third time. France reacted by cutting its aid from Vt 177,000,000 to Vt 1,900,000. Vanuatu responded in turn by expelling the remaining French diplomats in the country.

=== 1988: ni-Vanuatu moves for normalisation ===
In 1988, ni-Vanuatu President Ati George Sokomanu called upon the government to seek a normalisation of its relations with France, describing France as a "friend" of Vanuatu. Lini made a first move by cancelling the visa requirement for French nationals visiting Vanuatu. Lini subsequently wrote to French President François Mitterrand and Prime Minister Michel Rocard, congratulating them on a recent electoral victory and expressing his wish for an improvement in bilateral relations. Lini underlined the fact that the interruption of French aid had had a dire impact on the education and health sectors, and that a resumption of French aid was urgently needed.

Little was achieved in the short run, particularly when, that same year, Lini criticised the Matignon Accords in New Caledonia. Later, however, Lini declared publicly that his government would no longer speak on New Caledonian issues, and, in October, Foreign Affairs Minister Donald Kalpokas, addressing the United Nations General Assembly, unexpectedly praised "the wisdom, sensibility and courage of the current French government" in engaging in productive dialogue in New Caledonia. In June 1989, however, Radio Vanuatu, a State-owned radio, incorrectly accused French gendarmes of having murdered Jean-Marie Tjibaou and Yéwéné Yéwéné, an incident which prompted France to cut all aid to Vanuatu. During a visit to Suva in September, Rocard ignored Vanuatu altogether.

Later, however, Rocard met with Kalpokas to discuss a resumption of relations (and aid). Rocard demanded a written statement from Lini, describing the latter's position regarding France. Lini complied, and wrote that he was in agreement with France's policy in New Caledonia. In November 1989, Kalpokas became the first ever ni-Vanuatu Foreign Affairs Minister to pay a State visit to France. He re-iterated Vanuatu's support for the Matignon Accords, and soothed French concern over alleged discrimination against francophone ni-Vanuatu. Relations slowly began to improve.

In 1991, French academic Elise Huffer wrote that Lini had, "it seems, deliberately sought to provoke France so as to make it look responsible for all the archipelago's problems, and so as to justify a policy of submission (if not repression) of the indigenous francophone population".

Elections in 1991 saw Lini voted out of office, and the francophone, pro-French Union of Moderate Parties come to power, led by a new Prime Minister, Maxime Carlot Korman. The change in the ni-Vanuatu government heralded a normalisation of relations between Paris and Port-Vila.

=== 1991: first francophone government ===
Maxime Carlot Korman was the first francophone Prime Minister of Vanuatu. He "reversed [the country's] unequivocal support for the Kanak National Liberation Front in New Caledonia [and] its systematic enmity towards France". Francophones held power until 1998.

== 2000s ==
In March 2008, the French Ministry of Foreign Affairs stated that Franco–ni-Vanuatu relations had "never been so good" as at present. At that time, France was Vanuatu's second largest aid provider, behind Australia.

== See also ==
- Lycée Français J. M. G. Le Clézio
