= Heather Lin̄i-Leo Matas =

Ni-Vanuatu lawyer

Heather Lin̄i-Leo Matas (died 2016) was a lawyer from Vanuatu. She was the country's first indigenous female lawyer.

Lin̄i-Leo was born and raised on Pentecost Island, the eighth of ten children and sister to Walter Lin̄i, the future first Prime Minister of Vanuatu. She attended primary school at Nazareth on North Pentecost and high school at the British Secondary School (present-day Malapoa College). Lin̄i-Leo studied law at the University of Papua New Guinea, at the Victorian Bar Association in Australia and in the United Kingdom.

Lin̄i-Leo was principal legal officer at the National Provident Fund in Vanuatu. She also served in the State Law Office as Legal Counsel to the Attorney General, in the Public Solicitor's Office, the Ombudsman Office and as Public Prosecutor.

== See also ==
- List of first women lawyers and judges in Oceania
