= Cuba–Oceania relations =

- Cuba: Oceania

Cuban-Pacific relations are diplomatic, economic, cultural, and other relations between the Cuba and countries situated in Oceania. In the 2000s, Cuba has been strengthening its relations with Pacific nations, which have, for the most part, responded favorably to Cuban medical aid in particular. The first Cuba-Pacific Islands ministerial meeting was held in September 2008 in Havana, with government members from ten Pacific countries—Kiribati, Tuvalu, Nauru, Solomon Islands, Fiji, Tonga, Vanuatu, Samoa, the Federated States of Micronesia and Papua New Guinea—attending. The meeting was a consolidation rather than a starting point of Cuban-Pacific relations.

== Formal diplomatic relations ==
Cuba has only one embassy in Oceania, located in Wellington (opened in November 2007). It also has a Consulate General in Sydney. However, Cuba has official diplomatic relations with Vanuatu since 1983, with Nauru since 2002, the Solomon Islands since 2003, and the Federated States of Micronesia since 2019 and maintains relations with other Pacific countries by providing aid. Cuba established formal diplomatic relations with Fiji, Samoa and Tonga in February and March 2009.

Despite there being a Cuban embassy in Wellington, there is no New Zealand embassy in Havana; the New Zealand embassy in Mexico City is accredited to Cuba. In April 2011, however, the Solomon Islands announced they would be opening an embassy in Cuba – making them the first Pacific country to do so.

== September 2008 ministerial meeting ==
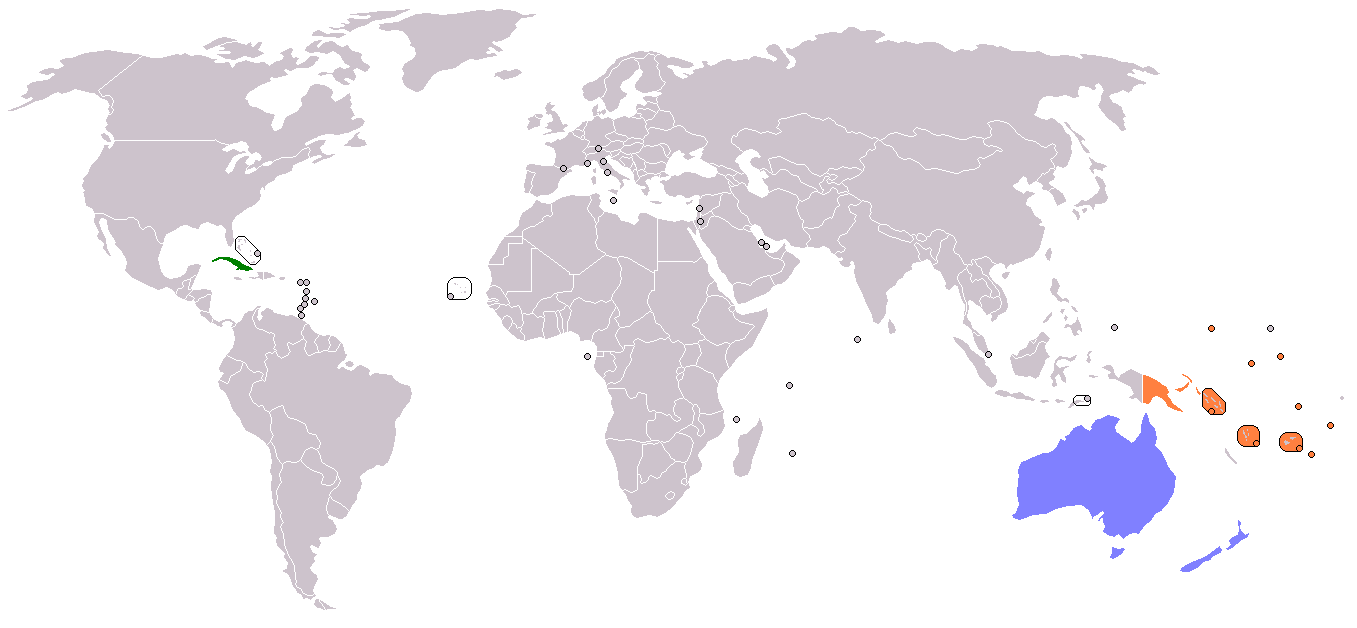
The Republic of Cuba (green), the ten Pacific countries which attended the September 2008 ministerial meeting (orange), and the two Pacific countries in which Cuba has diplomatic representation, but which did not attend the meeting (mauve).

The first of its kind, it brought together government representatives of Cuba, Papua New Guinea and nine Pacific Island countries. Cuban Foreign Minister Felipe Perez Roque stated that Cuba hoped to assist Small Island Developing States in facing the effects of climate change, an issue of particular concern for Pacific nations. Attendees were also due to discuss "strengthening co-operation in health, sports and education".

Among officials in attendance were I-Kiribati President Anote Tong, along with I-Kiribati health minister Dr. Kautu Tenanaua, and Tuvaluan Prime Minister Apisai Ielemia. Fiji was represented by foreign minister Ratu Epeli Nailatikau, and the Solomon Islands by foreign minister William Haomae. President Tong, by meeting President Raúl Castro to discuss "mutual friendship and cooperation", became the first Pacific leader to pay a state visit to Cuba.

Following the meeting, it was reported that Cuba and the Pacific countries involved had "strengthened their cooperation".

== Tarawa Conference in November 2010 ==
Cuba was one of fifteen countries to attend the Tarawa Climate Change Conference in Kiribati in November 2010, and one of twelve to sign the Ambo Declaration on climate change issued from the conference.

== Cuban medical aid ==
Cuba's medical aid to Pacific countries has been two-pronged, consisting of sending doctors to Oceania, and providing scholarships for Pacific students to study medicine in Cuba at Cuba's expense.

An initial contingent of 15 Cuban health workers reached Kiribati in 2006, while Cuba also offered scholarships and training to I-Kiribati doctors. As I-Kiribati students and doctors graduated, they gradually replaced the Cuban health workers, and as of 2021 only one Cuban doctor remained in Kiribati. Cuban doctors have reportedly provided a dramatic improvement to the field of medical care in Kiribati, reducing the child mortality rate in that country by 80%, and winning the proverbial hearts and minds in the Pacific. In response, the Solomon Islands began recruiting Cuban doctors in July 2007, while Papua New Guinea and Fiji considered following suit.

Between 2006 and 2008, Cuba also sent doctors to the Solomon Islands, Vanuatu, Tuvalu, Nauru and Papua New Guinea, while again offering scholarships and placements for medical students from the Pacific to study in Cuba. It was reported that it might also provide training for Fiji doctors.

As of September 2008, fifteen Cuban doctors were serving in Kiribati, sixty-four Pacific students were studying medicine in Cuba, and Cuban authorities were offering "up to 400 scholarships to young people of that region". Among those sixty-four students were twenty-five Solomon Islanders, twenty I-Kiribati, two Nauruans and seventeen ni-Vanuatu. Pacific Islanders have been studying in Cuba since 2006.

In June 2009, Prensa Latina reported that Cuban doctors had "inaugurated a series of new health services in Tuvalu". One Cuban doctor had been serving in Tuvalu since October 2008, and two more since February 2009. They had reportedly "attended 3,496 patients, and saved 53 lives", having "opened ultrasound and abortion services, as well as specialized consultations on hypertension, diabetes, and chronic diseases in children". They had visited all the country's islands, and were training local staff in "primary health care, and how to deal with seriously ill patients, among other subjects".

In July 2011, the Australian government sent Parliamentary Secretary for Pacific Island Affairs Richard Marles to Cuba to discuss "ways in which [Australia] can cooperate with Cuba and its work in the Pacific, particularly in relation to health".

== Particular bilateral relations ==
=== Australia ===
Cuba and Australia signed an agreement in 2019 to foster cooperation in developing ties in baseball and Baseball5.

=== Federated States of Micronesia ===
In 2019 Cuba sent its first accredited, though non-residential, ambassador to the Federated States of Micronesia.

=== Fiji ===
Fiji's ambassador to the United Nations, Berenado Vunibobo, stated in 2008 that his country could seek closer relations with Cuba, and in particular medical assistance, following a decline in Fiji's relations with New Zealand.

In 2010, Vunibobo's successor, Peter Thomson, visited Cuba, where he discussed "areas of co-operation in the medical field" with the Cuban authorities. This visit came as of Fiji's attempt to broaden its diplomatic relations, following a fall-out with Australia and New Zealand in the wake of the 2006 military coup.

In September 2010, for the first time, Fiji sent four students to study medicine at the Latin American School of Medicine in Cuba, with a seven-year scholarship provided by the Cuban government. Cuba also provided four more scholarships to Fiji for the following year.

=== Kiribati ===
Cuba's relations with Kiribati are shaped primarily by the former's medical assistance to the latter.

In December 2010, Kiribati President and Foreign Minister Anote Tong carried out his second State visit to Cuba, to hold official talks with Cuban President Raul Castro.

=== Nauru ===
In June 2007, Nauru adopted the "Cuban literacy method", reportedly used also in several other countries. In October 2007, Nauruan Foreign Minister and Trade Minister David Adeang travelled to Cuba to strengthen relations between the two island nations. This led to the creation of a Cuba-Nauru Joint Intergovernmental Commission for Economic Cooperation. An unspecified number of Cuban doctors are serving in Nauru.

In December 2010, President Marcus Stephen of Nauru paid his first State visit to Cuba, meeting President Raul Castro to "review the state of bilateral relations and to strengthen them". Stephen also "referred to the threat of global warming to his country" during the talks.

=== New Zealand ===
Regarding relations with New Zealand, Cuban ambassador Jose Luis Robaina Garcia said his country had "admiration for New Zealand's independent foreign policy".

=== Solomon Islands ===
In April 2007, the Solomon Star reported that the Solomon Islands' High Commissioner to the United Nations was soon to be sworn in as Ambassador to Cuba. In September 2007, it was announced that 40 Cuban doctors would be sent to the Solomon Islands. The Solomons’ Minister of Foreign Affairs Patterson Oti said that Solomon Islander doctors would "learn from their Cuban colleagues in specialized areas". In addition to providing doctors, Cuba provided scholarships for 50 Solomon Islanders to study medicine in Cuba for free. According to a spokesman for the Solomon Islands Ministry of Health, the Solomons are "desperately in need" of doctors, and hence grateful to Cuba for its "much needed assistance".

In April 2011, the Solomon Islands announced they would be opening an embassy in Havana. By September, a budget had been allocated for the setting up of the embassy, and it was announced that a government delegation would soon be visiting Cuba. In March 2013, Solomon Islands Ambassador Simeon Bouro became the first resident ambassador for any Pacific Island country in Cuba.

=== Tonga ===
Cuba's first ambassador accredited to Tonga, Jose Luis Robaina (based in New Zealand), presented his credentials to King George Tupou V in March 2009. The King had previously visited Cuba. Ambassador Robaina and King George were reported to have discussed "strengthen[ing] bilateral cooperation, especially in health, education, sports, agriculture and human resource training". Xinhua reported that the King had praised Cuba's "social breakthroughs, the quality of its ballet and culture in general and its impressive achievements in public health".

Tonga's initial ambassador accredited to Cuba was its Permanent Representative to the United Nations, Fekitamoeloa 'Utoikamanu, until April 2009, when Sonatane Tu'a Taumoepeau Tupou succeeded her to the position.

=== Tuvalu ===
Cuba assists Tuvalu in a variety of ways, but its principal aid is provided in the form of health services.

=== Vanuatu ===
Cuba's relations with Vanuatu are older than with any other Pacific Island country. The two nations established formal diplomatic relations in 1983, at a time when ni-Vanuatu Prime Minister Walter Lini was constructing his country's resolutely non-aligned foreign policy. Dormant in the 1990s, relations were revived in the 2000s with Cuba's new regional policies in the Pacific.
