= Lycée Français J. M. G. Le Clézio =

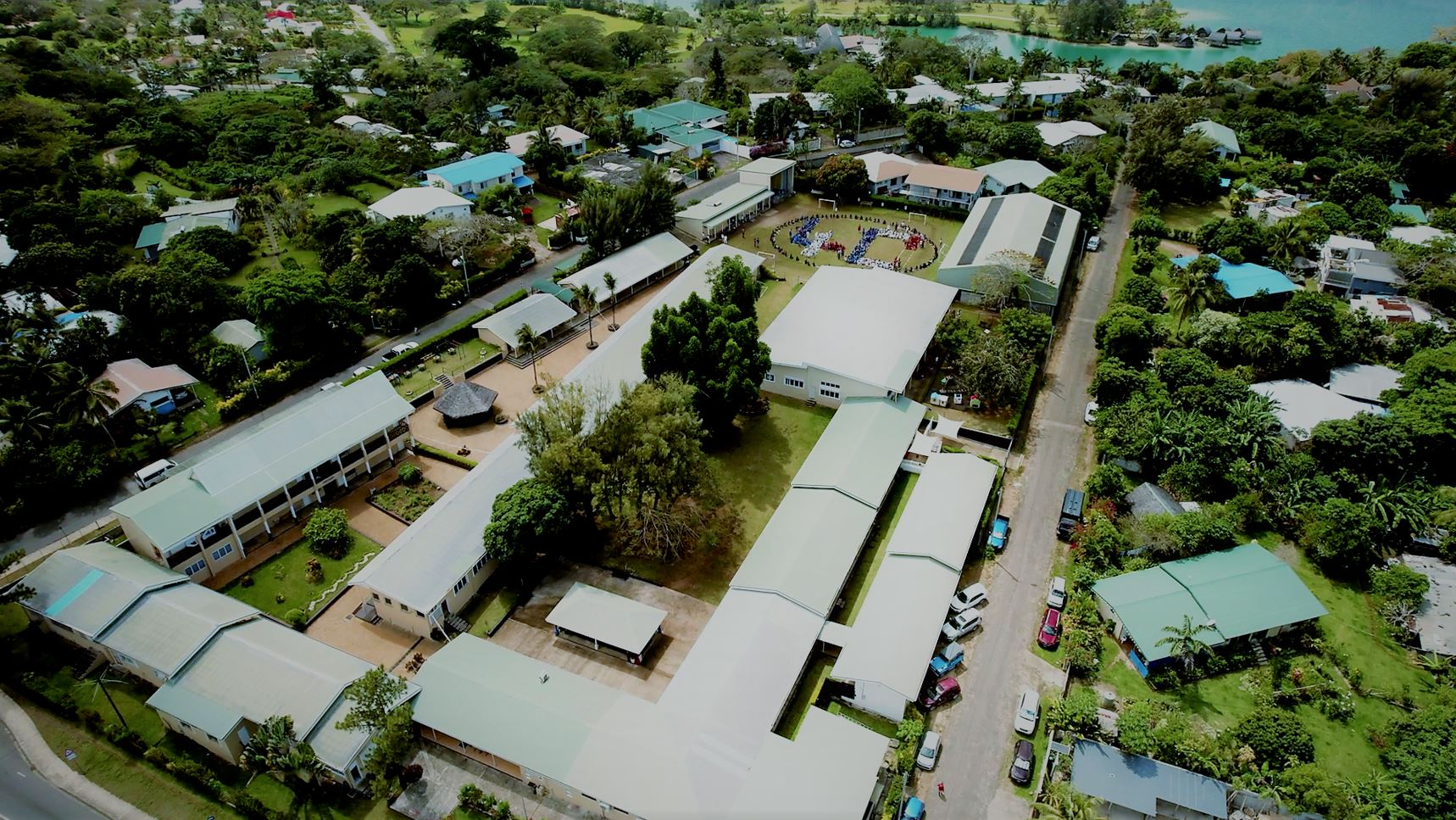
- Port Vila French High School

Location
- Colardeau Avenue; Port-Vila; Vanuatu

Information
- Type: School (AEFE affiliated)
- Established: 1981
- President: Laurence MAINGUY
- Director: Vincent BARAUD
- Headmaster: Françis BAQUIE

Lycée Français Jean-Marie Gustave Le Clézio or Port Vila French Lycée (Lycée français de Port-Vila) is a French international school in Port-Vila, Vanuatu.

== Description ==
It was named after French author J. M. G. Le Clézio. It serves maternelle (preschool) through terminale, the final year of lycée (sixth form/senior high school).

The Lycée de Port Vila was established in 1981. In 1987 one sixth (sixth to last) class and fifth (fifth to last) class opened. Additional grade levels were added until 1992, when the first graduates received their baccalauréat degrees.

It is the most eastern school in the AEFE network, and the only French high school abroad in the entire Pacific Island.

== Curriculum ==
The school offers the full length of French curriculum, from maternelle to baccalauréat. Foreign languages include English, Spanish and Mandarin Chinese.

== See also ==
- France–Vanuatu relations
