= Indonesia–Vanuatu relations =

Bilateral relations

- Indonesia: Vanuatu

Indonesia–Vanuatu relations are the bilateral relations between Indonesia and Vanuatu. Relations have been historically strained due to Vanuatu's support for the Free Papua Movement. Both nations are members of the Non-Aligned Movement, World Trade Organization, and the Melanesian Spearhead Group (MSG) where Indonesia is labeled as an observer state.

== History ==
The two nations established diplomatic relations on 3 July 1995 when Vanuatu's Prime Minister Maxime Korman visited Indonesia and signed a Joint Communiqué with Indonesian President Soeharto. This marked the start of cooperation, including discussions on Vanuatu's support for Indonesia's foreign policy regarding East Timor.

In 2018, Indonesia accused Vanuatu of undermining ties and backing separatist movements after Vanuatu supported West Papuan self-determination at the United Nations. Indonesian representative Aloysius Selwas Taborat criticized Vanuatu's stance as a disguise for promoting separatism, referencing a 1969 UN resolution on West Papua. Vanuatu's Prime Minister Charlot Salwai called for human rights investigations in West Papua, where abuses are frequently reported. Indonesian Vice President Jusuf Kalla condemned these actions as hostile and a violation of UN principles, affirming Indonesia's commitment to defend its territorial integrity.

On 16 June 2023, Vanuatu's Foreign Minister Jotham Napat met with Indonesian Foreign Minister Retno Marsudi, marking the first visit by a senior Vanuatu official to Jakarta in over a decade. During the meeting, Vanuatu announced plans to establish an embassy in Jakarta and initiate annual bilateral meetings, aiming to enhance cooperation in trade and development. Both ministers acknowledged shared challenges like climate change and natural disasters, emphasizing the "Pacific Elevation" initiative launched by Indonesia to strengthen ties with Pacific nations. Despite historical tensions regarding human rights in Papua, analysts suggest that enhanced relations may be a countermeasure to China's influence in the Pacific, with Vanuatu balancing its human rights advocacy and diplomatic engagements as a means for mutual growth.

On 19 June 2023, Indonesian Vice President Ma'ruf Amin met with Foreign Minister Napat at the Vice Presidential Palace. They discussed strengthening bilateral relations, focusing on development and economics, and Indonesia's role as a gateway for Vanuatu to the ASEAN market. Amin emphasized sustainable development efforts in Papua and the formation of a steering committee for long-term goals. Nauka expressed Vanuatu's desire to enhance cooperation, including sister city relationships with the Papua Province, with officials from both nations present to explore collaborative initiatives.

On 19 October 2024, Vanuatu's Prime Minister Charlot Salwai visited Indonesia on the occasion of the Inauguration of Indonesian President Prabowo Subianto. He also met with President Prabowo to discuss collaborative projects aimed at enhancing bilateral relations. Key areas of focus include maritime cooperation, infrastructure, and the shipping industry. Indonesian Ambassador to Australia and Vanuatu, Siswo Pramono, noted that initial groundwork has been established, with the Indonesian Embassy in Canberra initiating discussions with relevant ministries.

== Cooperation ==
In 2024, Indonesia allocated about 6 billion rupiah for disaster waste management in Vanuatu and 1.2 billion rupiah to enhance the capacity of healthcare workers in their nursing sector.

On 23 June 2025, Indonesian Deputy Foreign Minister Arrmanatha Nasir highlighted Indonesia’s dedication to enhancing bilateral cooperation with Pacific nations for mutual prosperity and solidarity in addressing global challenges, during discussions with Vanuatu's Foreign Minister Marc Ati.

== Foreign Aid ==
In April 2015, the Indonesian government provided $2 million in aid to Vanuatu following a cyclone resulting in 11 fatalities and thousands left homeless. The aid includes $450 thousand in cash, nutritional supplements, ready-to-eat food, baby and pregnancy food, clothing, blankets, solar cells, and family tents.

In May 2023, after Cyclones Judy and Kevin and a magnitude 6.5 earthquake affected Vanuatu, Indonesia sent Rp17.6 billion in post-disaster recovery assistance through the National Disaster Mitigation Agency, including logistics and equipment and Rp10 billion for repairs to the Port Vila airport VVIP room.

On 27 December 2024, the Indonesian government sent 50.5 tons of humanitarian aid to Vanuatu following a 7.3 magnitude earthquake on 17 December that resulted in 12 deaths and extensive injuries. The aid package includes an Emergency Medical Team, medical supplies, hygiene kits, food for vulnerable groups, water purifiers, and a medical service tent.

== Trade ==
In 2024, Indonesia's exports to Vanuatu reached $12.5 million, primarily consisting of Passenger and Cargo Ships ($2.5 million), Iron Structures ($2.3 million), and Palm Oil ($1.76 million). This represents a 24.2% annual growth from $4.24 million in 2019. Conversely, Vanuatu exported $1.55 million to Indonesia, mainly Cocoa Beans ($1.55 million), with exports increasing at an annual rate of 18.2% from $672 thousand in 2019.

In February 2026, the Vanuatu Chamber of Commerce and Industry (VCCI) signed a Memorandum of Understanding with the Indonesian Chamber of Commerce and Industry, solidifying their collaboration. This agreement, initially initialed on 14 October 2025, marked a significant step in enhancing trade and investment opportunities between Indonesia and Vanuatu. Key areas for cooperation include fisheries, cocoa, beef, and coffee exports, with plans for an Indonesian business mission to Vanuatu in May 2026. The MoU establishes a three-year framework for ongoing private sector collaboration.

== Resident diplomatic missions ==
- Indonesia is represented in Vanuatu through its embassy in Canberra, Australia. However, Vanuatu suggested that an Indonesian embassy in Port Vila should be kept apart from the one in Canberra.
- In 2015 and 2023, Vanuatu announced plans to open an embassy in Jakarta.

== See also ==
- Foreign relations of Indonesia
- Foreign relations of Vanuatu
