= Islands Business =

Pacific Islands media company

Islands Business is a "multimedia publishing company" established in the 1970s in Suva, Fiji.

ABC Radio describes it as an "influential regional publication".

With correspondents throughout Oceania, it describes itself as the "premier publishing group in the Pacific Islands region", with fourteen outlets in digital and video media as well as printed magazines. The latter include current affairs and business magazines, in-flight magazines for three of the region's airlines, including Cathay Pacific, and four special-interest industry publications. These are "distributed throughout the Pacific islands as also in Australia, New Zealand, US, UK, Southeast Asia and Japan".
