= Melanesian socialism =

Form of socialism in Melanesia from the 1980s

The concept of Melanesian socialism was first advocated by Walter Lin̄i of the New Hebrides (now Vanuatu), who became the country's first Prime Minister upon its independence from France and the United Kingdom in 1980. Lin̄i's views on socialism were inspired by Julius Nyerere's experiments in African socialism in Tanzania.

Lin̄i believed that socialism was inherently compatible with Melanesian societies and customs, including the emphasis on communal welfare over individualism and the communal ownership and working of land. In this, Nyerere's influence is perceptible as the latter stressed the similarities between socialism and traditional African ways of life.

Lin̄i was an Anglican priest and believed that socialism held close similarities with Christian values and sought to combine the two as part of a Melanesian way. In this sense, socialism was not to be revolutionary, but instead fully in line with ni-Vanuatu tradition.

Although he admired Nyerere and his government sought rapprochement with countries such as Cuba and Libya, Lin̄i believed that socialism should not necessarily entail an alliance with the Soviet Union or the Eastern bloc. Indeed, he preferred for Vanuatu to remain non-aligned and to develop closer ties with its fellow Melanesian nations (such as Papua New Guinea and the Solomon Islands). In 1982, he expressed hopes for an eventual Melanesian federal union and spoke of the "renaissance of Melanesian values", including "Melanesian socialism".

In New Caledonia, the Kanak and Socialist National Liberation Front (FLNKS), an alliance of pro-independence parties, advocates the implementation of socialism along with accession to sovereignty. Independent Melanesian nations (most notably Vanuatu) have expressed support for the FLNKS.

== See also ==
- African socialism
- Arab socialism
- Third World socialism

== Bibliography ==
- Huffer, Elise (1993). Grands Hommes et Petites Îles: La Politique Extérieure de Fidji, de Tonga et du Vanuatu. Paris: Orstom. ISBN 2-7099-1125-6.
- Denoon, Donald et al. (ed.) (1997). The Cambridge History of the Pacific Islanders. Cambridge: Cambridge University Press. ISBN 0-521-00354-7.
- Linnekin, Jocelyn (1990). "The Politics of Culture in the Pacific". In Linneki, Jocelyn; Poyer, Lin (ed.). Cultural Identity and Ethnicity in the Pacific. Honolulu: University of Hawaii Press. ISBN 0-8248-1891-1.
