= Walter Lini =

Prime Minister of Vanuatu from 1980 to 1991

The Honourable Reverend Walter Lin̄i

1st Prime Minister of Vanuatu
- In office 30 July 1980 – 6 September 1991
- President: Ati George Sokomanu; Onneyn Tahi (acting); Frederick Karlomuana Timakata
- Preceded by: Position established
- Succeeded by: Donald Kalpokas

Personal details
- Born: 1941 Agatoa village, Pentecost Island, New Hebrides
- Died: 21 February 1999 (aged 57–58) Port Vila, Vanuatu
- Party: New Hebrides National Party (1970–1974); Vanua'aku Pati (1974–1991); National United Party (1991–1999)
- Spouse: Mary Lini
- Relations: Ham Lin̄i (brother); Heather Lin̄i-Leo Matas (sister); Motarilavoa Hilda Lin̄i (sister)
- Children: 6

Walter Hadye Lin̄i (/heɪ.ˈdɪ li.ni/ he-di li-ni Bislama pronunciation: [haedi liŋi]; 1941 – 21 February 1999) was a Raga Anglican priest and politician who was the first Prime Minister of Vanuatu, from independence in 1980 to 1991. He was born at Agatoa village, Pentecost Island.

Lin̄i was a key figure in Vanuatu's struggle for independence. He was a key proponent of Melanesian socialism.

== Early life ==
Lin̄i started school at the age of five when he attended the Australian Missionary Sunday School at Lamalanga on North Pentecost. In 1949, he began attending Nazareth School at Agatoa. From there, he attended Vureas School on Aoba. After finishing school, Lin̄i worked in the Anglican Diocesan office at Lolowai, before undertaking theological training at St Peter's College in Siota, Solomon Islands and St John's College, Auckland.

While a deacon in the Solomon Islands, Lin̄i would go on to help create the precursor to the modern-day football club Real Kakamora, now considered to be one of the most popular clubs in Oceania. He also founded a newspaper, The Kakamora Reporter.

After returning home, Lin̄i, along with Donald Kalpokas and John Bani, formed the New Hebrides Cultural Association and launched its mouthpiece newspaper, New Hebrides Viewpoint. At that time, New Hebrides was a condominium ruled by the United Kingdom and France. Soon after the formation of the New Hebrides Cultural Association, Lin̄i and others formed the New Hebrides National Party (NHNP), with Lin̄i responsible for publishing the newspaper as well as recruiting party members on Aoba, North Pentecost and Maewo. In 1974, the Party Congress elected Lin̄i as full-time national president of the party, with Fred Timakata vice-president. In May, 1974, Lin̄i addressed the United Nations Committee of 24 on decolonisation, and called for independence for the New Hebrides by 1977.

== Political career ==
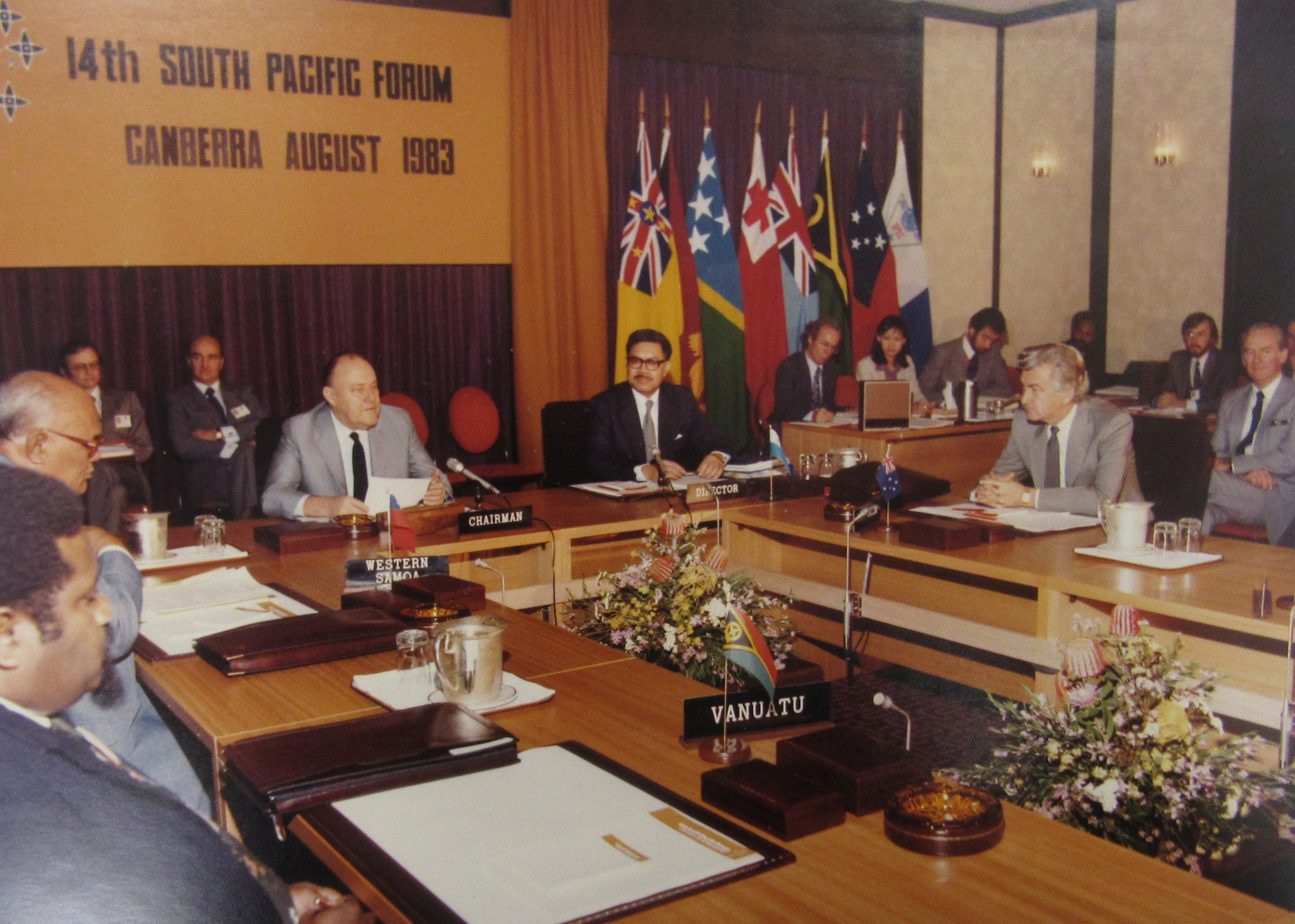
Lin̄i (bottom left) attending a meeting of the South Pacific Forum, 1983

Lin̄i was instrumental in the NHNP changing its name to the Vanua'aku Pati (VP). In November 1977 he was chosen as president of the Vanuaaku People's Provisional Government, established after the VP boycotted the 1977 elections. The provisional government was suspended in May 1978 and Lin̄i subsequently joined the government of national unity in December 1978 as minister for social affairs.

Lin̄i was elected Chief Minister following the VP's victory in the 1979 New Hebridean general election, and ascended to the position of Prime Minister upon Vanuatu's independence on July 30, 1980.

Lin̄i went on to lead the VP to victory in the 1983 and the 1987 general elections.

Lini suffered a stroke in 1987 but subsequently remained active in politics.

Lin̄i's administration was very controversial in the West because of its ties with the Eastern Bloc, Libya, and other socialist countries viewed with disdain by the United States and Europe, and its staunch opposition to nuclear testing in the region. He was the primary advocate of Melanesian socialism. Lini was a critic of Western market economies, arguing that they caused poverty in the Third World. Vanuatu was a part of the non-aligned movement. Vanuatu provided support to the Kanak indigenous independence movement in New Caledonia and was the only country in the region to support the independence of East Timor, then under Indonesian occupation, to self-determination.

In 1988, President Ati George Sokomanu sought unsuccessfully to remove Lini from office. In 1990, Lini was awarded the New Zealand 1990 Commemoration Medal.

His term ended in 1991, due to factionalism within his party. He joined the National United Party, of which he was leader at the time of his death.

He was later appointed deputy prime minister, minister of justice and minister of interior.

He died of an illness in Vanuatu's capital Port Vila.

== Personal life ==
His sister, Hilda Lin̄i, and brother, Ham Lin̄i, also served as politicians in Vanuatu. His sister Heather Lin̄i-Leo Matas was the first indigenous female lawyer in the country.

According to Lini, on his mother's side, he was a descendant of the high chief Virasangvulu, while on his father's side, he was descended from the famous weaver, Nuenue, as well as from the high chief Viralalau.
