= 2026 in Vanuatu =

- Decades: 2000s; 2010s; 2020s
- See also: Other events of 2026; Timeline of Vanuatuan history

The following lists events of the year 2026 in Vanuatu.

== Incumbents ==
- President: Nikenike Vurobaravu
- Prime Minister: Jotham Napat

== Events ==
- 29 March – A magnitude 7.3 earthquake hits Penama, injuring several people and causing extensive damage in Espiritu Santo.
- 29 June – Australia and Vanuatu sign the Nakamal Agreement in Canberra, strengthening cooperation on security, economic development, climate resilience, and infrastructure protection, with Australia remaining Vanuatu’s primary security and policing partner.
- 25 August – The Manaro Voui volcano in Ambae erupts.
- 11 September – The passenger ferry MV Matui sinks while sailing from between Espiritu Santo and Ambae, leaving one person dead and 30 others missing.

== Holidays ==
- 1 January – New Year's Day
- 21 February – Father Lini Day
- 5 March – Custom Chief's Day
- 3 April – Good Friday
- 4 April – Easter Saturday
- 6 April – Easter Monday
- 1 May – Labour Day
- 29 May – Ascension Day
- 24 July – Children's Day
- 30 July – Independence Day
- 15 August – Assumption Day
- 5 October – Constitution Day
- 29 November – National Unity Day
- 25 December – Christmas Day
- 26 December – Boxing Day
