= 2022 in Vanuatu =

- Decades: 2000s; 2010s; 2020s
- See also: Other events of 2022; Timeline of Vanuatuan history

Events from 2022 in Vanuatu.

== Incumbents ==
- President: Tallis Obed Moses (until 6 July), Seule Simeon (acting), Nikenike Vurobaravu (from 23 July)
- Prime Minister: Bob Loughman (until 4 November); Ishmael Kalsakau onwards

== Events ==
- Ongoing – COVID-19 pandemic in Oceania
- Early 2022 – 2022 Hunga Tonga–Hunga Ha'apai eruption and tsunami
- 18 August – An explosion destroyed a barge at Southwest Bay on the island of Malekula.
- 13 October – 2022 Vanuatuan general election: Vanuatuans vote for the members of their parliament in a snap election.
- 4 November – Ishmael Kalsakau is elected unopposed by secret ballot as the new prime minister, succeeding Bob Loughman.

== Elections ==
- 2022 Vanuatuan general election
- 2022 Vanuatuan presidential election

== Sports ==
- Vanuatu at the 2022 Commonwealth Games
- Vanuatu at the 2022 World Athletics Championships
