= 2021 in Vanuatu =

- Decades: 2000s; 2010s; 2020s
- See also: Other events of 2021; Timeline of Vanuatuan history

Events from 2021 in Vanuatu.

== Incumbents ==
- President: Tallis Obed Moses
- Prime Minister: Bob Loughman

== Events ==
- Ongoing – COVID-19 pandemic in Oceania; COVID-19 pandemic in Vanuatu
- January 29 – A Vanuatu patrol boat detains two Chinese fishing vessels near the Torres Islands in the Coral Sea for suspected illegal fishing.
- April 18 – Vanuatu halts outbound travel out of its main island of Efate following the confirmation of a COVID-19 case. Prime Minister Bob Loughman confirms that a Filipino fisherman whose body washed ashore last week near the capital of Port Vila had died of the disease.
- June 1 – The Vanuatuan opposition files a no-confidence motion against the government of Prime Minister Bob Loughman over allegations of excessive spending for self-interest in times of national crisis. The country's economy has been severely impacted due to the COVID-19 pandemic and the impact of Cyclone Harold last year. This motion is the first attempt to oust Loughman since he formed a government last year.
- June 8 – Gracia Shadrack, Vanuatu's speaker, declares that the seats of the prime minister Bob Loughman, the deputy prime minister, and 16 other MPs are vacant after they boycott parliament for three days.
- June 9 – Supreme Court of Vanuatu Justice Oliver Saksak places a stay on speaker Gracia Shadrack's vacation of 18 seats of parliament until a court can formally consider the dispute.
- June 29 – Prime Minister Bob Loughman wins a confidence vote by the parliament after a no-confidence motion had been introduced to remove his government by opposition leader Ralph Regenvanu. However, Loughman's hold on power remains tenuous as the Supreme Court ruled earlier this month that the seats of 19 government MPs were to be declared vacant. Loughman's government has already appealed the ruling.
- August 9 – Vanuatu's health authorities warn citizens about the transmission of dengue fever after 18 cases are reported in Port Vila. Authorities urge all residents to take precautionary measures.
- August 12 – Vanuatu stops the sale of its citizenship and revokes the citizenship it gave last April to a Syrian national for US$130,000.
- September 3 – The president of Vanuatu, Obed Moses Tallis, pardons former prime ministers Charlot Salwai, Joe Natuman and Serge Vohor, all of whom were convicted of political and financial crimes, including bribery and corruption.
- September 25 – Vanuatu launches a global campaign to seek an advisory opinion from the International Court of Justice (ICJ). Vanuatu bases its decision on being incapable with its own decisions to address rising sea levels and other challenges linked to climate change and wants the ICJ to establish responsibilities for climate change under international law.
- November 8 – Vanuatuan prime minister Bob Loughman confirms that two Vanuatuan citizens who were repatriated from New Caledonia have the Delta variant and urges residents to get vaccinated.

== Sports ==
- Vanuatu at the 2020 Summer Olympics
