= Estella Moses Tallis =

Vanuatuan public figure and activist

First Lady of Vanuatu
- In office 6 July 2017 – 6 July 2022
- President: Tallis Obed Moses
- Preceded by: ?
- Succeeded by: Rima Vurobaravu

Personal details
- Spouse: Tallis Obed Moses

Estella Moses Tallis is a Vanuatuan public figure, anti-plastic activist, and environmental advocate. She served as the First Lady of Vanuatu from 2017 until 2022 as the wife of President Tallis Obed Moses. During her tenure as first lady, Tallis campaigned against the use of plastic drinking straws and other single use plastics in Vanuatu to alleviate plastic pollution. Under Tallis' leadership, Vanuatu became the world's first country to ban the use of plastic straws on 1 July 2018. Disposable, single-use plastic bags and polystyrene take-out boxes were also banned by the same legislation supported by First Lady Moses Tallis and other anti-plastics activists. She became known as "Vanuatu's very own ‘Ban Plastic’ champion."

== Biography ==
Estella Moses Tallis became Vanuatu's first lady on 6 July 2017 following the election of her husband, President Tallis Obed Moses. She soon became noted for her campaign against single use plastics, especially disposable plastic drinking straws in Vanuatu. In February 2018, the government under Prime Minister Charlot Salwai, with the backing of the first lady and other supporters, became the first passed legislation to ban the use of plastic straws, plastic bags, and polystyrene takeaway food boxes. The ban went into effect on 1 July 2018, making Vanuatu the world's first country to ban the use of the plastic drinking straws.

On 15 May 2018, First Lady Tallis made a joint appearance with Minister of Tourism, Trade and Industries Alfred Maoh at the opening of a workshop to discuss the proposed ban of plastics and raise awareness of plastic pollution. Tallis spoke of her support of a ban on single use plastics, saying, "The ban on these plastics is an opportunity for us to help protect our planet and our island paradise of Vanuatu. It is also an opportunity for us in Vanuatu to strengthen our sustainable cultural practices." Tallis also advocated the replacement of plastics with traditional, sustainable, locally woven handicrafts and highlighted the role of Vanuatuan women in eliminating plastic pollution, "The Mamas of Vanuatu can bring to the frontline the use of traditional baskets which are part of our culture. The more we use them, the more we encourage our cultural art of weaving, in turn strengthening the cultural heritage of Vanuatu." She also told the audience, "Let’s revive our traditional woven baskets and move away from plastics. This way we protect our environment and keep our country free from plastic pollution. Also, our woven baskets look way better than plastic bags carrying with it our pride and identity, telling the world who we are and where we come from as a people who hold onto traditional values, practices and are responsible to care for their environment.”

On 23 June 2021, First Lady Tallis and President Moses publicly received their first doses of the Oxford–AstraZeneca COVID-19 vaccine as part of the vaccination campaign during the COVID-19 pandemic in Vanuatu.
