= Viranria Brown =

Vanuatuan diplomat

High Commissioner of Vanuatu to Fiji
- Incumbent
- Assumed office 2 May 2023

High Commissioner of Vanuatu to Fiji (acting)
- In office August 2022 – 2 May 2023
- Preceded by: Nikenike Vurobaravu

Personal details
- Education: University of the South Pacific; Australian National University

Viranria Brown is a Vanutuan diplomat. In August 2022, she was appointed acting High Commissioner to Fiji after her predecessor, former High Commissioner Nikenike Vurobaravu, was elected president of Vanuatu. On 2 May 2023, Brown was formally appointed High Commissioner, becoming the first woman to hold the post since Fiji was granted independence in 1970.

== Biography ==
Brown was raised in the village of Wunpuko on the island of Espiritu Santo, Sanma Province. She obtained a bachelor's degree io international policy and language and a master's degree in diplomacy, both from the University of the South Pacific (USP) in Fiji. Brown then received her second master's degree in international affairs from Australian National University in Canberra.

She joined Air Vanuatu, the country's national airline, as a crew training manager from 1994 to 2008 and acting ground handling general manager from 2009 until 2010. She then joined the national Ministry of Foreign Affairs, International Cooperation and External Trade (MoFAICET) as a senior desk officer for the foreign ministry's Asia/Pacific Division from 2013 to 2015 and the ministry's executive officer from 2015 until 2020.

Brown served as the First Secretary at the Vanuatu High Commission in Suva, Fiji. In August 2022, she was appointed acting High Commissioner to Fiji following the election of her predecessor, Nikenike Vurobaravu, as president of Vanuatu.

In 2023, Foreign Minister Jotham Napat appointed Viranria Brown as the permanent High Commissioner to Fiji, becoming the first woman to hold the diplomatic post since independence. Brown was formally commissioned by President Nikenike Vurobaravu on 2 May 2023.

Brown as also appointed special envoy of the Deputy Prime Minister and Minister of Foreign Affairs to attend the 5th PALM Ministerial Interim Meeting with Japan in February 2024.
