= 2025 in Vanuatu =

- Decades: 2000s; 2010s; 2020s
- See also: Other events of 2025; Timeline of Vanuatuan history

The following lists events of the year 2025 in Vanuatu.

== Incumbents ==
- President: Nikenike Vurobaravu
- Prime Minister: Charlot Salwai (until 11 February); Jotham Napat (since 11 February)

== Events ==
- 16 January: 2025 Vanuatuan general election: No party wins a majority in Parliament, with the Leaders Party of Vanuatu gaining a plurality of 11 seats.
- 27 January: The Leaders Party of Vanuatu, the Vanua'aku Party, the Union of Moderate Parties, the Reunification Movement for Change, the Iauko Group and the Land and Justice Party agree to form a coalition government.
- 11 February: Jotham Napat of the Leaders Party is elected prime minister by parliament.
- 23 July: The International Court of Justice, acting on a case led by Vanuatu, rules that climate change is an "existential threat" and that countries failing to meet their climate obligations could be in breach of international law and liable to reparations claims by affected countries.

== Holidays ==
- 1 January – New Year's Day
- 21 February – Father Lini Day
- 5 March – Custom Chief's Day
- 18 April – Good Friday
- 19 April – Easter Saturday
- 21 April – Easter Monday
- 1 May – Labour Day
- 29 May – Ascension Day
- 24 July – Children's Day
- 30 July – Independence Day
- 15 August – Assumption Day
- 5 October – Constitution Day
- 29 November – National Unity Day
- 25 December – Christmas Day
- 26 December – Boxing Day

== Deaths ==
- 10 November – Ham Lin̄i, 73, prime minister (2004–2008)
