= Rima Vurobaravu =

Vanuatuan politician (born c. 1968)

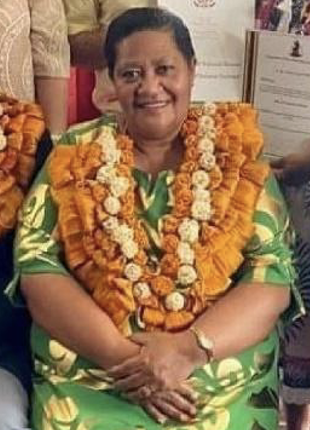
- Vurobaravu in 2022

First Lady of Vanuatu
- Incumbent
- Assumed office 23 July 2022
- President: Nikenike Vurobaravu
- Preceded by: Estella Moses Tallis

Personal details
- Born: c, 1968
- Spouse: Nikenike Vurobaravu
- Children: Four

Rima Vurobaravu (born c. 1968) is a Vanuatuan civil servant and banker. She currently serves as the First Lady of Vanuatu since July 2022 as the wife of President Nikenike Vurobaravu.

== Biography ==
Vurobaravu, who was born circa 1968, is from Malo island, Sanma Province, Vanuatu. She is married to Nikenike Vurobaravu, who was elected president of Vanuatu in 2022. The couple have four children and two granddaughters.

Vurobarevu began her career at the Vanuatu Ministry of Education and Training (MoET), where she worked for eight years. She then joined ANZ bank She worked in community development and customer service roles at ANZ for over 20 years.

Vurobaravu engaged in international diplomacy and protocol through her role as the wife of a politician and diplomat. In 2005, Nikenike Vurobaravu became a diplomat stationed at the United Nations. Following her husband's appointment as Vanuatu's High Commissioner to Fiji in 2015 (and again from 2017 to 2022), Vurobaravu took on the role of the high commissioner's wife at diplomatic events in Fiji.

In 2022, Nikenike VuroBaravu was elected president, making Rima Vurobaravu the new first lady of Vanuatu. During her tenure as first lady, Vurobaravu has focused on women's issues and oversaw the move to the new State House, the presidential residence which completed construction in 2024.
