= Franceville, New Hebrides =

1889–90 commune in present-day Port Vila, Vanuatu

Coordinates: 17°44′15″S 168°18′50″E

Independent Commune of Franceville Commune Indépendante de Franceville (French)
- 1889–1890
- Flag

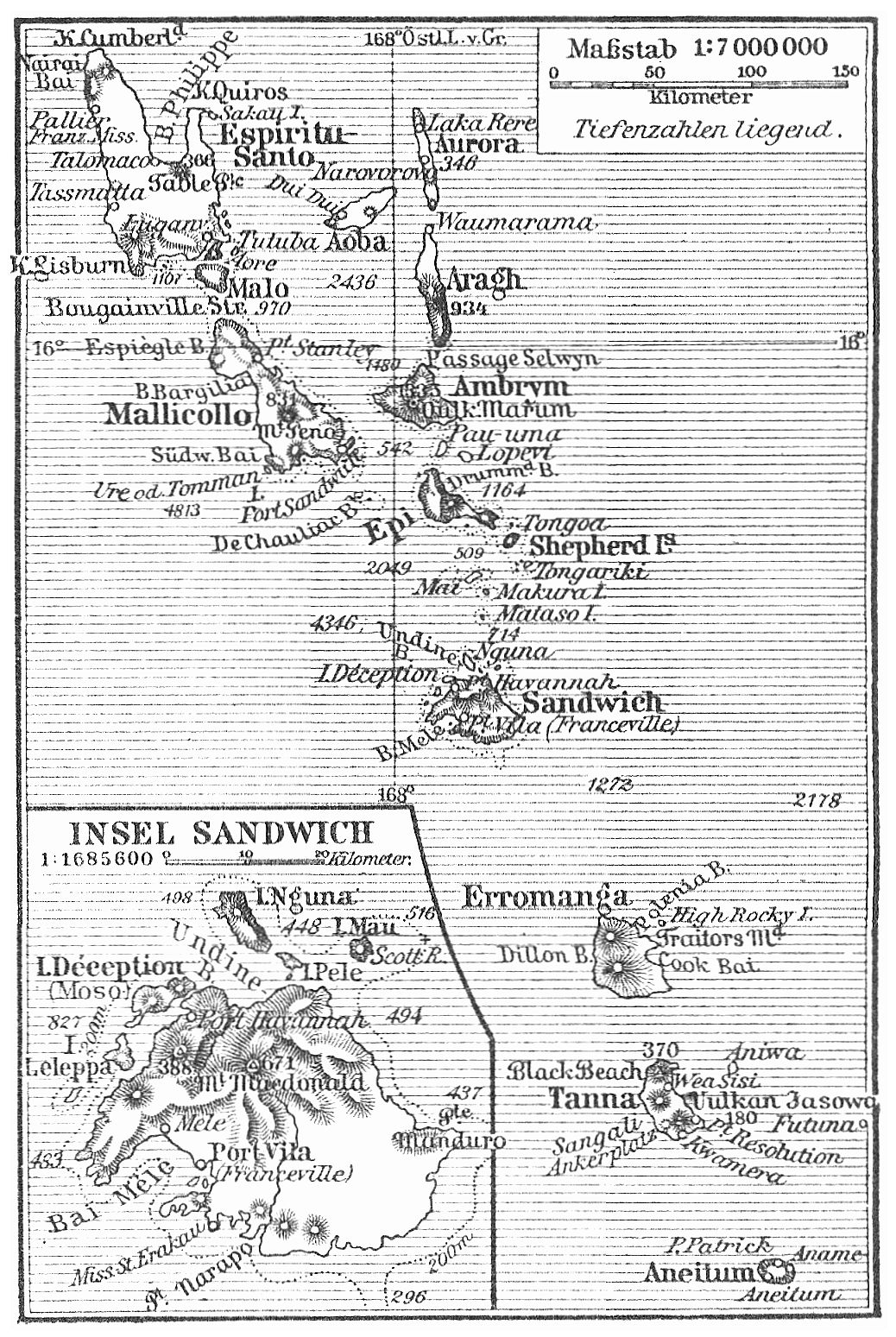
- 1905 map of New Hebrides, still showing Franceville as alternative name for Port Vila
- Status: Unrecognized state
- Common languages: French, Bislama
- Government: Republic
  - 1889: Ferdinand Chevillard
  - 1890?: R. D. Polk
- Deputy (legislator)
  - 1889–1890: Comte Maurice de Nolhac
- Historical era: New Imperialism
  - Established: August 9 1889
  - Disestablished: June 1890

Population
  - 1889: 540
Preceded by	Succeeded by
Anglo-French Joint Naval Commission	Anglo-French Joint Naval Commission

Franceville (present-day Port Vila) was a municipality located on Efate, or Sandwich Island. It was established in 1889 in order to gain basic legal status, during the period when the New Hebrides was a neutral territory under the loose jurisdiction of the Anglo-French Joint Naval Commission.

== Background ==
In 1878, the United Kingdom and France declared all of the New Hebrides to be neutral territory. For the protection of the French and British citizens in New Hebrides, the Anglo-French Joint Naval Commission was established under the Convention of 16 October 1887. However, the convention claimed no jurisdiction over internal native affairs.

The lack of a functional government led to rising discontent among the colonists. The French were especially inconvenienced because French law only recognized marriages when contracted under a civil authority (the nearest one being in New Caledonia), whereas British law recognized marriages conducted by local clergy.

== History ==
On 9 August 1889, Franceville declared itself an independent commune under the leadership of elected mayor/president Ferdinand-Albert Chevillard, and with its own red, white and blue flag with five stars.

This community became one of the first self-governing entities in recorded history to practice universal suffrage without distinction of sex or race. Although the district's population at the time consisted of about 500 natives and fewer than 50 whites, only white males were permitted to hold office. One of its elected presidents was R. D. Polk, a native of Tennessee and relative of James K. Polk.

The new government was soon suppressed, and by June 1890, Franceville as a commune was reported to have been "practically broken up." An 1891 census reported 29 adult Europeans, making it the largest European settlement in the New Hebrides. In 1906, the naval commission was replaced by a more structured British-French Condominium.

== See also ==
- History of Vanuatu
- Port Vila
- Timeline of women's suffrage
