= 2023 in Vanuatu =

- Decades: 2000s; 2010s; 2020s
- See also: Other events of 2023; Timeline of Vanuatuan history

The following lists events of the year 2023 in Vanuatu.

== Incumbents ==
- President: Nikenike Vurobaravu
- Prime Minister: Ishmael Kalsakau (until 4 September); Sato Kilman (until 6 October); Charlot Salwai onwards

== Events ==
- 5 January – Sato Kilman orders an investigation into the Vanuatu People's Investment and Equity Fund after failing to deliver on promised financial returns.
- 8 January – A 7.0 magnitude earthquake strikes offshore near Sanma, Vanuatu.
- 1 February – The East Epi submarine volcano erupts in Epi, Vanuatu, for the first time since 2004, sending ash 300 feet into the air, with a 10 kilometer radius danger zone.
- 8 August – The prime minister of Vanuatu Ishmael Kalsakau reshuffles the cabinet and appoints two new ministers ahead of a no-confidence vote.
- 16 August – Prime Minister of Vanuatu Ishmael Kalsakau survives a no-confidence vote, with the opposition falling one vote short to oust him.
- 17 August – Opposition parties in Vanuatu boycott the parliament after the failed attempt to oust prime minister Ishmael Kalsakau.
- 4 September – The parliament of Vanuatu elects Sato Kilman as the new prime minister, replacing Ishmael Kalsakau.
- 6 October – Charlot Salwai is elected as Prime Minister of Vanuatu following a no-confidence vote in Sato Kilman.
- 26 October – Cyclone Lola downgrades after leaving widespread damage in Vanuatu.
