= 2020 in Vanuatu =

- Decades: 2000s; 2010s; 2020s
- See also: Other events of 2020; Timeline of Vanuatuan history

Events from 2020 in Vanuatu.

== Incumbents ==
- President: Tallis Obed Moses
- Prime Minister: Charlot Salwai (until 20 April) Bob Loughman (from 20 April)

== Events ==
Ongoing – COVID-19 pandemic in Oceania

=== March ===
- 22 March – The country's health authorities confirmed that tests for a resort worker with a suspected case of COVID-19 had returned negative.
- 26 March – President Tallis Obed Moses declared a state of emergency in the country after a tourist on a cruise ship visiting the island of Aneityum had tested positive for the virus.

=== April ===
- 3 April – As a preemptive measure and despite not having any cases, travel restrictions and quarantine measures were put in place for those entering the country.
- 25 April – The country announced that it would be scheduling their Women's Super League cricket final on Saturday and streaming it live on social media.

=== August ===
- 5 August – Former prime minister Charlot Salwai is referred to the Supreme Court to stand trial for alleged corruption. His lawyer says he is confident they will win the case.

=== September ===
- 10 September – It is announced that former Prime Minister Charlot Salwai is set to stand trial for November 23, charged with ten counts of bribery and corruption.
- 18 September – Opposition leader Ralph Regenvanu warns about the sale of honorary Vanuatuan citizenship to potential international criminals and people stripped of other nationalities for nefarious activities. The government says it has stopped selling its citizenship but promises further investigation into the matter.

=== December ===
- 4 December – Vanuatu officially graduates from the United Nations official list of Least Developed Countries (LDC) becoming the sixth nation to ever do so. The UN Committee for Development Policy recommended for Vanuatu for graduation in 2012. In 2012, the Economic and Social Council and in 2013 the General Assembly approved the recommendation, however after Cyclone Pam, the country was granted an extension until 2020.
