= Women in Vanuatu =

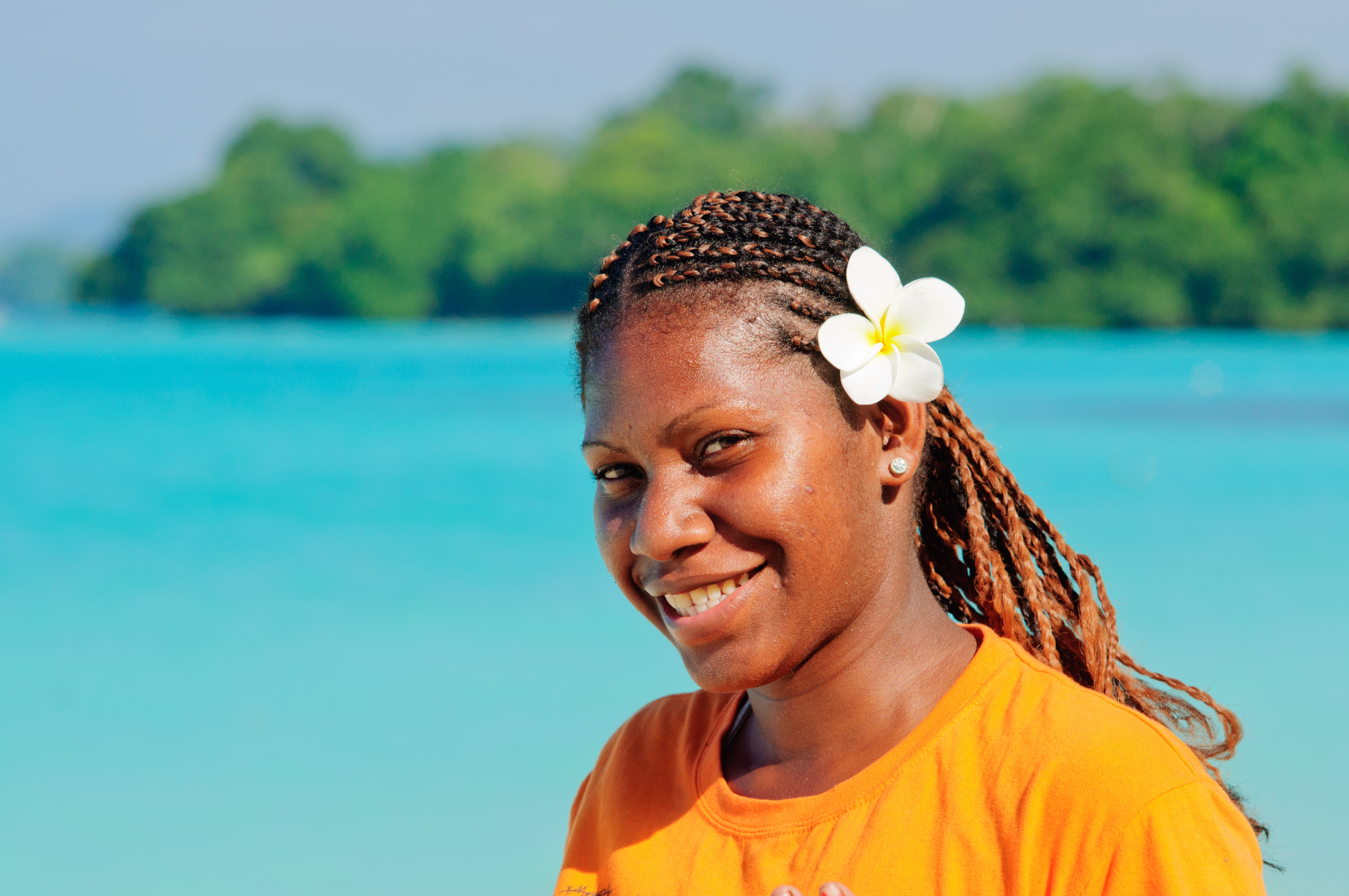
A portrait of a young Vanuatuan woman, September 2012.

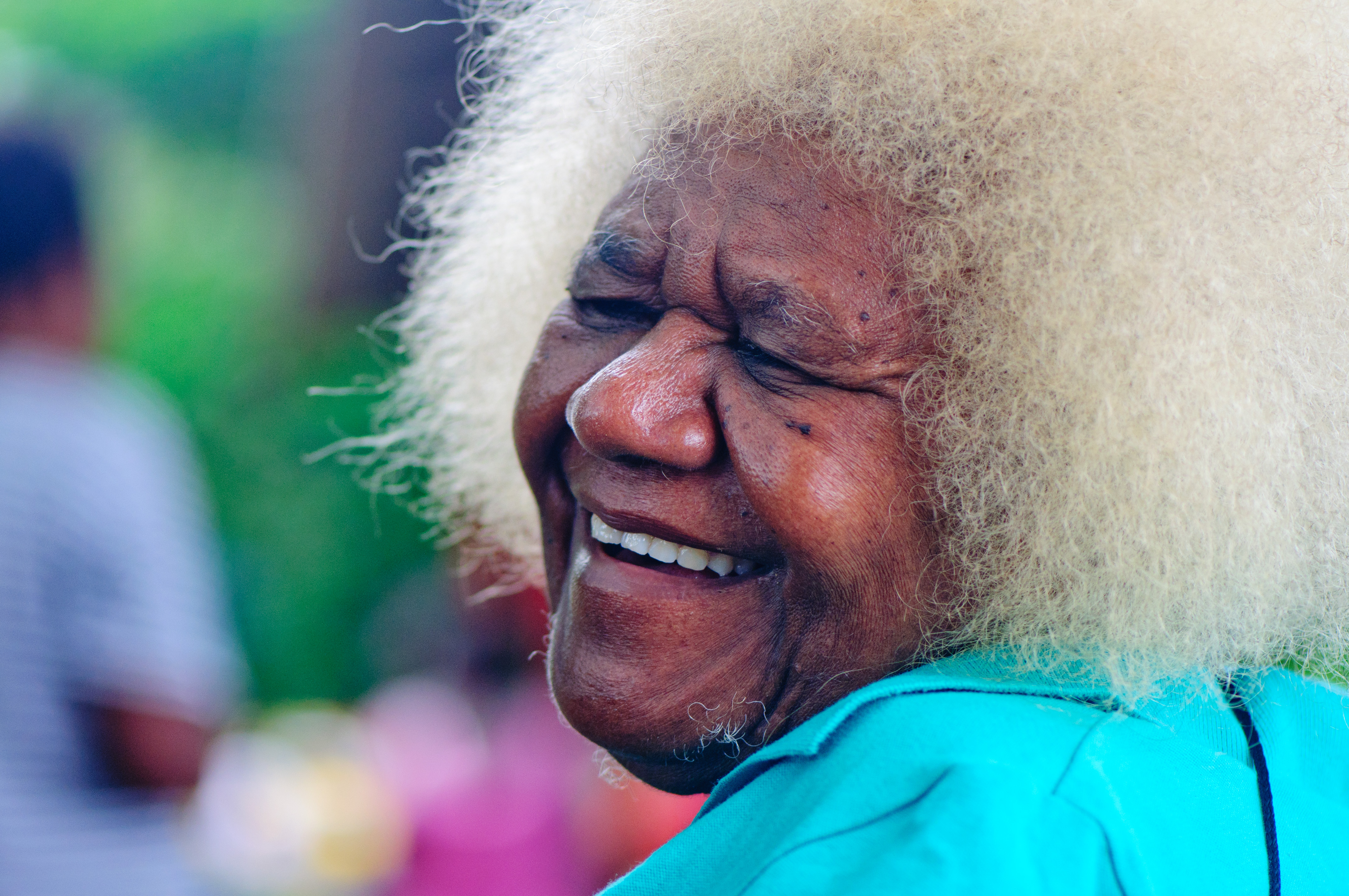
A portrait of an old woman from Vanuatu, September 2012.

Women in Vanuatu are women who live in or are from Vanuatu. This includes their education, healthcare, political, and economic information.

== General Information ==
In relation to the labor force, based on data in 2006, Vanuatuan women workers comprised 49.6% of the workforce of Vanuatu.

According to UN Women, women in Vanuatu play a significant role in the fields of "civil service and the public sector". Under the 30-year-long democracy of Vanuatu, the women of Vanuatu are under-represented in the political arena of Vanuatu. At any one time, there have been a maximum of two women members out of a total of fifty-two members of the parliament of Vanuatu. There were 3.8% of women in Vanuatu who held seats in said parliament. They are also under-represented at the local (provincial and municipal) levels of politics.

Despite being under-represented in politics and making a living in a "male dominated and largely patriarchal society", the World Bank reported in April 2009 that Vanuatuan women are increasingly becoming involved in "private sector development and in the market economy".

== Education ==
In Vanuatu, attending school is not mandated by the state and girls have low attendance compared with their male counterparts. Reasons for low attendance stem from lack of compulsory requirement, not enough support by both family and state, with the larger issue being lack of infrastructure supporting female menstruation. Little hygienic resources such as bathrooms, toilets, and feminine hygiene products cause most girls to drop out of school. Cultural factors and gender roles of Vanuatu girls also affect if they can go to school and how often as many girls are married at a young age. Along with a Vanuatu woman's place being at home while the male population works and is educated. While overall literacy rate is 87.5%, adult female literacy is 54%. There are efforts to raise that number with grassroots projects like Mama’s English Class, which go to villages empowering women through literacy. Lack of literacy can severely hold women back economically in Vanuatu with male authority held in higher esteem than women in leadership roles in almost all areas of life. There are large disparities between women who are educated and those who are little to no education.

== Healthcare ==
Although there have been great steps taken to meld traditional culture for the equity of all persons (especially women), healthcare is still a concern as 79% of the population live rural areas. The concern of respiratory illness from the smoke of cooking oils on women, children, and the elderly was focused on by the delegation drafting the Environment Act. Along with maternal health services that are needed in rural areas of Vanuatu to lower mother and infant mortality rates.

During the aftermath of Cyclone Pam (March 27, 2015), Women in Vanuatu waited for healthcare aid by blocking the road. An overwhelmed United Nations Population Fund (UNFPA) team distributed 400 initial dignity kits and other feminine hygiene to women and lactating mothers. As with many humanitarian situations, women and girls were not prioritized in the national relief effort responses.

While Vanuatu’s reproductive and sexual health for females and girls is some of the highest in the region, it also has a high adolescent birth rate (ages 15 – 19) in the region. Even with a high contraception use rate, around 20-30% of women in partnerships/marriages do not have access to contraceptives. Nearly two-thirds of the female population have encountered and experienced physical and sexual violence. That being said, usually the decision to use contraceptives is not without fear of this type of violence occurring to her personally. The Ministry of Health continues to survey and map the sexual and reproductive needs of women for improvement to the system. While hospitals and Health Centres have a wide range of reproductive health support, aid posts do not have enough supplies nor staffing and funding. Aid Posts, however, are run through Village Health Worker Program reporting mechanisms, restricting knowledge of the activities of an Aid Post. Gender equity and equality programs are needed in order to help in the effort to lower gender-based violence and sexual harassment (rape, molestation, etc).

== Politics & Economics ==
Economically speaking, the females in Vanuatu have been working toward gender and climate reforms within the government. As men are afforded opportunities that women in Vanuatu culture do not have, there is a push for economic equity. The IFC and government reports show that women can make a significantly large economic profit when given the opportunity. However, with the growing domestic abuse of women and the expectation that they will work a double workday (occupational and domestic) due to the male-dominated and patriarchal based societal constructs and traditions. Political, women are working to get improved policy dialogue, legal framework, business training, and other equity opportunities in legislation for the benefit of women in Vanuatu. Especially as while a minority, women make-up and have a significant part in the business within Vanuatu.

Vanuatu’s first female-only political party has been created to help females get elected into positions of leadership within the government. This is due to there being very few females in parliament. For example, in 1987, Hilda Lini was the first female to be elected to parliament and while there have been a few women to follow her, they do not hold a large percentage in the government. Especially, in a male-dominated political field, it is difficult to see gender-equity and equality when as Andrina Thomas says, political parties “are just using women as mere decorations and paying lip service to gender equality”. By having a female-only political party, there is hope that decisions on the well-being on citizens will be more ethical, diverse, and equal between genders.

Cultural Politics also affect women in Vanuatu as they have an expectation to wear national dress exclusively while also having contemporary desires to dress. This “mother” shapeless floral frock is supposed to represent the modest and Christian/tradition abiding woman. Originally, Vanuatu women were made to wear them by missionaries to symbolize modesty in an ideal viewpoint from western culture. Young women have begun redefine what this looks like through modernity by way of long, loose surf shorts and shirts. The island dress is a representation of national identity through an everyday costume. While this dress is tied to Vanuatu identity, the cultural connotations do not mean anything to new young generations of women. This is changing cultural politics in Vanuatu and how women are represented and dress. The dress has deep implications of women’s bodies having moral context beyond themselves, making young women wish to change this narrative through their own cultural politics based in their own dress.

== See also ==
- Demographics of Vanuatu
- Culture of Vanuatu
