= Andrina Thomas =

Politician, researcher, and activist in Vanuatu

Andrina Komala Lini Thomas is a politician, researcher, and activist in Vanuatu. Since 2019, she has been the founding secretary-general of the Leleon Vanua Democratic Party, a women's party seeking to close the significant gender gap in Vanuatuan politics. She ran for Parliament in 2020, then as a candidate for president in the 2022 Vanuatuan elections, but was not elected.

== Early life and education ==
Andrina Thomas is descended from the Na Vuhu Sule clan of Matantas Village on the island of Espiritu Santo in Vanuatu.

She attended the University of the South Pacific in Fiji, graduating with a bachelor's in public administration and, in 2003, an MBA. She later attended the University of Waikato in New Zealand, where she obtained a doctorate in business leadership and governance in 2013. She was the second Ni-Vanuatu woman to earn a doctoral degree.

== Career ==
Thomas has worked for various NGOs and government agencies in Vanuatu. She also represented the government of Vanuatu at international climate conferences.

In May 2015, she was appointed as CEO of the Vanuatuan government's investment arm, the Vanuatu Investment Promotion Authority, becoming the first Ni-Vanuatu woman to hold the position. She was suspended for a period in 2016, but retained the title until 2017.

== Politics ==
Thomas has been an activist for women's inclusion and empowerment in Vanuatuan society, and against femicide in the country.

In 2019, the Leleon Vanua Democratic Party was founded as Vanuatu's first woman-led political party, with Thomas as its secretary-general. Its aim was to improve women's representation in Vanuatuan politics; at the time, there were no women in the Parliament of Vanuatu. The party eventually opted not to contest the 2020 election due to a lack of funding, but Thomas and other candidates still ran as independents or representing other parties; in her case, she ran as a candidate for the Oceania Transformation Movement in the Espirito Santo rural constituency. However, none of the female candidates were elected, leaving the Parliament exclusively male.

In 2022, Thomas ran as a candidate for president of Vanuatu from the Leleon Vanua Democratic Party. She lost to Nikenike Vurobaravu. She and Lois Fatu were the only female candidates across a field of a dozen aspirants.
