= 2024 in Vanuatu =

- Decades: 2000s; 2010s; 2020s
- See also: Other events of 2024; Timeline of Vanuatuan history

The following lists events of the year 2024 in Vanuatu.

== Incumbents ==
- President: Nikenike Vurobaravu
- Prime Minister: Charlot Salwai

== Events ==
- 10 May: Air Vanuatu, the country's flag carrier, is voluntarily placed in liquidation by the Government of Vanuatu.
- 29 May: 2024 Vanuatuan constitutional referendum: Vanuatuans hold the first national constitutional referendum to vote on amendments related to party switching.
- 30 June: New Zealand beats Vanuatu 3–0 in the OFC Men's Nations Cup final at VFF Freshwater Stadium in Port Vila. The Man of the Match is Liberato Cacace.
- 15 July: The Pacific Partnership 24-2 takes place in Vanuatu, concluding with a closing ceremony and the opening of the new U.S. Embassy in Port Vila.
- 23 July: Vanuatu leads a diplomatic effort at the International Court of Justice to rule that states must protect human rights and phase out fossil fuels to address climate change.
- 2-13 December: Vanuatu and the Melanesian Spearhead Group present an opening appeal at "landmark hearings" in the International Court of Justice (ICJ) requesting the ICJ to establish responsibilities for climate change under international law.
- 17 December: A magnitude 7.3 earthquake strikes in the Coral Sea, 19 miles west of Port Vila, killing at least 12 people.
