= Arthur Francis Basset Hull =

Australian philatelist

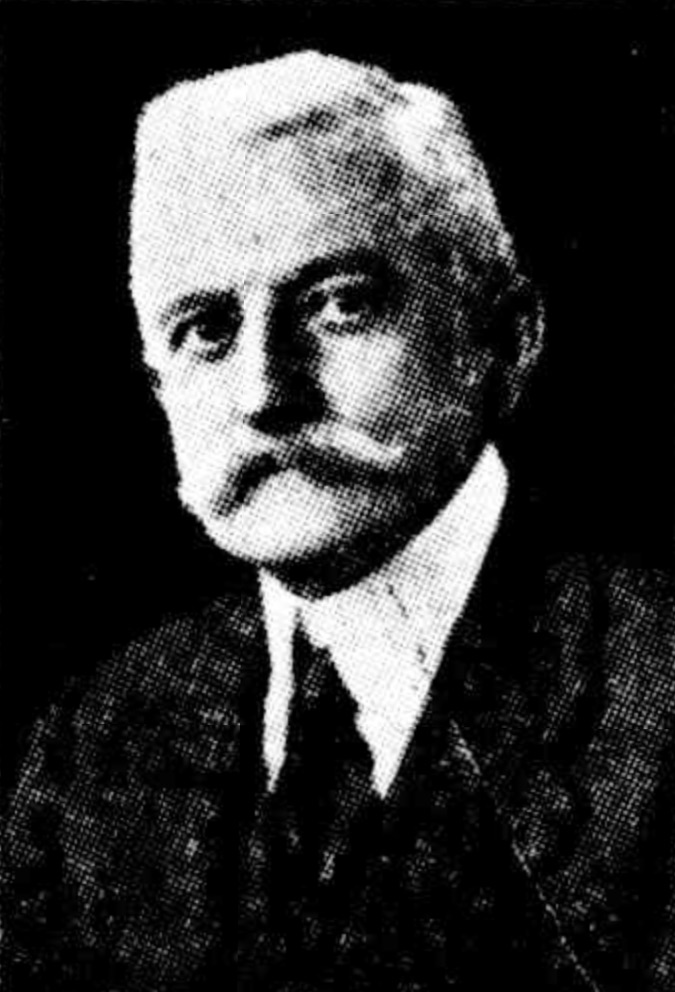
Arthur Francis Basset Hull in 1921

Arthur Francis Basset Hull MBE (1862–1945) was an Australian public servant, naturalist and philatelist. He signed the Roll of Distinguished Philatelists in 1921.

== Tasmania ==
Hull was born on 10 October 1862 in Hobart.

In 1883–1889 Hull worked as clerk in the Supreme Court. In 1880s, Hull worked as secretary and treasurer for the Orpheus Club. In 1888 he published a series of short stories called A Strange Experience.

== Career ==
On 12 October 1892 Hull moved to Sydney to work as clerk for the General Post Officer. On 1 July 1900, Hull received a transfer to the Department of Public Works as a secretary to labour commissioners. In January 1903 Hull worked in Department of Mines until his retirement in 1921.

Hull worked as secretary and president to Royal Zoological Society of New South Wales from 1917–1919, 1928–1929 and 1938–1939. Hull was a member of Taronga Zoological Park Trust from 1926. Hull served as president Royal Australasian Ornithologists' Union in 1919–1920 and the Linnean Society in 1923–1924 also publishing in their journal publications. From 1917–1945, Hull worked with Australia Museum as honorary ornithologist.

== Philately ==
From childhood, Hull collected stamps. He was an honorary fellow of the Royal Philatelic Society London, from 1887. Hull published many articles including Stamps of Tasmania, The Postage Stamps of New South Wales and The Postage Stamps of Queensland. He designed a series of local stamps for the Australasian New Hebrides Company in 1897. In 1941 he presented a paper on "History on Australian Postage Stamps" to the Royal Australian History Society.

Hull was appointed a Member of the British Empire in the 1936 New Year Honours for "service as a member of Taronga Park Trust and honorary ornithologist, at the Australian Museum".

== Personal life ==
At age 15, Hull suffered polio and had to wear a surgical boot and use a walking stick for the rest of his life.

On 29 April 1891 at Congregational Church, Newtown Hull married Laura Blanche Nisbet. The couple lived at The Abbey, Annandale where Laura gave birth to a son in July 1893, but she died less than a month later. In March 1899 Hull was sued by Bertha Cligny de Boissac for breach of marriage promise. Hull was unable to pay Boissac £500 in damages he was forced to declare bankruptcy. At Annandale on 15 January 1902, Hull married Caroline Ann Lloyd. In 1912 Hull divorced his second wife. On 3 December 1926 in Manly he married Diana Farley. Hull died on 22 September 1945 and was cremated with Anglican rites.

== Selected publications ==
- Tom Iredale; A.F. Bassett Hull (1926). "A monograph of the Australian loricates (Phylum Mollusca – Order Loricata). VI". Australian Zoologist. 4: 164–185. ISSN 0067-2238. Wikidata Q111794233.
- Tom Iredale; A.F. Basset Hull (1926). "A monograph of the Australian loricates (Phylum Mollusca - Order Loricata). VII". Australian Zoologist. 4: 256–276. ISSN 0067-2238. Wikidata Q111794172.
- Tom Iredale; A.F. Basset Hull (1924). "A monograph of the Australian loricates (Phylum Mollusca - Order Loricata). III". Australian Zoologist. 3: 277–297. ISSN 0067-2238. Wikidata Q111788747.
- Ashby, E. & Hull, A.F.B. 1923. The Polyplacophora of King Island, Bass Strait, with description of a new subspecies. The Australian Zoologist 3: 79–84 pl. 8
- Bassett-Hull, A.F. 1910. The Birds of Lord Howe and Norfolk Islands. Proceedings of the Linnean Society of New South Wales 34: 636–693
- Campbell, A.J., Milligan, A.W., Legg, W.V., Mellor, J.W., Basset Hull, A.F. & Hall, R. 1913. Official Check–list of the Birds of Australia. The Emu 12(Suppl.): 1-116
