= Australasian New Hebrides Company =

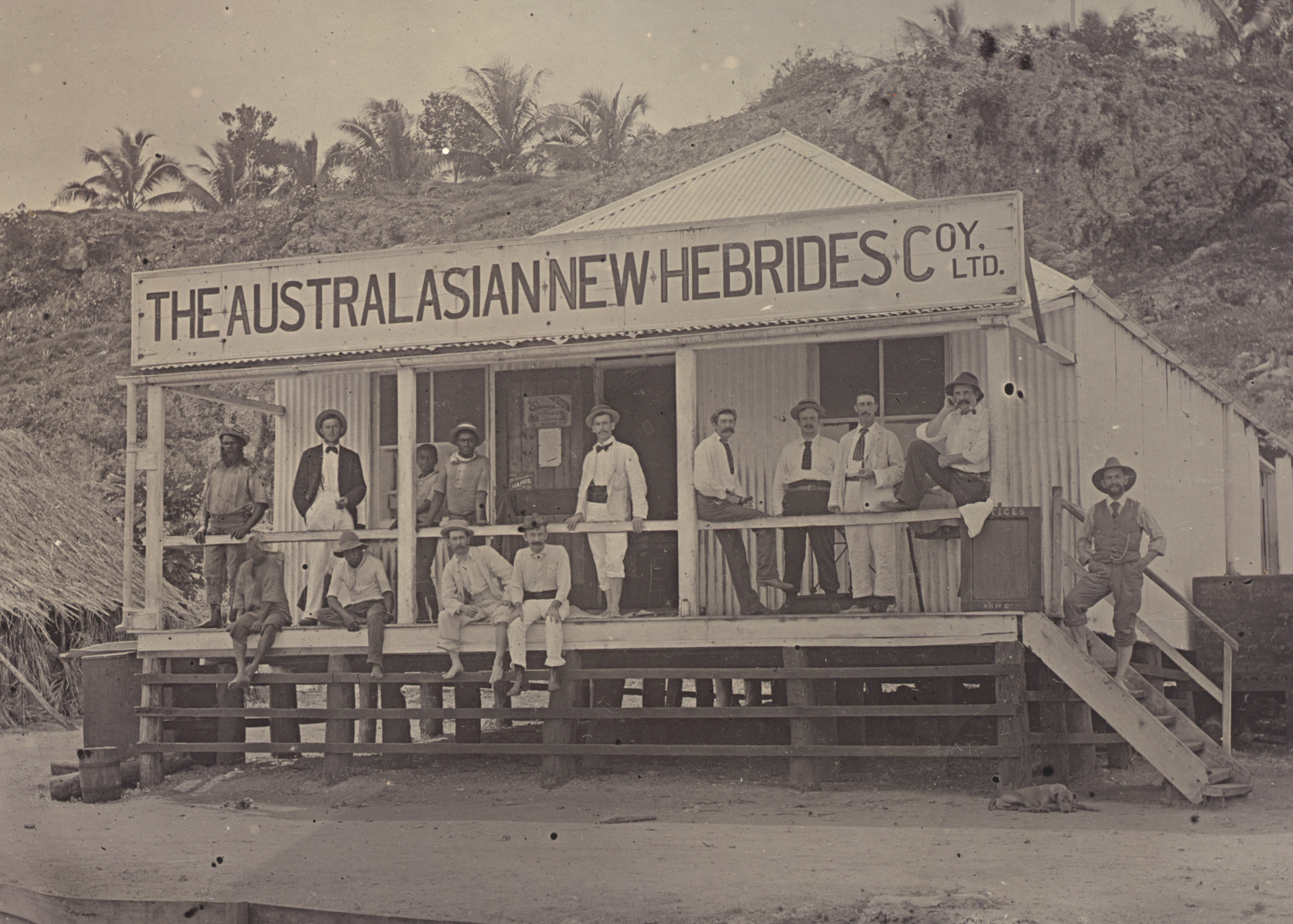
ANHC store at Vila on the island of Efate

The Australasian New Hebrides Company (ANHC) was a trading enterprise in the New Hebrides (present-day Vanuatu). It was first incorporated in 1889 in the colony of New South Wales and was intended to counter French influence in the islands, which had been declared a neutral territory under the Anglo-French Joint Naval Commission.

== Background and formation ==
The Australasian New Hebrides Company was established in Sydney in 1889 under the laws of the colony of New South Wales. An Anglo-French Joint Naval Commission had been established the previous year to supervise European missionaries and traders on the islands. Australian business leaders and politicians were concerned that France intended to annex the islands, prejudicing their commercial interests, while Protestant church leaders. Previous efforts to establish a trading company had been proposed by the Presbyterian Church of Victoria in 1883 and 1886, modelled on the Compagnie Calédonienne des Nouvelles-Hébrides established by John Higginson in 1882.

Presbyterian missionary Daniel Macdonald led efforts to capitalise the new firm. He approached Victorian MPs James Service and Robert Harper to recruit shareholders from Melbourne's business community, including shipping magnate Malcolm McEacharn and banker Henry Gyles Turner. In New South Wales, Dugald Thomson became a shareholder and director, while in Queensland experienced traders James Burns and Robert Philp – the founders of Burns, Philp & Co. – also took a personal stake in the company. By 1891, the ANHC had paid-up capital of £4,600 (equivalent to $1,000,000 in 2022) with 39 shareholders, almost equally divided between New South Wales and Victoria.

== Operations ==
=== Trading activities ===
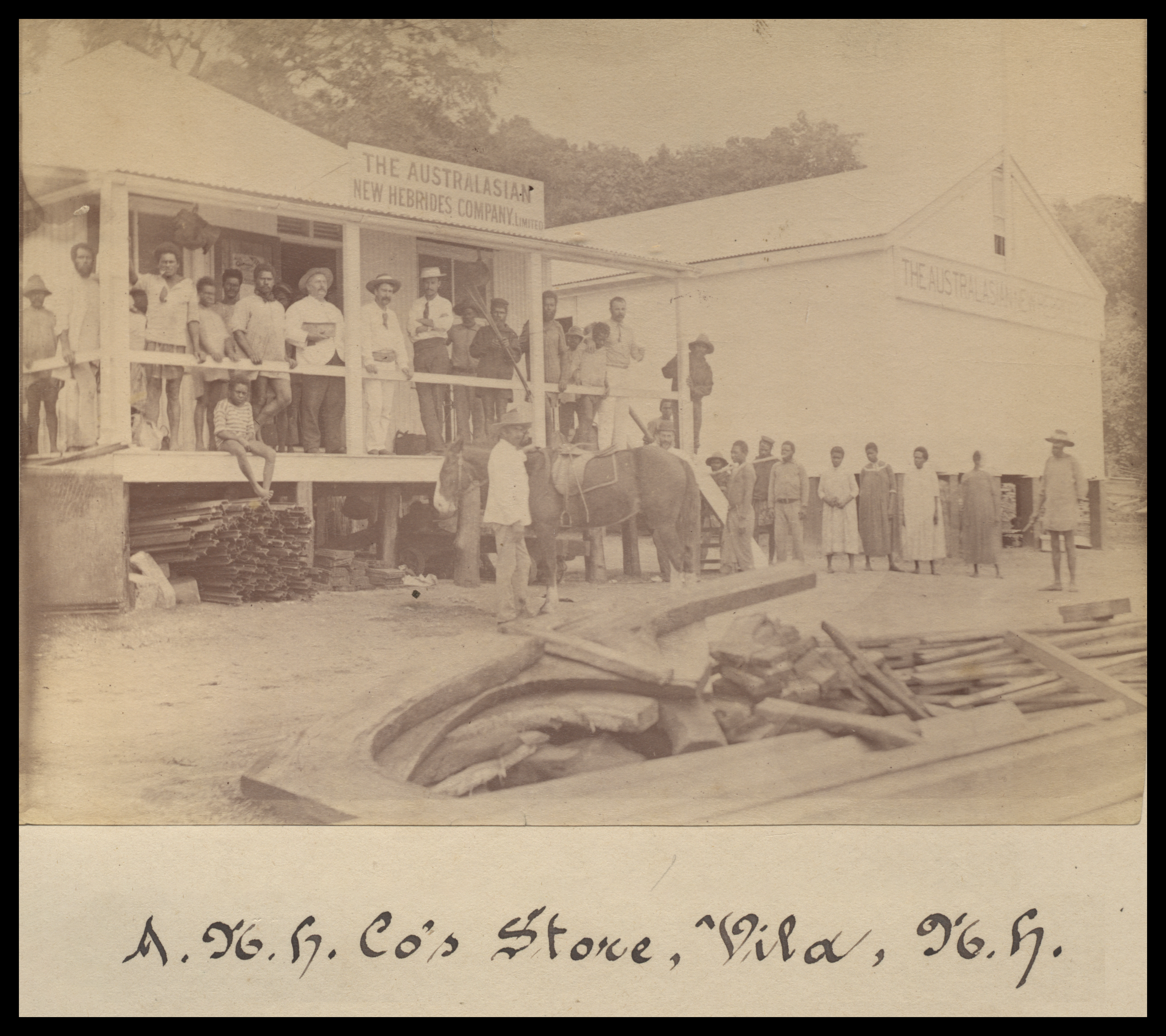
Exterior of the ANHC in Vila

The ANHC initially established a "floating trade store" on a Australasian United Steam Navigation Company steamer, with the Presbyterian Church and Burns, Philp having lobbied the New South Wales government to increase its subsidy for the New Hebrides inter-island shipping service. The trading operation sold supplies and equipment to European missionaries, planters and traders, returning to Australia with copra and other produce. A physical store was subsequently established at Vila on Efate.

=== Land purchases and colonisation efforts ===
By 1891, the ANHC had expended £2,123 on land purchases, including 10,000 acres (4,000 ha) on the south coast of Espiritu Santo opposite the Presbyterian mission at Tangoa. The land was offered for lease to Australian settlers who established coffee and maize plantations. The settlement scheme collapsed after the murder of Peter Sawers by labourers from a neighbouring plantation in September 1891.

=== Postal service ===
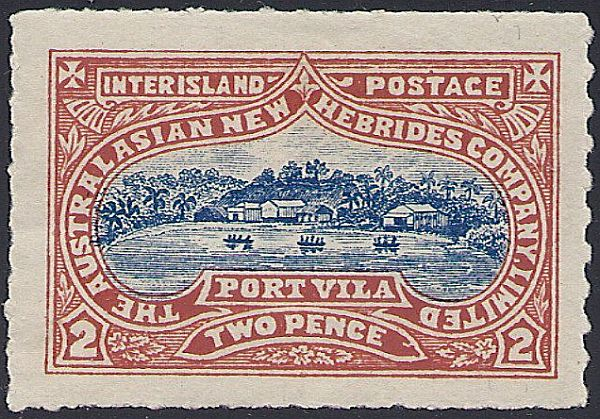
1897 ANHC stamp

In 1897, the ANHC issued two local stamps for the carriage of mail on its inter-island steamer service. Mail travelling beyond the islands was required to also carry a New South Wales stamp. The stamps were designed by Arthur Francis Basset Hull and printed in Sydney by John Sands and featured a view of Vila.

== Liquidations and legacy ==
The ANHC was liquidated in 1893 and reconstituted as a new company of the same name, with notional capital of £10,000. Burns, Philp became the major shareholder and the companies shared common management.

== Sources ==
- Thompson, Roger C. (1971). "Commerce, Christianity and Colonialism: The Australasian New Hebrides Company, 1883-1897". The Journal of Pacific History. 6: 25–38.
