= Vanuatu Labor Corps =

Labor unit of the United States Army and the United States Navy

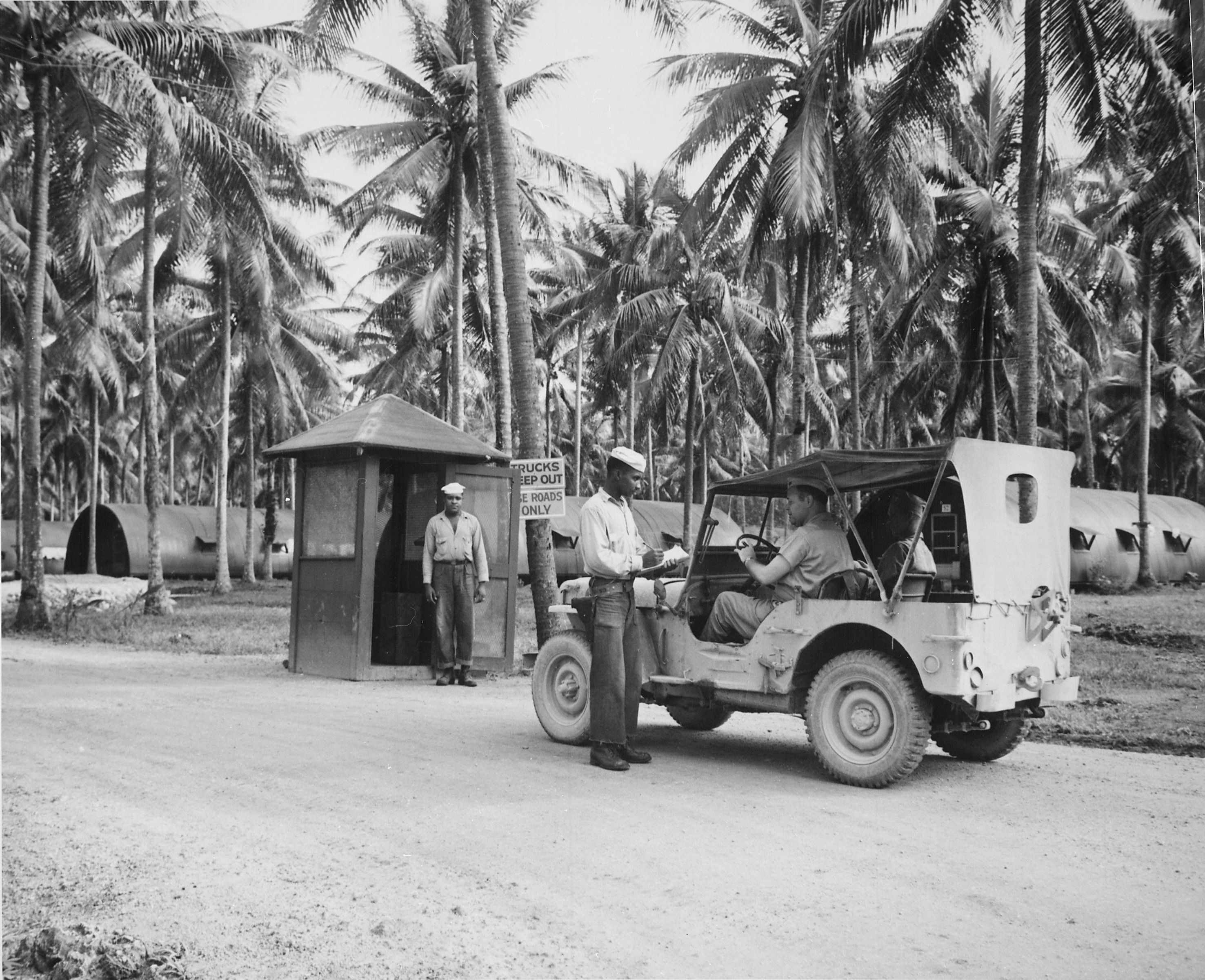
- Entrance to the U.S. Navy Base Camp Annex, Espiritu Santo
- Active: 1942–1945
- Country: New Hebrides
- Allegiance: United States
- Branch: Army, Navy
- Role: Labor
- Size: 1,000–10,000
- Engagements: World War II

The Vanuatu Labor Corps was a labor unit of the United States Army and the United States Navy, consisting of New Hebrides natives. The unit was established in 1942 and dissolved in 1945. During its service it provided crucial logistical support to the Allied war effort during the Guadalcanal Campaign. It was jointly led by Major George Riser and Thomas Beatty, while its size fluctuated between 1,000 and 10,000 men.

== Background ==
Following the Japanese attack on Pearl Harbor, the United States officially entered the Pacific War on the side of the Allies. In an attempt to halt the rapid Japanese expansion southward, which threatened Australia's marine communication lines, American troops occupied the Anglo-French New Hebrides Condominium in early 1942. The first American troops landed on Efate in March, establishing joint rule with the colonial authorities. In May, the construction of a large airfield was initiated amidst the arrival of reinforcements. American military facilities were erected in Port Vila, Port Havannah and Espiritu Santo. Those included eight coastwatching stations, ammunition depots, airfields, ports, encampments and water supply systems. They played an important role as a transit point for the transportation of military equipment and the evacuation of wounded personnel during the course of the Guadalcanal Campaign. At the peak of the campaign Espiritu Santo became the second-largest American base in the Pacific, housing 40,000 people. By 1943, the New Hebrides had lost much of their strategic importance and the bases shifted their focus to rear line support.

== Service ==
The arising situation necessitated the recruitment of indigenous Ni-Vanuatu population into a labor unit. At first, the Americans used the colonial authorities as middlemen during the hiring process as they had previously done with Solomon Islands Labour Corps and the Australian New Guinea Administrative Unit. However frequent disagreements between the French and the British in combination with complaints from the laborers regarding the quality of the food they were served, prompted the Americans to assume control. By the end of 1942, the Vanuatu Labor Corps numbered 1,000 people who worked three-month-long tours each. Once the labor resources of Efate had been exhausted recruits started coming from Tanna, Ambae and smaller islands eventually swelling the unit's numbers to 10,000 men. Workers were separated into 20-man groups, led by a single person who could speak the local language, Bislama. Those were divided between the US Army and US Navy, and supervised by Major George Riser and Thomas Beatty respectively.

While the recruits had to build their own huts for accommodation, other necessities such as food, clothing, dogtags, medical care and cigarettes were provided for them by the American military. Workers were paid 7.50 USD per month, with the wages purposefully lowered as colonial authorities feared post-war inflation. They also imposed restrictions on the attire, eating habits, length of contracts, the number of workers and their interactions with foreigners. Those were dropped once the Americans took over the unit's management. The men normally worked 10-hour days, with a single day off every 14 days. Tasks performed included stevedoring, mosquito eradication, hospital work and supply delivery. Although no member of the corps died in combat, deaths from disease, work-related accidents and overwork were not uncommon. The formation was dissolved following the departure of the Americans from the island in 1945. The mass participation of Ni-Vanuatu men in the Labor Corps had a significant effect on the John Frum movement, giving it the characteristics of a cargo cult.

== General and cited references ==
- Jolly, Margaret (2016). "Men of War, Men of Peace: Changing Masculinities in Vanuatu". The Asia Pacific Journal of Anthropology. 17 (3–4: Emergent Masculinities in the Pacific): 305–323. doi:10.1080/14442213.2016.1191531. hdl:1885/213607. S2CID 157760230.
- Lindstrom, Lamont (1991). The Vanuatu Labor Corps Experience (PDF). Occasional Paper 36. Honolulu: Center for Pacific Studies, University of Hawaiʻi at Mānoa. pp. 47–58. ISSN 0897-8905.
