= Sinking of the MV Matui =

2026 maritime disaster

Details
- Date: 11 September 2026
- Location: Vanuatu waters between Santo and Ambae
- Country: Vanuatu
- Cause: Overloading, poor weather conditions

Statistics
- Vehicles: MV Matui
- Deaths: 2
- Missing: 38

On September 11, 2026, the Vanuatuan ferry MV Matui sank in the waters between Santo and Ambae in Vanuatu. The disaster resulted in at least two deaths, with 14 survivors accounted for and 38 remaining missing.

== Search efforts ==
The search did not begin until some 30 hours after the sinking, something blamed on misinformation and confusion about the ship's fate; it was not until one man managed to swim to Santo and get help from a local diver that it was finally understood the ship had capsized, something that led to much criticism. Ships assembled in an effort to find survivors, rescuing many of them. Three were rescued by Cayman Islands registered Yacht "Lunaris" 36 hours later. An aerial search was also conducted, 12 were spotted by French Armed Forces aircraft on 13 September. Search efforts eventually turned away from open waters to coastal areas, where survivors may have been pushed by currents. Ambae communities raised VT203,000 as part of search efforts, with funds allocated to fuel for aerial searches. Search efforts were hampered by strong weather, seeing swells up to 3 m (9.8 ft) in height. The search would officially end on the 22nd, with 38 remaining unaccounted for.

== Aftermath ==
The Vanuatu Maritime Safety Authority announced criminal charges of negligence against the owners and captain of the vessel, as the ship had failed to properly register and comply with safety regulations, not being certified to carry passengers.

== Reactions ==
Prime Minister of Vanuatu Jotham Napat's office stated "their hearts and prayers are with the families who have lost loved ones".
