= East Epi (volcano) =

Submarine volcano in Vanuatu

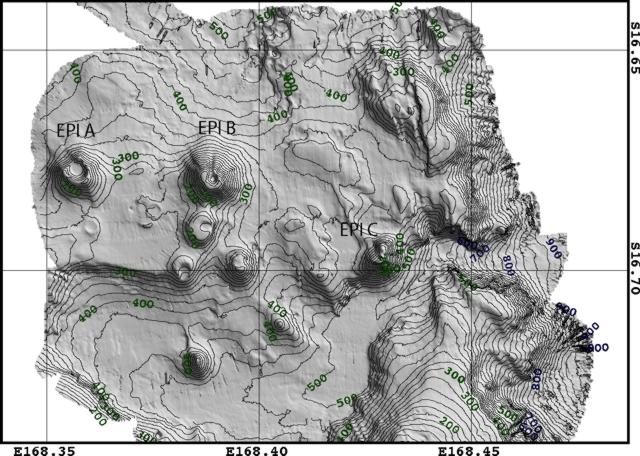
- Shaded relief map of the Epi caldera; Epi-A, Epi-B and Epi-C are marked.
- Summit depth: 34 m (112 ft)

Location
- Location: Vanuatu
- Coordinates: 16°40′48″S 168°22′12″E

Geology
- Type: Caldera, cinder cones
- Last eruption: 2023

East of the Vanuatu island of Epi can be found a series of active underwater volcanic cones and a caldera which last erupted in 2023. These series of submarine volcanoes are generally referred as East Epi, and the 3 bigger cones have specific names, from west to east, Epi-A, Epi-B and Epi-C. All of these cones have had intermittent activity in this and the last century.

== Geography ==
These submarine volcanoes are located approximately 6 km east of Epi Island, 15 km south of Lopevi, an active volcano and 25 km north-northwest of Kuwae, another submarine volcano (caldera) between the islands of Epi and Tongoa.

=== Bathymetry ===
The Epi underwater seamount complex is made up of a possible submarine caldera with 3 bigger cones aligned on the northern rim of the caldera. The Epi-A cone consists of a wide crater at the summit, with the highest point located 124 meter below sea level. Meanwhile, Epi-B has a summit of 34 meters and Epi-C has a highest point of 169 meters below sea level.

=== Rock types ===
In a research done in 1988, basaltic and dacitic products were found emitted from the Epi-A and Epi-B cones.

== Geologic setting ==
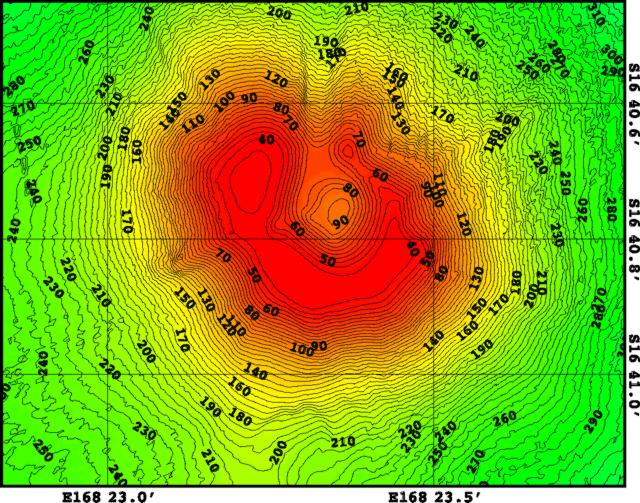
Bathymetry of the Epi-B cone.

The volcanoes are located in New Hebrides Island Arc which includes the Vanuatu Islands, which lie on the convergent plate boundary where the Australian Plate subducts (sinks) beneath the New Hebrides Plate. The subducting crust melts under the high pressure and temperatures which causes the formation of magma underground. The magma rises up onto the surface, which then forms a chain of volcanoes. These volcanoes allow the magma to be released into the air with several types of volcanic products.

== Eruptive history ==
The Epi caldera has eight recorded eruptions over the Holocene period; in order, the volcano erupted in 1920, 1953, 1958, 1960, 1979, 1999, 2002, 2004 and 2023. There were unconfirmed eruptions with questionable certainty in November 1953, 1971, 1972, 1973, 1974 and 1988. The biggest eruption out of all of these was in 1953, when the volcano had an eruption equivalent to 3 in the VEI scale.

=== 1953 eruption ===
One of the cones appeared over the sea level for a short time while big amounts of pumice were erupting from it. Volcanic material was ejected into the air as high as 100 meters above the sea level and rafts of pumice covered an area of around 1,000 km^{2}.

=== 1958 eruption ===
It was the second largest ever recorded in the Epi Caldera with a VEI of 2. This eruption was sourced from the Epi-B cone and the eruption of the pumice causing discolored water was observed from an aircraft.

=== 2004 eruption ===
In early 2004, on 16 February, loud explosion noises were heard from Epi Island residents. Shortly after, a fishing vessel called Azur witnessed and recorded an explosion that breached the surface of the sea. Shortly after, officials were informed about the eruption which prompted them to gather witnesses for the eruption.

The eruption lasted 6 days, and was later revealed that the eruption was caused by the Epi-B cone, similar to most recorded eruptions including 1958. A few months later, this prompted research to be done about the volcano and its characteristics.

=== 2023 eruption ===
On 1 February 2023 (local time), locals on Epi Island reported phreatic explosions out in the sea, east of the island. Later in the day, the VMGD (Vanuatu Meteorology and Geo-Hazards Department) confirmed the eruption at East Epi and acknowledged the explosions and the emission of ash. VMGD also set a 10 km (6 mi)-wide exclusion zone around the volcano and warned nearby residents to avoid sailing in the area. The alert level of the volcano was raised by VMGD to 1 (Signs of Volcanic Unrest) in the Vanuatu Volcanic Alert Level System consisting of 5 levels.
