= COVID-19 pandemic in Vanuatu =

- Disease: COVID-19
- Pathogen: SARS-CoV-2
- Location: Vanuatu
- First outbreak: Wuhan, China
- Index case: Port Vila
- Arrival date: 11 November 2020
- Confirmed cases: 12,019
- Deaths: 14
- Fatality rate: 0.12%
- Vaccinations: 162,250 (fully vaccinated)

Government website
- https://covid19.gov.vu/

The COVID-19 pandemic in Vanuatu was part of the worldwide pandemic of coronavirus disease 2019 (COVID-19) caused by severe acute respiratory syndrome coronavirus 2 (SARS-CoV-2). The virus was confirmed to have reached Vanuatu on 11 November 2020.

== Background ==
On 12 January 2020, the World Health Organization (WHO) confirmed that a novel coronavirus was the cause of a respiratory illness in a cluster of people in Wuhan, Hubei Province, China, which was reported to the WHO on 31 December 2019.

The case fatality ratio for COVID-19 globally has been much lower than the SARS outbreak between 2002 and 2004, but the transmission rates have been substantially greater, with a consequently more significant total death toll.

== Timeline ==
Cases

Deaths

=== 2020 ===
On 16 March 2020, travel restrictions and quarantine measures were put in place for those entering Vanuatu. On 22 March, Vanuatu's health authorities confirmed that tests for a resort worker with a suspected case of coronavirus had returned negative. President Tallis Obed Moses declared a state of emergency in the country on 26 March after a tourist on a cruise ship visiting the island of Aneityum had tested positive for the virus, prompting a lockdown on the island. Blood samples from locals on the island were also sent to New Caledonia for testing.

The first asymptomatic case, that of a man who had traveled to the islands from the United States via Sydney and Auckland was confirmed on 11 November. He had arrived in Vanuatu on 4 November and underwent managed isolation and quarantine with no symptoms, and tested positive on 10 November. On 2 December, it was confirmed that the man had since tested negative.

=== 2021 ===
On 6 March 2021, Prime Minister Bob Loughman announced two new COVID-19 cases, and by 23 March, there were a total of 3 cases, with 2 being active cases and 1 being a recovery. A new positive case was confirmed on 19 April, the body of a Filipino sailor who had been working aboard a British-flagged tanker had washed up on the shores of Port Vila, with the sailor testing positive for COVID-19 post-mortem.

On 19 May, Vanuatu received 24,000 doses of the Oxford–AstraZeneca COVID-19 vaccine.

No new cases were reported in the country until late October, when on 24 October, two people who had arrived in Port Vila from Nouméa, New Caledonia tested positive while in quarantine, two days after their arrival. By the end of 2021, there were 7 total cases in Vanuatu, with no active cases, 6 recoveries, and 1 death.

=== 2022 – 2023 ===
By the end of March 2022, there had been 2,633 cases, with 1,663 active cases, 970 recoveries, and 1 death. By 4 April, there were two new deaths, a 22 year old and a 5 year old, who were the first Ni-Vanuatu citizens to die from COVID-19. The total number of cases crossed over 10,000 on 4 June.

As the COVID-19 situation plateaued globally and governments began lifting restrictions, the Vanuatu government lifted requirements of a negative COVID-19 test as well as vaccination against COVID-19 for incoming travellers on 12 September. By the end of the year, there were a total of 11,982 cases, with 14 deaths.

On 20 April 2023, the official case tally reached 12,005 cases and 14 deaths in Vanuatu, with the majority being in the capital, Port Vila. No new cases or deaths were recorded for the remainder of 2023, with the government stopping to count anymore by 30 January 2024.

== Statistics ==
=== Cases by provinces ===
Positives cases by province (as of 22 June 2022)
Province	Cases	Recovered	Deaths	References
Malampa	64	14	0	
Penama	1,233	1,176	0	
Shefa	5,346	5,338	11	
Sanma	2,317	2,317	3	
Tafea	1,315	1,289	0	
Torba	683	654	0	
6/6	10,956	10,778	14	

== Vaccination ==
On 2 June 2021, Vanuatu launched its COVID-19 vaccine roll-out campaign. On 23 June 2021, President Tallis Obed Moses and First Lady Estella Moses Tallis publicly received their first doses of the Oxford–AstraZeneca COVID-19 vaccine as part of the vaccination campaign.

On 27 July 2021, 20,000 AstraZeneca vaccines were received in Vanuatu through a bilateral arrangement between the governments of the Republic of Vanuatu and Australia, a further 24,000 AstraZeneca doses have been provided by COVAX, and 20,000 Sinopharm BIBP vaccine doses received from the Chinese Government.

The total number of COVID-19 vaccine doses administered between 2 June 2021 and 8 August 2021 was 31,028. Health workers, front line workers (e.g. border workers, quarantine facility staff, public transport drivers), the elderly (55 and over), and 4,314 people aged 35 years and over with known underlying medical conditions were given priority. Those who have received both of the two recommended doses of either Sinopharm or AstraZeneca vaccines are considered fully vaccinated. By 8 August, 1,721 people in Vanuatu were considered fully vaccinated, making up 0.6% of the country's total population.

By 20 March 2022, 75% of Ni-Vanuatu adults had received at least one dose of the COVID-19 vaccine, with 69% of those people being fully vaccinated. By 24 April, that figure had reached 80% of Ni-Vanuatu adults, with 91% of those people being fully vaccinated.

== See also ==
- COVID-19 pandemic in Oceania
