= Port Vato =

Port Vato Langievot
- Village
- Church of Port Vato, with a painting of Rev. George Fleming, the first missionary who died in 1905

- Location in Vanuatu
- Coordinates: 16°19′39″S 168°2′39″E
- Country: Vanuatu
- Province: Malampa Province
- Island: Ambrym
- Elevation: 33 m (108 ft)

Population (2009)
  - Total: 250
- Time zone: UTC+11 (VUT)

Port Vato is a village at the south coast of the island of Ambrym in Vanuatu with about 200 inhabitants as of 2009.

The village has a Presbyterian church and a primary school (French and English), which is shared with the neighboring villages of Lonmei and Lalinda. It can be reached by dirt road from the airfield in Craig Cove. It has two guest houses for visitors. Visits to the volcanoes, Mt. Benbow and Mt. Marum, can be arranged from there.

== Name ==
The name of the village refers to the stone reef visible at low tides at the black sand beach (vato meaning "stone"). In the local language Daakie, the village is called Langievot, meaning "at the end of the stones".
