= 2022 Vanuatuan presidential election =

Election of Nikenike Vurobaravu

2022 Vanuatu presidential election
- 21–23 July 2022
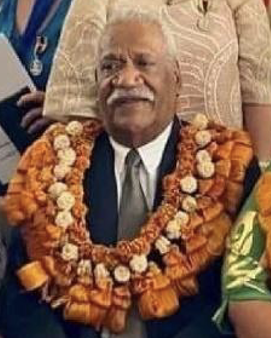

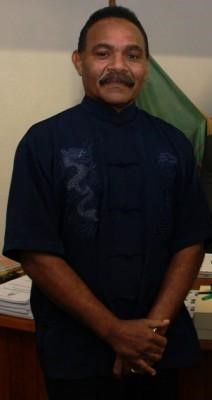
Nominee	Nikenike Vurobaravu	Sela Molisa
Party	Vanua'aku Pati	Vanua'aku Pati
Electoral vote	48	4
Percentage	87.28%	7.28%
Nominee	Jude Naru	George Wells
Party	Independent	People's Progressive
Electoral vote	2	1
Percentage	3.64%	1.82%
President before election
Tallis Obed Moses
Independent
Elected President
Nikenike Vurobaravu
Vanua'aku Pati

The 2022 Vanuatuan presidential election was held between 21–23 July 2022 to indirectly elect the president of Vanuatu.

Incumbent president Tallis Obed Moses was eligible for a second term. The election was won on the eighth round of voting on 23 July by Nikenike Vurobaravu.

== Candidates ==
- Tallis Obed Moses, incumbent president of Vanuatu since 6 July 2017 (b. 1954), Independent
- Nikenike Vurobaravu, Vanuatu high commissioner to Fiji, Vanua'aku Pati
- Edwin Amblus, former member of Parliament (2016–2020), Friend Melanesian Party
- John Korwar Path, former auditor general
- Jacob Bani, Independent
- Willie Jimmy Tapangararua, former member of Parliament (1983–2008, 2012–2016), Vanuatu Liberal Democratic Party
- Andrina Thomas, activist, Leleon Vanua Democratic Party
- Serge Vohor, former Prime Minister (1995–1996, 1996–1998, 2004, 2011), Union of Moderate Parties
- Malao John Vimoli, Independent
- Lois Kwevira Natuhihe Fatu, Independent
- George Andre Wells, former member of Parliament (1995–2016), former Speaker of Parliament (2008–2009, 2010, 2012–2013), People's Progressive Party
- Jude Iath Salro Naru, Independent
- Sela Molisa, former member of Parliament (1982–2012), Vanua'aku Pati

=== Declined ===
- Bob Loughman, Incumbent Prime Minister of Vanuatu since 20 April 2020 (b. 1961), Vanua'aku Pati

== Results ==
=== 21 July rounds ===
Candidate	Party	First round		Second round	
Candidate	Party	Votes	%	Votes	%
Nikenike Vurobaravu	VP	26	47.28	34	59.65
Willie Jimmy Tapangararua	VLDP	6	10.90	4	7.02
Jacob Bani	IND	5	9.10	1	1.75
Sela Molisa	VP	5	9.10	3	5.27
George Wells	PPP	3	5.45	8	14.03
Serge Vohor	UMP	2	3.64	4	7.02
Edwin Amblus	FMP	2	3.64	0	0
Tallis Obed Moses	IND	2	3.64	0	0
Jude Naru	IND	2	3.64	2	3.51
Lois Fatu	IND	1	1.82	0	0
John Path	IND	1	1.82	0	0
Andrina Thomas	LVDP	0	0	1	1.76
Malao John Vimoli	IND	0	0	0	0
Total		55	100	57	100
Valid votes		55	100	57	100
Blank and invalid ballots		0	0	0	0
Total		55	100	57	100
Abstentions		3	5.17	1	1.73
Registered voters / turnout		58	94.83	58	98.27

=== 22 July rounds ===
Candidate	Party	Third round		Fourth round		Fifth round		Sixth round	
Candidate	Party	Votes	%	Votes	%	Votes	%	Votes	%
Nikenike Vurobaravu	VP	35	62.50	35	61.40	35	61.40	36	64.29
Willie Jimmy Tapangararua	VLDP	3	5.36	5	8.77	5	8.77	3	5.36
Jacob Bani	IND	0	0	0	0	0	0	0	0
Sela Molisa	VP	4	7.14	4	7.02	4	7.02	3	5.36
George Wells	PPP	7	12.50	4	7.02	4	7.02	6	10.71
Serge Vohor	UMP	5	8.93	3	5.26	3	5.26	1	1.78
Edwin Amblus	FMP	0	0	3	5.26	3	5.26	5	8.93
Tallis Obed Moses	IND	0	0	0	0	0	0	0	0
Jude Naru	IND	2	3.57	3	5.26	3	5.26	2	3.57
Lois Fatu	IND	0	0	0	0	0	0	0	0
John Path	IND	0	0	0	0	0	0	0	0
Andrina Thomas	LVDP	0	0	0	0	0	0	0	0
Malao John Vimoli	IND	0	0	0	0	0	0	0	0
Total		56	100	57	100	57	100	56	100
Valid votes		56	100	57	100	57	100	56	100
Blank and invalid ballots		0	0	0	0	0	0	0	0
Total		56	100	57	100	57	100	56	100
Abstentions		2	3.45	1	1.73	1	1.73	2	3.45
Registered voters / turnout		58	96.55	58	98.27	58	98.27	58	96.55

=== 23 July rounds ===
Candidate	Party	Seventh round		Eighth round	
Candidate	Party	Votes	%	Votes	%
Nikenike Vurobaravu	VP	37	64.91	48	87.28
Willie Jimmy Tapangararua	VLDP	2	3.51	0	0
Jacob Bani	IND	0	0	0	0
Sela Molisa	VP	10	17.54	4	7.28
George Wells	PPP	4	7.02	1	1.82
Serge Vohor	UMP	1	1.75	0	0
Edwin Amblus	FMP	2	3.51	0	0
Tallis Obed Moses	IND	1	1.75	0	0
Jude Naru	IND	0	0	2	3.64
Lois Fatu	IND	0	0	0	0
John Path	IND	0	0	0	0
Andrina Thomas	LVDP	0	0	0	0
Malao John Vimoli	IND	0	0	0	0
Total		57	100	55	100
Valid votes		57	100	55	100
Blank and invalid ballots		0	0	0	0
Total		57	100	55	100
Abstention		1	1.73	3	5.17
Registered voters / turnout		58	98.27	58	94.83
