= Public holidays in Vanuatu =

This is a list of public holidays in Vanuatu.

== Public holidays ==
Date	English name
January 1	New Year's Day
February 21	Father Walter Lini Day
March 5	Custom Chief's Day
March or April	Good Friday
March or April	Easter Monday
May 1	Labour Day
May or June	Ascension Day
July 24	Children's Day
July 30	Independence Day
August 15	Assumption Day
October 5	Constitution Day
November 29	National Unity Day
December 25	Christmas Day
December 26	Family Day

Certain provincial holidays are also celebrated.
