= Anglo-French Joint Naval Commission =

1887–1906 Anglo-French administration of New Hebrides (modern Vanuatu)

The Anglo-French Joint Naval Commission (JNC; French: Commission Navale Mixte) was a joint authority formed by the British and French governments to protect their subjects and property in the New Hebrides (present-day Vanuatu). It was created in 1888 and consisted of officers of the French Navy and Royal Navy. Its role declined after a formal condominium structure was created in 1906, although it was not formally disestablished until 1928.

== Background ==
European settlement in the New Hebrides increased in the second half of the 19th century, primarily consisting of British subjects from the Australian colonies and French subjects from New Caledonia. In 1877, British subjects in the New Hebrides were placed under the authority of the Western Pacific High Commission in Fiji. The following year the British and French governments reached an "arrangement" to respect the islands' independence, making it a form of neutral territory. However, settlers were unsatisfied with the lack of a governing authority and continued to lobby their respective governments to protect their interests and provide a method of settling land disputes.

== Creation and provisions ==
On 16 November 1887, the British and French governments agreed the Convention between Great Britain and France Respecting Abrogation of the Declaration of the 19th June, 1847, relative to the Islands to the Leeward of Tahiti, and for the Protection of Life and Property in the New Hebrides. The Joint Naval Commission envisioned by the convention of 1887 was formally established on 26 January 1888 by the Declaration between Britain and France for the Constitution of a Joint Naval Commission for the Protection of Life and Property in the New Hebrides.

The JNC was "charged with the duty of maintaining and protecting the lives and property of British subjects and French citizens in the New Hebrides". It was supposed to consist of two officers from a British warship and two officers from a French warship, with the captains of each ship alternating as president of the commission. However, in practice each navy's ships were rarely in the same location at the same time and there were significant logistic challenges in agreeing joint actions, leading to a number of instances of unilaterality.

== Operations ==
In 1906, another Anglo-French convention was agreed establishing a form of condominium over the New Hebrides, including the creation of the Joint Court of the New Hebrides to exercise judicial authority in the territory. The convention of 1906 did not disestablish the Joint Naval Commission, but provided that it would be reassembled and intervene "in the event of a disturbance of peace and good order in any part of the New Hebrides where British or French subjects may be settled, or in the case of danger menacing the safety of life or property".

=== Quasi-judicial role ===
The JNC was "was the only form of limited jurisdiction over the New Hebrides" between 1887 and 1907. However, the convention of 1887 prohibited the commission from interfering in land disputes, which remained an ongoing source of dissatisfaction for settlers. The JNC assumed quasi-judicial status, issuing fines and imposing sentences of corporal punishment (including flogging) and imprisonment. British subjects were also forcibly deported to Fiji.

Private lawyers were banned from JNC hearings and defendants were not allowed to call witnesses. The convention of 1906 had created the role of "native advocate" to protect the rights of New Hebrideans, but the advocate was also banned from proceedings. In 1913, the French ship Kersaint intervened to arrest New Hebrideans who had been raising funds to hire a lawyer to sue French settlers.

=== Punitive expeditions ===
The JNC conducted regular punitive expeditions against New Hebrideans for alleged crimes, including violence or threats of violence against European traders and settlers. Land-based expeditions were mounted against villages to arrest or punish alleged criminals, while some villages were also shelled by warships for sheltering wanted men.

== Disestablishment ==
The near-plenary power of the JNC had been limited by 1920 although it was not formally abolished until 1928 when a Native Code and system of Native Courts were established.

== Sources ==
- Rechniewski, Emily (2025). "The Experiment and Experience of Co-Imperialism in the New Hebrides, 1870s–1920s". The Journal of Pacific History. 60 (4): 473–495. doi:10.1080/00223344.2025.2579061.
- Scarr, Deryck (1967). Fragments of Empire: A History of the Western Pacific High Commission, 1877–1914. ANU Press. ISBN 9780708106846.
- Stevens, Kate (2022). Gender, Violence and Criminal Justice in the Colonial Pacific. Bloomsbury Academic. ISBN 9781350275539.
