= Tallis Obed Moses =

President of Vanuatu from 2017 to 2022

His Excellency Tallis Obed Moses
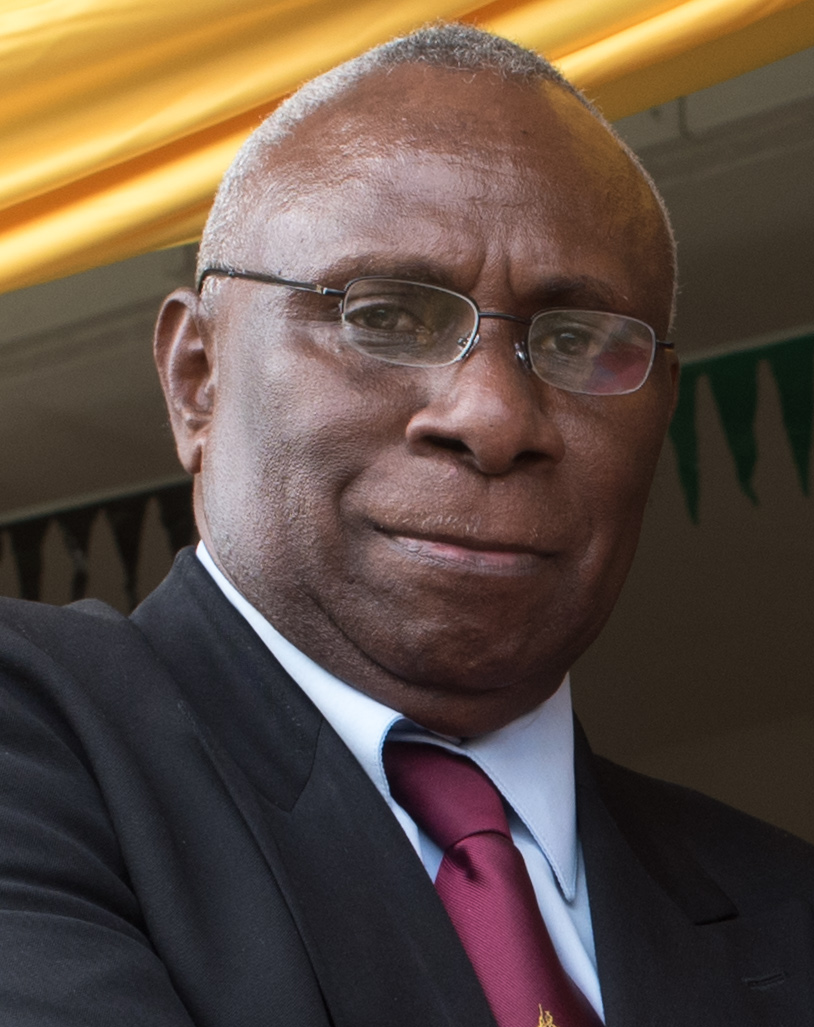
- Moses in July 2017

9th President of Vanuatu
- In office 6 July 2017 – 6 July 2022
- Prime Minister: Charlot Salwai; Bob Loughman
- Preceded by: Baldwin Lonsdale; Esmon Saimon (acting)
- Succeeded by: Seule Simeon (acting); Nikenike Vurobaravu

Personal details
- Born: 24 October 1954 (age 72) Port Vato, West Ambrym, New Hebrides (present day Vanuatu)
- Party: Independent
- Spouse: Estella Moses Tallis
- Education: Sydney Missionary and Bible College

Tallis Obed Moses (born 24 October 1954) is a Vanuatuan politician and pastor who served as the president of Vanuatu from 6 July 2017 to 6 July 2022.

== Biography ==
Moses was originally from Port Vato, West Ambrym. He attended Primary School from 1964 to 1967. He later worked for the Teaching Service as a teacher in various schools, before attending the Tangoa Presbyterian Bible Institute in South Santo in 1978. He studied at the Sydney Missionary and Bible College in Australia from 1980 to 1981 and graduated with Diploma in Divinity and Mission. He later studied at Talua Ministry Training Centre between 1985 and 1986, graduating with a Diploma in Theology. He went back to Australia in 1989 and studied at the Alan Walker College of Evangelism, where he graduated in 1989 with Certificate of Merit.

Moses also served as a pastor at Erromango, Ranon in North Ambrym, Luganville and Bamefau. In 2009 and again in 2013, he was elected moderator of the Presbyterian Church of Vanuatu after he received religious training and education in Australia and Papua New Guinea.

On 6 July 2017 he was elected to succeed President Baldwin Lonsdale who had died in office. He was chosen among 16 candidates after four rounds of voting (received 40 votes out of 57 from the Electoral College) and sworn in immediately after.

Political offices
Preceded by Esmon Saimon; Acting	President of Vanuatu; 2017–2022	Succeeded by Seoule Simeon; Acting
