= History of Vanuatu =

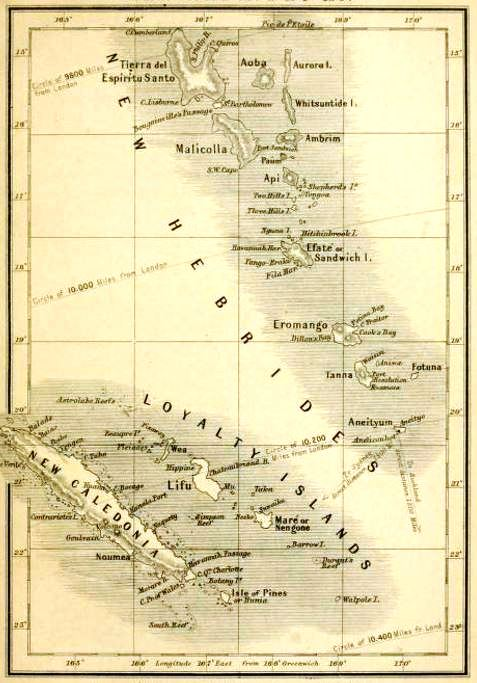
Early map of the New Hebrides, 1887

The history of Vanuatu spans over 3,000 years.

Vanuatu was discovered by Austronesians of the Lapita culture 3,000 years ago. Vanuatu first had contact with Europeans in 1606, when Pedro Fernandes de Queirós, a Portuguese explorer sailing for the Spanish crown, came to the island. The Spanish established a short-lived settlement at Big Bay. In 1768, Louis Antoine de Bougainville, a French explorer and military officer visited the island. Later, Captain Cook visited the islands and gave it the name New Hebrides, a name that lasted until independence.

During the 19th century, the islands were used to obtain indentured labors in the practice called Blackbirding. This caused Vanuatu to lose half of its male population at the time. Missionaries came to the islands to convert the population to Christians while settlers established plantations of cotton and other plants on the island.

Vanuatu (then New Hebrides) came under a British-French condominium in 1887. The condominium had two separate governing systems that only had a joint court. Starting in 1921, the French let Annamese workers (that is, those from Central Vietnam) to the islands in five-year contracts. During the Second World War, approximately 10,000 Ni-Vanuatu men served in the Vanuatu Labor Corps, a labor battalion of the United States Armed Forces at Espiritu Santo Naval Base. They provided logistical support to the Allied war effort during the Guadalcanal campaign.

The first political party of Vanuatu was established in the early 1970s and was called the New Hebrides National Party (now called "Vanua'aku Pati"), founded by Walter Lini. The party pushed for the independence of Vanuatu. In 1979, foreign owners were dispossessed of their land and compensated, and a date for independence was also set. Significant rebellions occurred on Tanna as plans by the French to make Espiritu Santo become a separate colony were revealed.

Beginning in June 1980, Jimmy Stevens, head of the Nagriamel movement, led an uprising against the local colonial officials, which lasted about twelve weeks. The uprising declared the independence of the island of Espiritu Santo as the State of Vemerana. Stevens was supported by Francophone landowners and the Phoenix Foundation. On 8 June 1980, the New Hebrides government asked Britain and France to send troops to suppress the rebellion in Espiritu Santo. However, France refused to allow the UK to deploy troops there, and French troops stationed there took no actions. Walter Lini asked Papua New Guinea to intervene in Vanuatu. As Papua New Guinea sent troops to Espiritu Santo, the foreign press began referring to the conflict as the Coconut War. However, it was brief and ended as a vehicle carrying Steven's son burst through a Papua New Guinean roadblock causing the soldiers to shoot fire on the vehicle, killing Stevens' son. Shortly afterwards, Jimmy Stevens surrendered.

On 30 July 1980, amidst the brief Coconut War, the Republic of Vanuatu was created. During the 1990s, Vanuatu briefly experienced political instability. The Vanuatu Mobile Force, a paramilitary force, attempted a coup in 1996. New elections have been held since 1997, most recently in 2022.

== Premodern history ==
The pre-European history of Vanuatu can be reconstructed by combining insights from linguistics (particularly historical linguistics), anthropology, archaeology and human genetics.

Archaeological evidence supports that peoples speaking Austronesian languages first came to the islands some 3,000 years ago. Pottery fragments have been found dating back to 1300 BC.

The first inhabitants of Vanuatu were carriers of the Lapita culture, speakers of the Proto Oceanic language. That first wave of migration was likely followed, about 500 BC, by a second wave of Melanesian populations.

Around the 16th or 17th century AD, the last chief with the title Roi Mata, died in central Vanuatu. He was buried in a large mound with several retainers – a place which is now one of the UNESCO World Heritage Sites. The memory of Roi Mata is still told today in oral histories and legends.

== European contact ==
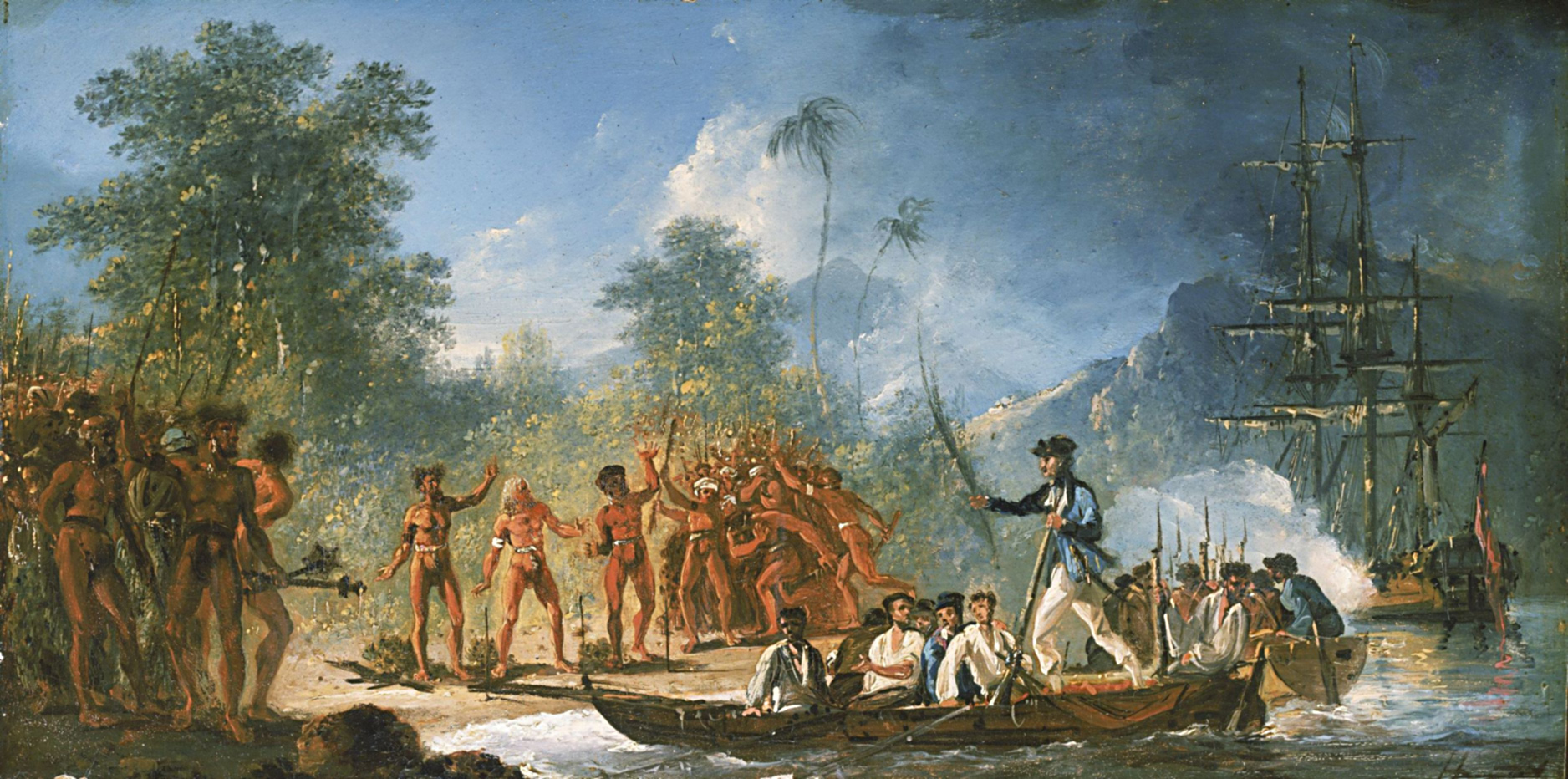
James Cook landing at Tanna island, c. 1774

The Vanuatu group of islands first had contact with Europeans in 1606, when the Portuguese explorer Pedro Fernandes de Queirós, sailing for the Spanish Crown, arrived on the largest island and called the group of islands La Austrialia del Espiritu Santo or "The Southern Land of the Holy Spirit", believing he had arrived in Terra Australis or Australia. The Spanish established a short-lived settlement at Big Bay on the north side of the island. The name Espiritu Santo remains to this day.

Europeans did not return until 1768, when Louis Antoine de Bougainville visited the islands, naming them the Great Cyclades. In 1774, Captain Cook named the islands the New Hebrides, a name that lasted until independence.

In 1825, trader Peter Dillon's discovery of sandalwood on the island of Erromango began a rush that ended in 1830 after a clash between immigrant Polynesian workers and indigenous Melanesians. During the 1860s, planters in Australia, Fiji, New Caledonia, and the Samoan Islands, in need of labourers, orchestrated a long-term indentured labour trade known as "blackbirding". At the height of the blackbirding, more than one-half the adult male population of several of the islands worked abroad. Fragmentary evidence indicates that the current population of Vanuatu is greatly reduced compared to pre-contact times.

It was at this time that missionaries, both Roman Catholic and Protestant, arrived on the islands. For example, John Geddie, a Scots-Canadian presbyterian missionary, arrived at the island of Aneityum in 1848; he spent the rest of his life there, working to convert the inhabitants to Christianity and western ways. John Gibson Paton was a Scottish missionary who devoted his life to the region.

Settlers also came, looking for land on which to establish cotton plantations. When international cotton prices collapsed, they switched to coffee, cocoa, bananas, and, most successfully, coconuts. Initially, British subjects from Australia made up the majority, but the establishment of the Compagnie Caledonienne des Nouvelles Hebrides (Caledonian Company of the New Hebrides) by John Higginson in 1882 soon tipped the balance in favour of French subjects. By around the start of the 20th century, the French outnumbered the British two to one.

== Franceville ==
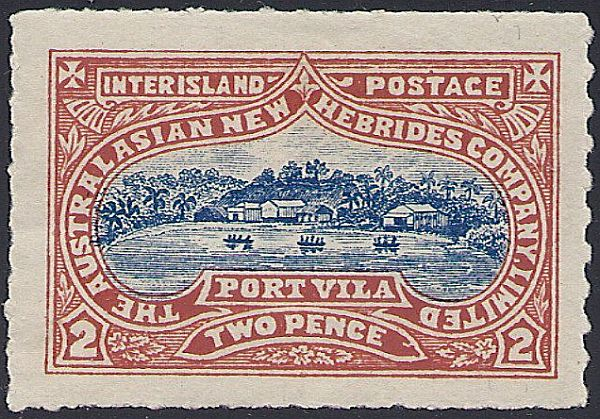
1897 stamp of the Australasian New Hebrides Company, providing shipping and other services - including mail delivery - on steamers running between Australia and the New Hebrides, at intervals of about three weeks.

The municipality of Franceville (present-day Port Vila) on Efate was established during this period. In 1878 Britain and France declared all of the New Hebrides to be neutral territory, but the lack of a functional government led to rising discontent among British and French colonists. The French were especially inconvenienced because French law recognized marriages only when contracted under a civil authority (the nearest being in New Caledonia), whereas British law recognized marriages conducted by local clergy (the nearest being in Fiji). In 1887 both nations created an Anglo-French Joint Naval Commission to defend their citizens. On 9 August 1889, Franceville declared itself independent under the leadership of mayor/president Ferdinand Chevillard and with its own red, white and blue flag with five stars. This community became the first self-governing nation to practice universal suffrage without distinction of sex or race. Although the district's population at the time consisted of about 500 natives and fewer than 50 whites, only the latter were permitted to hold office. One of its elected presidents was a U.S. citizen by birth, R. D. Polk.

== Condominium ==
1966 flag of the colonial Anglo-French New Hebrides

The jumbling of French and British interests in the islands brought petitions for one or another of the two powers to annex the territory. The Convention of 16 October 1887 established a joint naval commission for the sole purpose of protecting French and British citizens, but claimed no jurisdiction over internal native affairs.

In 1906, however, France and the United Kingdom agreed to administer the islands jointly. Called the British-French Condominium, it was a unique form of government, with separate governmental systems that came together only in a joint court. The resident commissioners of each government established administrations in Port Vila. The British resident commissioner was subordinate to the High Commissioner for the Western Pacific (based initially in Suva and later in Honiara) and the French resident commissioner was subordinate to the High Commissioner of the Republic in New Caledonia. The condominium's authority was extended in the Anglo-French Protocol of 1914, although this was not formally ratified until 1922. Melanesians were barred from acquiring the citizenship of either power and were officially stateless; to travel abroad they needed an identity document signed by both the British and French resident commissioners.

Starting in 1921, French plantation owners let Annamese workers from the Gulf of Tonkin come to the New Hebrides under 5 years contracts. They were 437 in 1923, 5413 in 1930, then after the crisis 1630 in 1937. There was some social and political unrest among them in 1947. In 1949 the plantation owners wished to replace Annamese by "more docile" Javanese. However, a French scholar suggested in 1950 a renewal of Annamese migration, but this time as settlers in villages of their own. A proposal because "It is difficult, indeed, to count on the natives. They live (...) a still wild life".

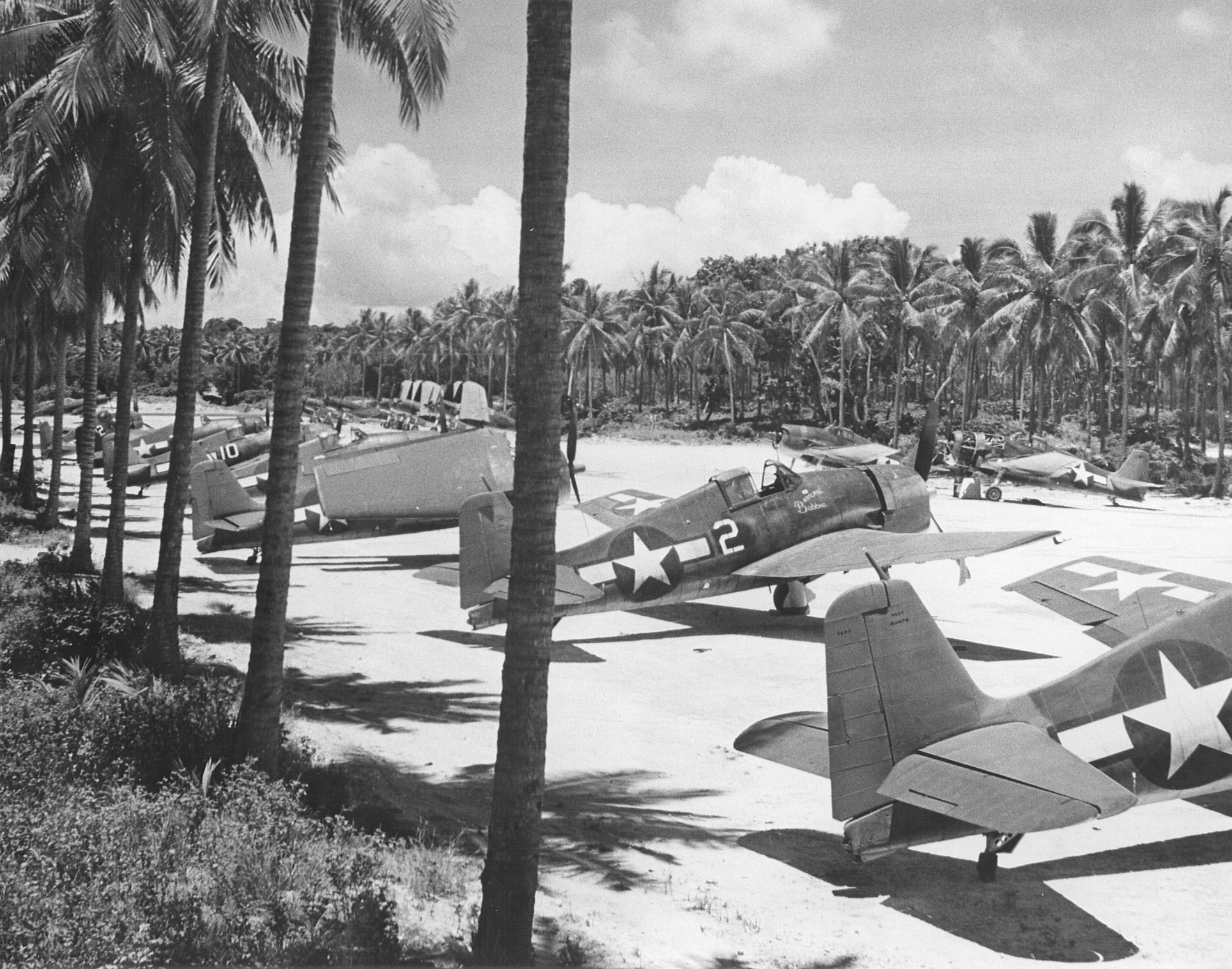
US Navy Hellcats on Espiritu Santo island in February 1944

Challenges to this form of government began in the early 1940s. During the Second World War, approximately 10,000 Ni-Vanuatu men served in the Vanuatu Labor Corps, a labor battalion of the United States Armed Forces at Espiritu Santo Naval Base. They provided logistical support to the Allied war effort during the Guadalcanal campaign. The mass participation of Ni-Vanuatu men in the Labor Corps had a significant effect on the John Frum movement, giving it the characteristics of a cargo cult. Today, John Frum is both a religion and a political party with a member in Parliament.

== Decolonisation ==
The final political impetus towards independence was the central issue of land ownership which arose during the 1960s. The ancient customs of the Ni-Vanuatu meant that land was held in trust for future generations by the current custodians; Europeans viewed it more as a commodity and owned about 30% of the land area. This European-held land had been mostly cleared for coconut production, but when they began clearing more land for coconut production, protests began in both Santo and Malekula led by Jimmy Stevens and his kastom movement called "Nagriamel".

In the 1960s, France opposed Britain's desire to de-colonize the New Hebrides, fearing that the independence sentiment would be contagious in their mineral-rich colonial possessions in French New Caledonia.

The first political party was established in the early 1970s and originally was called the New Hebrides National Party. One of the founders was Walter Lini, an Anglican Priest, who later became prime minister. Renamed the Vanua'aku Party in 1974, the party pushed for independence. The New Hebrides Representative Assembly was created in 1975 but dissolved in 1977 after demands for the elimination of government-appointees and immediate independence. In 1979 foreign owners were dispossessed and received compensation from their own governments and a date was set for full independence. Significant rebellions occurred on Tanna and Espiritu Santo.

== The Coconut War ==
Nagriamel flag

Beginning in June 1980, Jimmy Stevens, head of the Nagriamel movement, led an uprising against the colonial officials and the plans for independence. The uprising lasted about 12 weeks. The rebels blockaded Santo-Pekoa International Airport, destroyed two bridges, and declared the independence of Espiritu Santo island as the "State of Vemerana". Stevens was supported by French-speaking landowners and by the Phoenix Foundation, an American business foundation that supported the establishment of a libertarian tax haven in the New Hebrides.

On 8 June 1980, the New Hebrides government asked Britain and France to send troops to put down a rebellion on the island of Espiritu Santo. France refused to allow the United Kingdom to deploy troops to defuse the crisis, and French soldiers stationed on Espiritu Santo took no action. As independence day neared, the Prime Minister-elect, Walter Lini, asked Papua New Guinea if it would send troops to intervene. As Papua New Guinean soldiers began arriving in Espiritu Santo, the foreign press began referring to the ongoing events as the "Coconut War".

However, the "war" was brief and unconventional. The residents of Espiritu Santo generally welcomed the Papua New Guineans as fellow Melanesians. Stevens' followers were armed with only bows and arrows, rocks, and slings. There were few casualties, and the war came to a sudden end: when a vehicle carrying Stevens' son burst through a Papua New Guinean roadblock in late August 1980, the soldiers opened fire on the vehicle, killing Stevens' son. Shortly thereafter, Jimmy Stevens surrendered, stating that he had never intended that anyone be harmed.

At Stevens' trial, the support of the Phoenix Foundation to the Nagriamel movement was revealed. It was also revealed that the French government had secretly supported Stevens in his efforts. Stevens was sentenced to 14 years' imprisonment; he remained in prison until 1991.

== Independence of Vanuatu ==
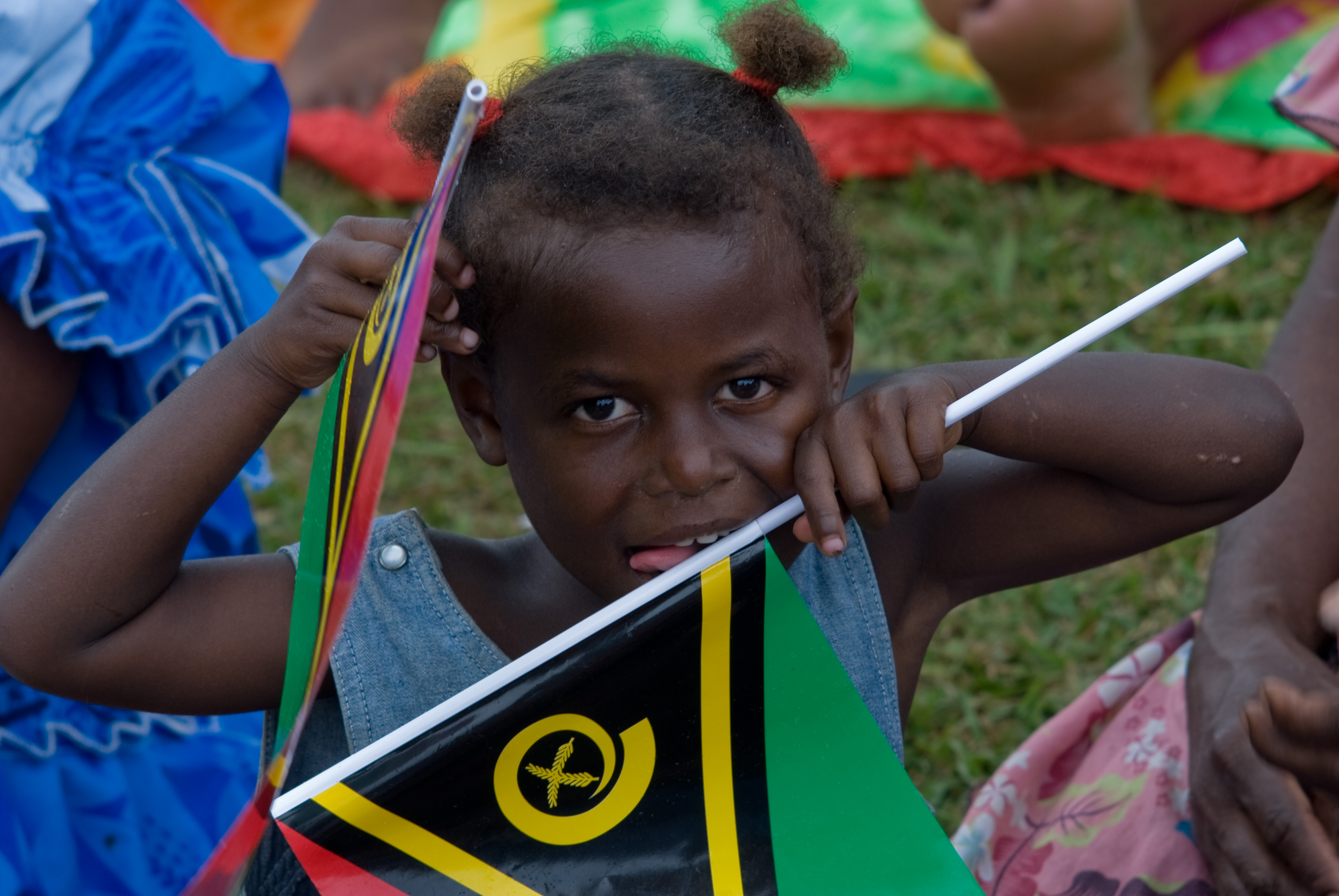
Vanuatu independence day, 2010

On 30 July 1980, amidst the brief Coconut War, the Republic of Vanuatu was created.

Since independence, only kastom owners and the government can own land; foreigners and other islanders who are not kastom owners can lease land only for the productive life of a coconut palm - 75 years.

During the 1990s, Vanuatu experienced a period of political instability which resulted in a more decentralised government. The Vanuatu Mobile Force, a paramilitary group, attempted a coup in 1996 because of a pay dispute. There were allegations of corruption in the government of Maxime Carlot Korman. New elections have been held several times since 1997, most recently in 2022.

== See also ==
- Condominium (international law)
- Franceville, New Hebrides
- New Hebrides

== Bibliography ==
- Lindstrom, Lamont (1991). "Remembering the Pacific War". Occasional Papers of the Center for Pacific Islands Studies. Center for Pacific Studies: 47–59. ISSN 0897-8905.
