= Nikenike Vurobaravu =

President of Vanuatu since 2022

His Excellency Nikenike Vurobaravu
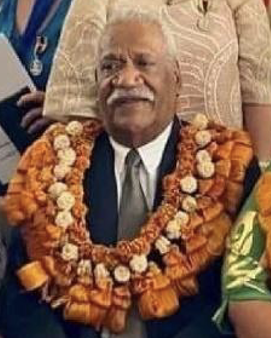
- Vurobaravu in 2022

10th President of Vanuatu
- Incumbent
- Assumed office 23 July 2022
- Prime Minister: Bob Loughman; Ishmael Kalsakau; Sato Kilman; Charlot Salwai; Jotham Napat
- Preceded by: Tallis Obed Moses; Seoule Simeon (acting)

High Commissioner of Vanuatu to Fiji
- In office 12 October 2017 – 23 July 2022
- Succeeded by: Viranria Brown
- In office 2014–2015

Personal details
- Born: 3 December 1951 (age 74) New Hebrides (now Vanuatu)
- Party: Vanua'aku Pati
- Spouse: Rima Vurobaravu
- Children: Four
- Education: University of the South Pacific (BA); University of Westminster (MA)

Nikenike Vurobaravu (born 3 December 1951) is a ni-Vanuatu diplomat and politician who has served as President of Vanuatu since 23 July 2022. Previously having been employed in numerous diplomatic and government positions, including as the first resident High Commissioner to Fiji, he was elected as president during the eighth round of the 2022 Vanuatuan presidential election in July 2022. He is a member of the Vanua'aku Pati (VP) political party.

== Biography ==
Vurobaravu is married to Rima Vurobaravu, from Malo island, Sanma Province, with whom he has four children.

He received a Bachelor of Arts degree from the University of the South Pacific (USP) in Fiji in 1977. Vurobaravu also obtained his Master of Arts degree in diplomatic studies from the University of Westminster in the United Kingdom in 1993. He specialized in development cooperation, foreign policy analysis, and the management of diplomatic missions while studying at the University of Westminster.

Vurobaravu served as the coordinator of the Vanuatu Comprehensive Reform Program for the Asian Development Bank. He also served as a political adviser in the Prime Minister's Office from 2008 to 2010.

In February 2014, Vurobaravu was appointed as High Commissioner of Vanuatu to Fiji, becoming the country's first-ever resident High Commissioner to reside in Suva in history. However, he was recalled to Vanuatu by the then-government in 2015. On 12 October 2017, President Tallis Obed Moses appointed Vurobaravu to a second term as High Commissioner to Fiji. Vurobaravu presented his credentials to Fijian President Jioji Konrote on 14 November 2017.

== Presidency (2022–present) ==
At the eighth round of voting in the 2022 Vanuatuan presidential election, parliament elected Vurobaravu, the country's 12th president, earning 47 out of 58 electoral votes. The previous seven rounds saw no candidate gain a majority of votes; however, Vurobaravu negotiated with nine members of former prime minister Charlot Salwai's coalition party, who agreed to support him, thus enabling Vurobaravu to win the presidency.

On 18 August 2022, Vurobaravu dissolved parliament midway through the parliamentary term at the request of prime minister Bob Loughman, who advised the dissolution to avoid a no confidence vote. The motion sparked criticism from the opposition, and opposition leader Ralph Regenvanu announced that the opposing parties would contest the dissolution in court. A snap election was subsequently held.

Political offices
| Preceded by Seoule Simeon; Acting | President of Vanuatu; 2022–present | Incumbent |
