= Cabinet of Vanuatu =

Executive branch of Vanuatu

The Cabinet of Vanuatu (formally the Council of Ministers of Vanuatu) is the cabinet (executive branch) of the government of the Republic of Vanuatu.

The Constitution of Vanuatu (Art. 39(1)) specifies that "[t]he executive power of the people of the Republic of Vanuatu is vested in the Prime Minister and Council of Ministers". The number of Ministers must not "exceed a quarter of the number of members of Parliament" (Art. 40(2)). The prime minister, who is directly elected by Parliament, appoints other ministers from among the members of Parliament (Art. 42(1)). The council is "collectively responsible to Parliament" (Art. 43(1)).

== Current cabinet (October 2023–present) ==
Portfolio	Member	Party
Prime Minister	Charlot Salwai	Reunification Movement for Change

== Past cabinets ==
=== Natapei Cabinet, 2008–10 ===
This Cabinet resulted initially from the September 2008 general election. The following month, the council was reshuffled to offer positions to the Union of Moderate Parties (UMP), which joined the ruling coalition. In June 2009, the election to Parliament of Bakoa Kaltongga (the Minister for Foreign Affairs) was invalidated by the Supreme Court, leading to his dismissal from the Council of Ministers. On that occasion, Prime Minister Edward Natapei reshuffled his Cabinet again. In December 2009, a new reshuffle produced the following Cabinet:

Portfolio	Minister	Party	Constituency
Prime Minister; Minister of Public Service	Edward Natapei	Vanua'aku Pati	Port Vila
Deputy Prime Minister; Minister of Trades, Commerce and Industry	Sato Kilman	People's Progress Party	Malekula
Minister of Justice and Women's Affairs	Bakoa Kaltonga	Vanua'aku Pati	Efate
Minister of Finance and Economic Management	Sela Molisa	Vanua'aku Pati	Santo
Minister of Lands and Natural Resources	Paul Telukluk	Namangi Aute	Malekula
Minister of Internal Affairs, Minister of Labour	Moana Carcasses Kalosil	Green	Port Vila
Minister of Infrastructure and Public Utilities	Serge Vohor	Union of Moderate Parties	Santo
Minister of Education	Charlot Salwai	Union of Moderate Parties	Pentecost
Minister of Health	Moses Kahu	Vanua'aku Pati	Tanna
Minister of Foreign Affairs, External Trade and Telecommunications	Joe Natuman	Vanua'aku Pati	Tanna
Minister of Agriculture	Steven Kalsakau	Union of Moderate Parties	Efate
Minister of Ni-Vanuatu Business	Dunstan Hilton	People's Progress Party	Banks & Torres
Minister of Sports and Youth Development	Raphael Worwor	Union of Moderate Parties	Ambrym

=== Kilman Cabinet, 2010–11 ===
On 2 December 2010, Edward Natapei's government was ousted in a vote of no confidence, and Parliament elected Sato Kilman to replace him. Kilman's initial appointments to his Cabinet are given below.

A few days later, a reshuffle took place when members of the Union of Moderate Parties accepted positions in Cabinet in exchange for withdrawing their support from an immediate motion of no confidence in the new government. Charlot Salwai, vice-president of the UMP, replaced Yoan Simon as Minister for Education; and Serge Vohor, President of the UMP, replaced Harry Iauko (a dissident member of the Vanua'aku Pati) as Minister for Infrastructure and Public Utilities. Simon became Minister for Justice, replacing Alfred Carlot, who lost his seat in Cabinet, while Iauko became Minister for Lands and Natural Resources, replacing Paul Telukluk (the only Namangi Aute MP), who was also removed from Cabinet.

On 10 February 2011, Vohor and Salwai both resigned, along with Minister for Agriculture Marcellino Pipite, of the Republican Party; all three wished to protest over their respective parties having fewer seats in Cabinet then they had asked for. (The Republican Party had lost one when Carlot was removed in the reshuffle.) Following Vohor and Salwai's resignation from the government, the UMP announced it was joining the opposition once again, supporting Edward Natapei in his bid to reclaim the premiership by ousting Kilman in a new motion of "no confidence".

On 18 February, there was another reshuffle, to consolidate the government's majority prior to an expected vote on a motion of confidence in Parliament. Backbencher Esmon Sae was appointed Minister for ni-Vanuatu business, replacing Ralph Regenvanu, who became instead Minister for Lands. Backbencher James Wango was appointed Minister for Agriculture, while Marcellino Pipite, who had rejoined the government, was appointed Minister for Education.

On 10 March, Kilman sacked Justice Minister Yoan Simon, who had "reportedly backed the opposition's plans for a motion of no confidence". To shore up the coalition, the Republican Party was invited to join the government once more. The Republican Party demanded the Lands Ministry, which Kilman consequently offered to Alfred Carlot. This meant reshuffling Lands Minister Ralph Regenvanu to the Ministry of Justice and Social Affairs.

Initial Kilman Cabinet
Portfolio	Minister	Party	Constituency
Prime Minister	Sato Kilman	People's Progress Party	Malekula
Deputy Prime Minister; Minister of Trade, Commerce, Industries and Tourism	Ham Lini	National United Party	Pentecost
Minister of Agriculture, Forestry, Quarantine and Fisheries	Marcellino Pipite	Republican Party	Santo
Minister of Cooperatives and Ni-Vanuatu Business Development	Ralph Regenvanu	Land and Justice Party	Port Vila
Minister of Education	Yoanne Simon	Labour Party	Epi
Minister of Finance and Economic Management	Moana Carcasses Kalosil	Green	Port Vila
Minister of Foreign Affairs and External Trade	George Wells	National United Party	Luganville
Minister of Health	Don Ken	Independent	Malekula
Minister of Infrastructure and Public Utilities	Harry Iauko	Vanua'aku Pati (dissident)	Tanna
Minister of Internal Affairs	Dunstan Hilton	People's Progress Party	Banks/Torres
Minister of Justice	Alfred Carlot	Republican Party	Efate
Minister of Lands and Natural Resources	Paul Telukluk	Namangi Aute	Malekula
Minister of Youth and Sports	Morkin Stevens	National United Party	Tanna

Cabinet after final reshuffle, March 2011
Portfolio	Minister	Party	Constituency
Prime Minister	Sato Kilman	People's Progress Party	Malekula
Deputy Prime Minister; Minister of Trade, Commerce, Industries and Tourism	Ham Lini	National United Party	Pentecost
Minister of Agriculture, Forestry, Quarantine and Fisheries	James Wango	People's Progress Party	Ambae
Minister of Cooperatives and Ni-Vanuatu Business Development	Esmon Sae	Melanesian Progressive Party	Malekula
Minister of Education	Marcellino Pipite	Republican Party	Santo
Minister of Finance and Economic Management	Moana Carcasses Kalosil	Green	Port Vila
Minister of Foreign Affairs and External Trade	George Wells	National United Party	Luganville
Minister of Health	Don Ken	Independent	Malekula
Minister of Infrastructure and Public Utilities	Harry Iauko	Vanua'aku Pati (dissident)	Tanna
Minister of Internal Affairs	Dunstan Hilton	People's Progress Party	Banks/Torres
Minister of Justice and Social Affairs	Ralph Regenvanu	Land and Justice Party	Port Vila
Minister of Lands and Natural Resources	Alfred Carlot	Republican Party	Efate
Minister of Youth and Sports	Morkin Stevens	National United Party	Tanna

=== Vohor Cabinet, April–May 2011 ===
On 24 April 2011 (Easter Sunday), Parliament ousted Prime Minister Sato Kilman by twenty-six votes to twenty-five in a motion of no confidence. The Opposition had not formally proposed a candidate to replace him, and Parliament elected Serge Vohor (Union of Moderate Parties) as new prime minister. It was Vohor's fourth accession to the premiership. He quickly named his new Cabinet (detailed below). Other than Vohor himself, it included only one minister from the Union of Moderate Parties (Charlot Salwai, who was given the Education portfolio), whereas the Vanua'aku Pati received four ministries. Eta Rory, the only woman in Parliament, was appointed Minister for Agriculture.

However, Serge Vohor's election as prime minister, and therefore both his term in office and the tenure of his Cabinet, was voided by the Court of Appeal on 13 May. The Court deemed that his election was unconstitutional as he had only received votes from one-half of the members of Parliament (26 out of 52), rather than by an absolute majority.

Portfolio	Minister	Party	Constituency
Prime Minister	Serge Vohor	Union of Moderate Parties	Santo
Deputy Prime Minister	Joshua Kalsakau	Labour Party	Efate
Minister for Foreign Affairs	Joe Natuman	Vanua'aku Pati	Tanna
Minister for Trade	Sela Molisa	Vanua'aku Pati	Santo
Minister for Agriculture	Eta Rory	Family First Party	Malekula
Minister of Finance	Bakoa Kaltongga	Vanua'aku Pati	Efate
Minister for Health	Willie Reuben Abel	Vanua'aku Pati	Tongoa
Minister for Lands	Dominique Morin	Republican Party	Luganville
Minister for Internal Affairs	Patrick Crowby	National United Party	Port Vila
Minister for Education	Charlot Salwai	Union of Moderate Parties	Pentecost
Minister for Justice	Ioan Simon	Labour Party	Epi
Minister for Ni-Vanuatu Business	Paul Telukluk	Namangi Aute	Malekula
Minister for Sports	Thomas Isom	National United Party	Banks/Torres

=== Kilman Cabinet, May–June 2011 ===
Following the voiding of Serge Vohor's brief premiership by the Court of Appeal on 13 May, the premiership reverted to its previous holder: Sato Kilman. Ralph Regenvanu stated that the ousted Kilman Cabinet was thereby fully restored: "Sato and his ministers remain the cabinet of Vanuatu and have always been. [...] [W]e have now taken back our offices." Kilman's restored government, however, was supported only by twenty-four Members of Parliament, while Vohor was believed to have the support of twenty-seven, leaving Kilman's coalition in a precarious position.

Over the following days, the government's side was somewhat strengthened as two members of Parliament defected from the Opposition, and were given Cabinet portfolios. Stephen Kalsakau (of Vohor's Union of Moderate Parties) switched sides a day after the Kilman government was restored, and was appointed Minister for Lands. On 17 May, Willie Reuben Abel joined the government as Minister for Health, replacing Don Ken, who was reshuffled to the ministry of ni-Vanuatu affairs. Willie Reuben Abel was a member of the Vanua'aku Pati, but did not recognise the party's leadership, choosing instead to follow dissident leader Harry Iauko. This 17 May Cabinet lasted until the Kilman premiership was voided the following month.

On 20 May, the government weathered a motion of no confidence, emerging with the support of 27 MPs—a majority of one. Kilman noted the potential for more instability if floor-crossing were to occur, adding that in that case, "we cannot have instability for the next twelve months, [so] it w[ould] be in the interest of the country to go back to elections, as soon as possible".

Kilman's term was also voided by a ruling from Chief Justice Vincent Lunabek on 16 June, finding that Kilman's election in December 2010 had not been in conformity with the requirements for a secret parliamentary ballot set out in Article 41 of the Constitution. Natapei was restored with instructions from the court to convene Parliament for the election of a prime minister.

Cabinet following reshuffle on 17 May
Portfolio	Minister	Party	Constituency
Prime Minister	Sato Kilman	People's Progress Party	Malekula
Deputy Prime Minister; Minister of Trade, Commerce, Industries and Tourism	Ham Lini	National United Party	Pentecost
Minister of Agriculture, Forestry, Quarantine and Fisheries	James Nwango	People's Progress Party	Ambae
Minister of Cooperatives and Ni-Vanuatu Business Development	Don Ken	Independent	Malekula
Minister of Education	Marcellino Pipite	Republican Party	Santo
Minister of Finance and Economic Management	Moana Carcasses Kalosil	Green	Port Vila
Minister of Foreign Affairs and External Trade	Alfred Carlot	Republican Party	Efate Rural
Minister of Health	Willie Ruben Abel	Vanua'aku Pati (dissident)	Shepherds
Minister of Infrastructure and Public Utilities	Harry Iauko	Vanua'aku Pati (dissident)	Tanna
Minister of Internal Affairs	George Wells	National United Party	Santo
Minister of Justice and Social Affairs	Ralph Regenvanu	Land and Justice Party	Port Vila
Minister of Lands and Natural Resources	Stephen Kalsakau	Union of Moderate Parties (dissident)	Efate
Minister of Youth and Sports	Morkin Stevens	National United Party	Tanna

=== Natapei Interim Cabinet, June 2011 ===
With Sato Kilman's premiership having been declared null and void on 16 June 2011, Vanuatu briefly had an interim prime minister, Edward Natapei, tasked simply with convening Parliament for the election of a new prime minister. Radio Australia noted that Natapei's "former ministers have become interim ministers until a new prime minister is elected". Ironically, this included Sato Kilman as deputy prime minister. See "Natapei Cabinet (2008-2010)", above.

During his interim, Natapei notably ordered all those who had served as ministers under Kilman to refund their salaries, on the grounds that they had not lawfully held office.

On 20 June, Natapei reshuffled this caretaker Cabinet, producing the following:

Portfolio	Minister	Party	Constituency
Prime Minister; Minister of Public Service	Edward Natapei	Vanua'aku Pati	Port Vila
Minister of Justice and Women's Affairs	Bakoa Kaltonga	Vanua'aku Pati	Efate
Minister of Finance and Economic Management	Sela Molisa	Vanua'aku Pati	Santo
Minister of Lands and Natural Resources	Dominique Morin	Republican Party	Luganville
Minister of Internal Affairs	Patrick Crowby	National United Party	Port Vila
Minister of Infrastructure and Public Utilities	Joshua Kalsakau	Labour Party	Efate
Minister of Education	Charlot Salwai	Union of Moderate Parties	Pentecost
Minister of Foreign Affairs	Joe Natuman	Vanua'aku Pati	Tanna
Minister of Agriculture, Forestry and Fisheries	Samson Samsen	Republican Party	Santo
Minister of Ni-Vanuatu Business	Paul Telukluk	Namangi Aute	Malekula
Minister of Youth and Sports	Eta Rory	Family First Party	Malekula

=== Kilman Cabinets, 2011–13 ===
On 26 June 2011, Sato Kilman was elected prime minister by Parliament, with twenty-nine votes to Serge Vohor's twenty-three, thus beginning his first lawfully recognised term as prime minister. He reinstated his previous Cabinet. Four days later, Minister for Infrastructure Harry Iauko was convicted of aiding and abetting damage to property and aiding and abetting intentional assault, for an assault carried out on Marc Neil-Jones, publisher of the Vanuatu Daily Post. Sentenced to a fine, Iauko retained his Cabinet portfolios.

On 16 January 2012, Kilman sacked his Minister for Justice and Social Affairs, Ralph Regenvanu, accusing him of disloyalty. Regenvanu said he had not been given a specific reason for his dismissal, but that it might have been due to his voting in Parliament against the government's decision for Vanuatu to join the World Trade Organization. Kilman appointed Charlot Salwai (UMP) in his place.

In February 2012, the Union of Moderate Parties expelled Steven Kalsakau and Charlot Salwai (along with backbencher Raphael Worwor) from the party for having joined Kilman's government in defiance of the party's position. They now sit as independent members.

On 20 March, Kilman sacked Health Minister Willie Reuben Abel, accusing him of under-performance in delivering better health services to the people. On 10 April, however, he was reinstated. On 12 April, Kilman gave Harry Iauko ministerial responsibility for Air Vanuatu as a specific portfolio in addition to his Infrastructure and Public Utilities portfolios. Iauko was a former chairman of the board of management of Air Vanuatu.

Following a general election on 30 October 2012, Kilman retained the confidence of the new Parliament to remain prime minister, formed a new coalition and appointed a new Cabinet.

On 8 December, the Minister for Agriculture (and vice-president of the People's Progress Party) Dunstan Hilton stepped down and was replaced by Kalfau Moli, Independent MP for Luganville. Kilman acknowledged that his deputy's consented "sacrifice" was intended to shore up the government's parliamentary majority by securing Moli's support.

On 10 December, Minister for Infrastructure Harry Iauko died suddenly. Tony Nari, Iauko Group MP for Pentecost, was appointed to replace him on 2 January 2013.

On 20 March 2013, Minister for Justice and Social Welfare Thomas Laken and Minister for Ni-Vanuatu Business Marcellino Pipite crossed the floor to join the Opposition, along with six government backbenchers. Lacking a majority with which to govern, Prime Minister Kilman resigned the following day, before a motion of no confidence could be brought against him.

Cabinet on 26 June 2011
Portfolio	Minister	Party	Constituency
Prime Minister	Sato Kilman	People's Progress Party	Malekula
Deputy Prime Minister; Minister of Trade, Commerce, Industries and Tourism	Ham Lini	National United Party	Pentecost
Minister of Agriculture, Forestry, Quarantine and Fisheries	James Nwango	People's Progress Party	Ambae
Minister of Cooperatives and Ni-Vanuatu Business Development	Don Ken	Independent	Malekula
Minister of Education	Marcellino Pipite	Republican Party	Santo
Minister of Finance and Economic Management	Moana Carcasses Kalosil	Green	Port Vila
Minister of Foreign Affairs and External Trade	Alfred Carlot	Republican Party	Efate Rural
Minister of Health	Willie Ruben Abel	Vanua'aku Pati (dissident)	Shepherds
Minister of Infrastructure and Public Utilities	Harry Iauko	Vanua'aku Pati (dissident)	Tanna
Minister of Internal Affairs	George Wells	National United Party	Santo
Minister of Justice and Social Affairs	Ralph Regenvanu	Land and Justice Party	Port Vila
Minister of Lands and Natural Resources	Stephen Kalsakau	Union of Moderate Parties (dissident)	Efate
Minister of Youth and Sports	Morkin Stevens	National United Party	Tanna

Cabinet on 30 November 2012
Portfolio	Minister	Party	Constituency
Prime Minister	Sato Kilman	People's Progress Party	Malekula
Deputy Prime Minister; Minister of Trade, Commerce and Industry	Ham Lini	National United Party	Pentecost
Minister of Agriculture, Forestry, Quarantine and Fisheries	Dunstan Hilton	People's Progress Party	Banks and Torres
Minister of Civil Aviation	Samson Samsen	Nagriamel	Santo
Minister of Education, Youth and Sport	Steven Kalsakau	Reunification Movement for Change (UMP dissident)	Efate
Minister of Finance	Charlot Salwai	Reunification Movement for Change (UMP dissident)	Pentecost
Minister of Foreign Affairs and External Trade	Alfred Carlot	Natatok	Efate Rural
Minister of Health	Don Ken	People's Services Party	Malekula
Minister of Infrastructure, Public Utilities and Public Service	Harry Iauko	Iauko Group (Vanua'aku Pati dissident)	Tanna
Minister of Internal Affairs	Toara Daniel Kalo	Green Confederation	Shepherds
Minister of Justice and Social Welfare	Thomas Laken	Independent	Tanna
Minister of Lands	James Bule	National United Party	Ambae
Minister of Ni-Vanuatu Business	Marcellino Pipite	Republican Party	Santo

=== Carcasses Cabinet, 2013–14 ===
On 23 March 2013, following Sato Kilman's resignation, Parliament elected Moana Carcasses Kalosil as prime minister. Carcasses named the following Cabinet. He abolished the Ministry of Civil Aviation, re-established the pre-existing Ministry of Youth Development and Sports, merged the Ministry of Ni-Vanuatu Business Development and the Ministry of Trade into a new Ministry of Tourism and Commerce, and created a new Ministry of Planning and Climate Change, in line with his being the country's first government leader from the Green Confederation.

Portfolio	Minister	Party	Constituency
Prime Minister	Moana Carcasses Kalosil	Green Confederation	Port Vila
Deputy Prime Minister; Minister for Foreign Affairs	Edward Natapei	Vanua'aku Pati	Port Vila
Minister of Finance	Willie Jimmy	Liberal Democratic Party	Port Vila
Minister for Education	Bob Loughman	Vanua'aku Pati	Tanna
Minister for Lands, Geology, Mines, Energy and Water resources	Ralph Regenvanu	Land and Justice Party	Port Vila
Minister for Infrastructure and Public Utilities	Esmon Sae	Melanesian Progressive Party	Malekula
Minister for Internal Affairs	Patrick Crowby	Union of Moderate Parties	Port Vila
Minister for Agriculture, Livestock, Forestry, Fisheries and Biosecurity	David Tosul	People's Progress Party	Pentecost
Minister for Tourism and Commerce	Marcellino Pipite	Vanuatu Republican Party	Santo Rural
Minister for Health	Serge Vohor	Union of Moderate Parties	Santo Rural
Minister for Justice and Social Welfare	Maki Simelum	Vanua'aku Pati	Ambrym
Minister for Youth Development and Sports	Tony Wright	Union of Moderate Parties	Port Vila
Minister for Planning and Climate Change Adaptation	Thomas Laken	Independent	Tanna

In May 2013, Carcasses sacked his finance minister, Willie Jimmy, "amid reports the veteran politician was in talks with the opposition about a possible defection", which Jimmy denied. Maki Simelum, who had been Minister for Justice, replaced him, while Silas Yatan (Greens, MP for Tanna) was given the Justice portfolio.

On 5 July, Yatan himself was shuffled out of the ministry, a day after having publicly suggested that the death penalty should be reinstated to deter murderers. Carcasses rejected the suggestion, and made Yatan his parliamentary secretary, entrusting the Justice portfolio to Green MP Daniel Toara. The change was reportedly made to "lend balance to the regional distribution of portfolios, to ensure Shefa Province had a portfolio".

On 11 July, Trade Minister Marcellino Pipite was sacked, for having reportedly supported a failed motion of no confidence against the government that he was a part of. On 3 August, Daniel Toara was reshuffled to the vacant position of Minister for Trade, Tourism and Commerce, and Jonas James, until then the first deputy Speaker, was appointed Minister for Justice.

On 27 December 2013, Interior Minister Patrick Crowby died, after several days in hospital for unspecified causes, at the age of 55. On 20 February 2014, backbencher Christophe Emelee (MP for Torba; head of the Vanuatu National Party) was sworn in to replace him.

On 26 February, following the defection of government MPs to the Opposition (including Justice Minister Jonas James), Carcasses reshuffled his Cabinet to offer positions to Opposition members. Four Opposition MPs joined his government, in exchange for Cabinet positions. Stephen Kalsakau (Reunification of Moderate Parties) was appointed Minister of Climate Change. Paul Telukluk (Reunification of Moderate Parties) became Minister for Internal Affairs, replacing Christophe Emelee, who was reshuffled to the position of Minister for Justice. Daniel Toara was dismissed from his position as Minister for Trade, to make way for Willie Jimmy (Liberal Party). Tony Wright (Union of Moderate Parties), who had been Minister for Youth and Sports before defecting to the Opposition, regained his position upon re-defecting to the government.

Thus, this was Carcasses' final Cabinet line-up before the fall of his government on 15 May 2014:

Portfolio	Minister	Party	Constituency
Prime Minister	Moana Carcasses Kalosil	Green Confederation	Port Vila
Deputy Prime Minister; Minister for Foreign Affairs	Edward Natapei	Vanua'aku	Port Vila
Minister of Finance	Maki Simelum	Vanua'aku	Ambrym
Minister for Education	Bob Loughman	Vanua'aku	Tanna
Minister for Lands, Geology, Mines, Energy and Water resources	Ralph Regenvanu	Land and Justice	Port Vila
Minister for Infrastructure and Public Utilities	Esmon Sae	Melanesian Progressive	Malekula
Minister for Internal Affairs	Paul Telukluk	Union of Moderate Parties	Malakula
Minister for Agriculture, Livestock, Forestry, Fisheries and Biosecurity	David Tosul	People's Progress	Pentecost
Minister for Tourism and Commerce	Willie Jimmy	Liberal Democratic	Port Vila
Minister for Health	Serge Vohor	Union of Moderate Parties	Santo Rural
Minister for Justice and Social Welfare	Christophe Emelee	National	Torba
Minister for Youth Development and Sports	Tony Wright	Union of Moderate Parties	Port Vila
Minister for Planning and Climate Change Adaptation	Stephen Kalsakau	Reunification of Moderate Parties	Efate Rural

=== Natuman Cabinet, 2014–15 ===
On 15 May 2014, several parties (including the Vanua'aku Pati and the Land and Justice Party) defected from the Carcasses coalition, and joined the Opposition to bring down the government through a motion of no confidence. Parliament then elected Joe Natuman as prime minister, with forty votes out of fifty-two. He named the following Cabinet:

Portfolio	Minister	Party	Constituency
Prime Minister	Joe Natuman	Vanua'aku Pati	Tanna
Deputy Prime Minister; Minister for Trade and Commerce	Ham Lini	National United Party	Pentecost
Minister for Foreign Affairs and Trade	Sato Kilman	People's Progress Party	Malakula
Minister of Finance	Maki Simelum	Vanua'aku Pati	Ambrym
Minister for Internal Affairs	Charlot Salwai	Reunification Movement for Change	Pentecost
Minister for Education	Bob Loughman	Vanua'aku Pati	Tanna
Minister for Health	George Wells	People's Progress Party	Luganville
Minister for Justice	Alfred Carlot	Natatok	Efate Rural
Minister for Climate Change	James Bule	National United Party	Ambae
Minister for Lands	Ralph Regenvanu	Land and Justice Party	Port Vila
Minister for Agriculture, Forestry and Fisheries	David Tosul	Land and Justice Party	Pentecost
Minister for Youth and Sport	Don Ken	Independent	Malakula
Minister for Infrastructure	Esmon Sae	Melanesian Progressive Party	Malakula

In early May 2015, Natuman dismissed Youth and Sports minister Don Ken from the Cabinet, and replaced him with John Lum, Nagriamel MP for Espiritu Santo. This was intended to strengthen Nagriamel's support for the government.

In early June 2015, Natuman sacked Foreign Affairs Minister Sato Kilman, for having said publicly that he could support a motion of no confidence against the government. He subsequently announced that he had also removed Justice Minister Alfred Carlot, appointing Opposition MP Hosea Nevu (Iauko Group, MP for Santo Rural) in his place. Opposition MP Kalvau Moli (Independent MP for Luganville) was appointed as Foreign Affairs Minister. The two newly appointed ministers duly withdrew their names from the Opposition's intended motion of no confidence against the government. Nonetheless, the government fell to a motion of no confidence on 11 June.

=== Kilman Cabinet, 2015–16 ===
On 11 June 2015, three government MPs crossed the floor, enabling the Opposition to oust Joe Natuman's government through a motion of no confidence. Natuman's previously sacked Foreign Affairs Minister Sato Kilman, who had been prime minister from 2011 to 2013, was chosen by Parliament to serve as prime minister again. He appointed the following Cabinet.

Portfolio	Minister	Party	Constituency
Prime Minister	Sato Kilman	People's Progress Party	Malekula
Minister for Trade	Moana Carcasses	Green Confederation	Port Vila
Minister for Internal Affairs	Hosea Nevu	Iauko Group	Santo Rural
Minister for Foreign Affairs	Serge Vohor	Union of Moderate Parties	Santo Rural
Minister of Finance	Willie Jimmy	VLDP	Port Vila
Minister for Lands	Paul Telukluk	RMC	Malekula
Minister for Public Utilities	Tony Nari	Iauko Group	Pentecost
Minister for Justice	Dunstan Hilton	People's Progress Party	Banks & Torres
Minister for Climate Change	Thomas Laken	Iauko Group	Tanna
Minister for Education	Alfred Carlot	Natatok	Efate Rural
Minister for Health	Morkin Steven	National United Party	Tanna
Minister for Youth and Sport	Toara Daniel	Green Confederation	Shepherds
Minister for Agriculture	Christophe Emelee	Vanuatu National Party	Banks & Torres

In August 2015, legal proceedings were initiated against 18 government MPs accused of corruption—specifically, of having accepted bribes. Among them were five government ministers, including Deputy Prime Minister Moana Carcasses. Finance Minister Willie Jimmy pleaded guilty when brought to court on 2 September; the other accused all pleaded not guilty. On 9 October, 14 government MPs were convicted of bribery; among them, Deputy Prime Minister Moana Carcasses Kalosil, Foreign Affairs Minister Serge Vohor, Lands Minister Paul Telukluk, Public Utilities Minister Tony Nari, Climate Change Minister Thomas Laken, and parliamentary Speaker Marcellino Pipite. Pipite, as acting president (President Baldwin Lonsdale being out of the country at the time) swiftly issued a full pardon for himself and his colleagues (with the exception of Willie Jimmy).

While President Lonsdale promised to address the situation, and Prime Minister Kilman remained silent several days after the pardons, Education Minister Alfred Carlot defected to the Opposition along with backbenchers Don Ken and Isaac Hamariliu, to support a motion of no confidence against Kilman's government. On 16 October, Lonsdale revoked the pardons, citing their unconstitutionality (pardons may only apply to a sentence, not to a conviction), and Pipite's breach of the leadership code of good conduct. Ministers Telukluk, Nari, and Laken were promptly arrested on a charge of conspiracy to defeat the course of justice, for having pushed Pipite to issue the pardons. Upon their arrest, they were removed from government by Kilman. Pipite himself was also arrested on that charge, along with government backbenchers Silas Yatan, Tony Wright, John Amos, Arnold Prasad, Sebastian Harry, Jean-Yves Chabot and Jonas James. The Kilman government nonetheless challenged in court the legality of Lonsdale's revocation of the pardons. The court dismissed the challenge, confirming that Pipite's pardons had been invalid (due largely to a conflict of interest), and that Lonsdale had acted legally in revoking them.

On 22 October, the Supreme Court sentenced Carcasses to four years in jail, and Vohor, Pipite and the other convicted MPs to three years. Jimmy received a 20-month suspended sentence. Don Ken, returning to the government benches after having briefly defected to the Opposition, was sworn in as the new Minister for Public Infrastructure and Public Utilities, as Sato Kilman resisted calls to resign.

On 11 November, Dunstan Hilton was reshuffled to the position of Minister for Trade, and was replaced as Minister for Justice by Robert Bohn, brought in from the back benches. Christopher Emelee, the Minister for Agriculture, was appointed deputy prime minister. Havo Molisale (Nagriamel) replaced Serge Vohor as Minister for Foreign Affairs.

=== Salwai Cabinet, 2016–18 ===
Follow the general election on 22 January 2016, Charlot Salwai was chosen by Parliament to form a government on 11 February. He announced the following Cabinet.

Portfolio	Minister	Party
Prime Minister	Charlot Salwai	Reunification of Movements for Change
Deputy Prime Minister, Minister for Trade	Joe Natuman	Vanua'aku Pati
Minister for Internal Affairs	Andrew Napuat	Graon mo Jastis Party
Minister for Foreign Affairs	Ralph Regenvanu	Graon mo Jastis Party
Minister for Finance	Gaetan Pikioune	Nagriamel
Minister for Lands and Natural Resources	Alfred Maoh	Graon mo Jastis Party
Minister for Public Utilities	Jotham Napat	Leaders Party of Vanuatu
Minister for Justice	Ronald Warsal	Vanua'aku Pati
Minister for Climate Change	Ham Lini	National United Party
Minister for Education	Jean-Pierre Nirua	Independent
Minister for Health	Gratien Shedrack	Leaders Party of Vanuatu
Minister for Youth and Sport	Seule Simeon	Union of Moderate Parties
Minister for Agriculture	Seremaia Matai	Independent

=== Salwai Cabinet, 2018-20 ===
Follow the general election on 22 January 2016, Charlot Salwai was chosen by Parliament to form a government on 11 February. This initial Salwai Cabinet was reshuffled on 12 November 2018 when the Honorable Prime Minister Charlot Salwai appointed three new State Ministers, replacing the previous Ministers responsible for MIPU, MoAFFLB and MoJ. Removal Orders for these offices were signed by acting prime minister Bob Loughman on 8 November 2018, as per the powers conferred on him by subarticle 42(3) of the Constitution. Vanua'aku Party (VP) was removed from Government by Prime Minister Charlot Salwai on 15 June 2019 and Leaders Party Vanuatu (LPV) was added to the coalition. The Prime Minister reappointed president of LPV Jotham Napat as the new deputy prime minister and Minister for Trade, Tourism, Industry and Cooperatives and Matai Seremaiah as the new Minister of Agriculture, Livestock, Forestry, Fisheries and Biosecurity, replacing Bob Loughman and Hosea Nevu. This reshuffle resulted in the current Cabinet:

Portfolio	Minister	Party
Prime Minister	Charlot Salwai	Reunification of Movements for Change
Deputy Prime Minister, Minister for Trade, Tourism, Industry and Cooperatives	Jotham Napat	Leaders Party of Vanuatu
Minister for Internal Affairs	Andrew Napuat	Graon mo Jastis Party
Minister for Foreign Affairs	Ralph Regenvanu	Graon mo Jastis Party
Minister for Finance	Gaetan Pikioune	Nagriamel
Minister for Lands and Natural Resources	Alfred Maoh	Graon mo Jastis Party
Minister for Public Utilities	Christophe Emelee	Vanuatu National Development Party
Minister for Justice	Don Ken Stephen	Peoples Development Services Party (PDSP)
Minister for Climate Change	Ham Lini	National United Party
Minister for Education	Jean-Pierre Nirua	Independent
Minister for Health	Jack Norris Kalmet	Leaders Party of Vanuatu
Minister for Youth and Sport	Seule Simeon	Union of Moderate Parties
Minister for Agriculture, Livestock, Forestry, Fisheries and Biosecurity	Matai Seremaiah	Leaders Party of Vanuatu

=== Loughman Cabinet, 2020–22 ===
Bob Loughman appointed the members of his government on 21 April 2020.

Portfolio	Member	Party
Prime Minister	Bob Loughman	Vanua'aku Pati
Deputy Prime Minister Minister for Internal Affairs	Ishmael Kalsakau	Union of Moderate Parties
Minister for Agriculture, Livestock, Forestry, Fisheries and Biosecurity	Kalo Willie	Union of Moderate Parties
Minister of Climate Change	Bruno Lengkon	National United Party
Minister of Education and Training	Simeon Seule	Reunification Movement for Change
Minister of Finance and Economic Management	Johnny Koanapo	Vanua'aku Pati
Minister of Foreign Affairs and External Trade	Mark Ati	Iauko Group
Minister of Health	Silas Bule	National United Party
Minister of Infrastructure and Public Utilities	Jay Ngwele	Rural Development Party
Minister of Justice and Community Services	Esmon Saimon	Vanua'aku Pati
Minister of Land and Natural Resources	Norris Kalmet	Reunification Movement for Change
Ministry of Tourism, Trade, Commerce and Ni-Vanuatu Business	James Bule	People Unity Development Party
Minister of Youth Development and Training	Willie Saetearoto	Green Confederation

=== Kalsakau Cabinet, 2022–23 ===
Alatoi Ishmael Kalsakau Mau'koro appointed his cabinet, after his election during the First Sitting of Parliament for this 13th Legislature, on 4 November 2022.

Portfolio	Member	Party
Prime Minister	Ishmael Kalsakau	Union of Moderate Parties
Minister for Agriculture, Livestock, Forestry, Fisheries and Biosecurity	Nakou Natuman	Union of Moderate Parties
Minister of Climate Change	Ralph Regenvanu	Land and Justice Party
Minister of Education and Training	Bruno Lengkon	National United Party
Minister of Finance and Economic Management	John Salong	Land and Justice Party
Minister of Foreign Affairs and External Trade	Jotham Napat	Leaders Party Vanuatu
Minister of Health	Rick Tchamako	Reunification Movement for Change
Minister of Infrastructure and Public Utilities	Macellino Barthelemy	Reunification Movement for Change
Minister of Justice and Community Services	John Still Tari Qetu	National United Party
Minister of Internal Affairs	Christophe Emelee	Vanuatu National Development Party
Minister for Land and Natural Resources	John Timakata	Vanua'aku Pati (dissident)
Minister of Tourism, Trade, Commerce and Ni-Vanuatu Business	Matai Seremaiah	Leaders Party Vanuatu
Minister of Youth Development and Training	Tomker Netvunei	Leaders Party Vanuatu

On 8 August 2023, Ishmael Kalsakau reshuffled the cabinet ahead of a no-confidence-motion.

Portfolio	Member	Party	Term
Prime Minister	Ishmael Kalsakau	Union of Moderate Parties	Since 4 November 2022
Deputy Prime Minister Minister of Foreign Affairs	Jotham Napat		Until 8 August 2023
Deputy Prime Minister Minister of Foreign Affairs	Matai Seremaiah		Since 8 August 2023
Minister of Trade	Matai Seremaiah		Until 8 August 2023
Minister of Trade	Samson Samsen		Since 8 August 2023
Minister for Education	Bruno Leingkon		Until 8 August 2023
Minister for Education	Christophe Emmelee		Since 8 August 2023

=== Salwai Cabinet, 2023-25 ===
Portfolio	Member	Party
Prime Minister	Charlot Salwai	Reunification of Movement for Change
Minister for Agriculture, Livestock, Forestry, Fisheries and Biosecurity	Emanuel Xavier Harry	Iauko Group
Minister of Climate Change	John Salong	Land and Justice Party
Minister of Education and Training Services	Simil Johnson	Leaders Party of Vanuatu
Minister of Finance and Economic Management	Johnny Koanapo	Vanua'aku Pati
Deputy Prime Minister and Minister of Foreign Affairs	Matai Seramiah	Leaders Party of Vanuatu
Minister of Health	John Still Tari Qetu	Iauko Group
Minister of Infrastructure and Public Utilities	Marc Ati	Iauko Group
Minister of Justice and Community Services	John Amos	Leaders Party of Vanuatu
Minister of Internal Affairs	Andrew Solomon Napuat	Land and Justice Party
Minister for Lands and Natural Resources	Rick Tchamako Mahe	Reunification of Movement for Change
Minister of Trade and Commerce	Samson Samsen	Vanua'aku Pati
Minister of Youth and Sport	Tomker Netvunei	Nagriamel
