= List of members of the Parliament of Vanuatu (2012–2016) =

The 52 members of the Parliament of Vanuatu from 2012 to 2016 were elected on 30 October 2012.

== List of members ==
Constituency	Member	Party	Notes
Ambae	James Bule	National United Party	
Ambae	Richard Mera	Vanua'aku Pati	
Ambae	Peter Vuta	Independent	
Ambrym	Lenkon Tao Bruno	National United Party	
Ambrym	Maki Simelum	Vanua'aku Pati	
Banks and Torres	Christopher Emelee	Vanuatu National Party	
Banks and Torres	Dunstan Hilton	People's Progress Party	
Efate	Alfred Rolland Carlot	Natatok	
Efate	Steven Kalsakau	Reunification Movement for Change	
Efate	Nato Taiwia	Melanesian Progressive Party	
Efate	Gillion William	Land and Justice Party	
Epi	Isaac Hamariliu	People's Progress Party	
Epi	Robert Bohn Sikol	Vanuatu Progressive Development Party	
Luganville	Kalvau Moli	Independent	
Luganville	George Wells	People's Progress Party	
Maewo	Philip Boedoro	Vanua'aku Pati	
Malekula	Jerome Ludvaune	Union of Moderate Parties	
Malekula	Simeon Kaltaliu	Vanua'aku Pati	
Malekula	Sato Kilman	People's Progress Party	
Malekula	Daniel Nalet	Land and Justice Party	
Malekula	Esmon Saimon	Melanesian Progressive Party	
Malekula	Don Ken Stephen	People's Services Party	
Malekula	Paul Telukluk	Reunification Movement for Change	
Malo–Aore	Havo Molisale	Nagriamel	
Paama	Jonas James	Natatok	
Pentecost	Ham Lin̄i	National United Party	
Pentecost	Tony Nari	Iauko Group	
Pentecost	Charlot Salwai	Reunification Movement for Change	
Pentecost	David Tosul	People's Progress Party	
Port Vila	Moana Carcasses Kalosil	Green Confederation	
Port Vila	Patrick Manarewo	Union of Moderate Parties	
Port Vila	Edward Natapei	Vanua'aku Pati	Natapei died in July 2015. Kenneth Natapei (VP) won the subsequent by-election
Port Vila	Ralph Regenvanu	Land and Justice Party	
Port Vila	Willie Tapangararua	Vanuatu Liberal Democratic Party	
Port Vila	Antoine Wright	Union of Moderate Parties	
Santo	John Lum	Nagriamel	
Santo	Alfred Moah	Land and Justice Party	
Santo	Hosea Nevu	Iauko Group	
Santo	Marcellino Pipite	Vanuatu Republican Party	
Santo	Arnold Prasad	Green Confederation	
Santo	Samson Samsen	Nagriamel	
Santo	Serge Vohor	Union of Moderate Parties	
Shepherds	Daniel Kalo	Green Confederation	
Southern Islands	Tesei John Nawai	Vanua'aku Pati	
Tanna	Harry Iauko	Iauko Group	Iauko died in December 2012. Pascal Iauko (IG) was elected in the subsequent by-election
Tanna	Thomas Laken	Independent	
Tanna	Bob Loughman	Vanua'aku Pati	
Tanna	Steven Morking	National United Party	
Tanna	Joe Natuman	Vanua'aku Pati	
Tanna	Richard Namel Ruan	Independent	
Tanna	Silas Ratan Rouard	Union of Moderate Parties	
Tongoa	John Vacher Amos	People's Progress Party	
Source: Official Gazette
