= Minister of Foreign Affairs (Vanuatu) =

This is a list of foreign ministers of Vanuatu.

- 1980–1983: Walter Lini
- 1983: Donald Kalpokas
- 1983–1987: Sela Molisa
- 1987–1991: Donald Kalpokas
  - 1988: Barak Sopé (in opposition)
- 1991: Edward Natapei
- 1991–1993: Serge Vohor
- 1993–1995: Maxime Carlot Korman
- 1995–1996: Alfred Maseng
- 1996: Amos Bangabiti
- 1996–1997: Willie Jimmy
- 1997: Amos Andeng
- 1997–1998: Vital Soksok
- 1998: Donald Kalpokas
- 1998–1999: Clement Leo
- 1999–2001: Serge Vohor
- 2001–2002: Alain Mahe
- 2002–2003: Serge Vohor
- 2003–2004: Moana Carcasses Kalosil
- 2004: Barak Sopé
- 2004: Marcellino Pipite
- 2004–2007: Sato Kilman
- 2007–2008: George Wells
- 2008–2009: Bakoa Kaltongga
- 2009–2010: Joe Natuman
- 2010–2011: George Wells
- 2011: Joe Natuman
- 2011: George Wells
- 2011: Alfred Carlot
- 2011: Joe Natuman
- 2011–2013: Alfred Carlot
- 2013–2014: Edward Natapei
- 2014–2015: Sato Kilman
- 2015: Kalvau Moli
- 2015: Serge Vohor
- November 2015–January 2016: Havo Molisale (acting)
- 2016–2017: Bruno Leingkone
- 2017–2020: Ralph Regenvanu
- 2020–2022: Marc Ati
- 2022–2023: Jotham Napat
- 2023–2023: Matai Seremaiah
- 2023–2023: Marc Ati
- 2023–present: Matai Seremaiah

== Sources ==
- Rulers.org – Foreign ministers S–Z
