= Esmon Saimon =

Ni-Vanuatuan politician (born 1955)

Esmon Esai Saimon
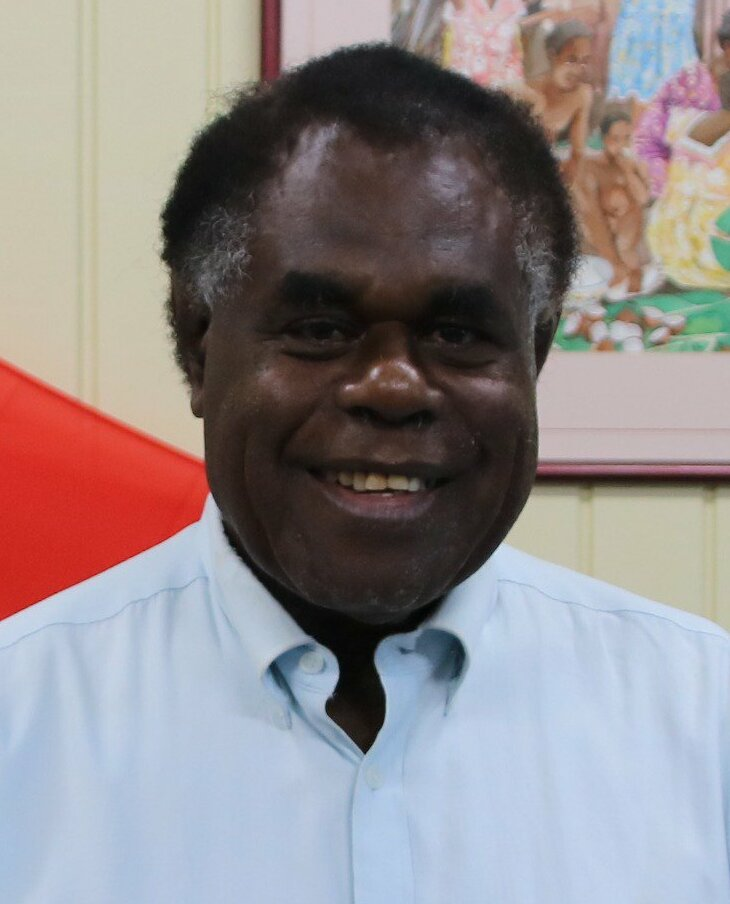
- Saimon in 2019

Speaker of the Parliament
- In office 11 February 2016 – 6 September 2019
- Preceded by: Marcellino Pipite
- Succeeded by: Seoule Simeon

Acting President of Vanuatu
- In office 17 June 2017 – 6 July 2017
- Prime Minister: Charlot Salwai
- Preceded by: Baldwin Lonsdale
- Succeeded by: Tallis Obed Moses

Minister for Infrastructure and Public Utilities
- In office 23 March 2013 – 11 June 2015
- Prime Minister: Moana Carcasses Kalosil; Joe Natuman
- Preceded by: Tony Nari
- Succeeded by: Tony Nari

Minister for Cooperatives and Ni-Vanuatu Business Development
- In office 13 May 2011 – 17 May 2011
- Prime Minister: Sato Kilman
- Preceded by: Paul Telukluk
- Succeeded by: Don Ken
- In office 18 February 2011 – 24 April 2011
- Prime Minister: Sato Kilman
- Preceded by: Ralph Regenvanu
- Succeeded by: Paul Telukluk

Personal details
- Born: 28 October 1955 (age 70) Malakula, New Hebrides (now Vanuatu)
- Party: Melanesian Progressive Party

Esmon Esai Saimon, also referred to as Esmon Sae (born 28 October 1955), is a Vanuatuan politician. From 11 February 2016 to 6 September 2019 he was Speaker of the Parliament, and in that role from 17 June 2017 to 6 July 2017 served as the acting president of Vanuatu upon the death of Baldwin Lonsdale.

== Career ==
He worked first as Secretary to the South West Bay Cooperative Society, from 1978 to 1982, then went into private business (in "retail and fishing") until 1998.

He served in office in the Malampa Province assembly from 1992 to 1996, then was elected Member of the national Parliament for Malekula in the December 1998 general election. He is currently a member of the Melanesian Progressive Party.

Initially a backbencher, he was appointed Minister for Cooperatives and Ni-Vanuatu Business Development (i.e., indigenous business development) in Prime Minister Sato Kilman's Cabinet on February 18, 2010. Kilman was attempting to consolidate his government's majority prior to an expected vote on a motion of confidence in Parliament. He lost office on April 24 when the Kilman government was ousted in a motion of no confidence, regained it on May 13 when the Court of Appeal declared the election of the new government unconstitutional, and lost it again on May 17 when Kilman reshuffled his government and replaced him with Don Ken.

Kilman's government fell on 21 March 2013 when it lost the confidence of Parliament, and new Prime Minister Moana Carcasses Kalosil appointed Sae to the position of Minister for Infrastructure and Public Utilities two days later. He crossed the floor on 15 May 2014 to help bring down the Carcasses government. New Prime Minister Joe Natuman maintained Saimon at his post as Minister for Infrastructure. He lost office on 11 June 2015 when the Natuman government was ousted in a motion of no confidence.

On 11 February 2016 he was elected as Speaker of the Parliament of Vanuatu. He served until 6 September 2019. He was then appointed Minister of Justice and Social Welfare in 20 April 2020. He served in that role until 2022.

Political offices
Preceded by Baldwin Lonsdale	President of Vanuatu; Acting; 2017	Succeeded by Tallis Obed Moses
