= James Wango =

Ni-Vanuatu politician

James Wango MP

Minister for Agriculture, Livestock, Forestry, Fisheries and Quarantine
- In office 13 May 2011 – 15 June 2011
- Prime Minister: Sato Kilman
- Preceded by: Eta Rory
- Succeeded by: Steven Kalsakau (interim)

Minister for Agriculture, Livestock, Forestry, Fisheries and Quarantine
- In office 20 February 2011 – 24 April 2011
- Prime Minister: Sato Kilman
- Preceded by: Marcellino Pipite
- Succeeded by: Eta Rory

Member of Parliament for Ambae
- Incumbent
- Assumed office 2 September 2008

Personal details
- Party: People's Progress Party

James Wango, also known as James Ngwango, is a ni-Vanuatu politician.

A member of the People's Progress Party, of which he is the treasurer, he was elected to Parliament as MP for Ambae in the September 2008 general election, one of four MPs from the People's Progress Party.

In December 2010, Prime Minister Edward Natapei was ousted in a motion of no confidence, and PPP leader Sato Kilman replaced him. Kilman set up a coalition government, which did not include Wango, and the latter eventually defected to the Opposition. In February 2011, as the Opposition prepared a motion of no confidence against Kilman's premiership, the Prime Minister secured his majority by offering Wango a position in Cabinet. Wango joined the government as Minister for Agriculture, Livestock, Forestry, Fisheries and Quarantine.

Kilman was eventually ousted in a vote of no confidence on 24 April 2011, however, and Wango lost his position in government. He recovered it three weeks later, on 13 May, when the Court of Appeal voided the election of Serge Vohor's new government on constitutional grounds, and the Kilman government was restored. This lasted for only a month; on 15 June, the Kilman premiership was itself voided on constitutional grounds by the Supreme Court's Chief Justice Vincent Lunabek, and Wango lost office once more.
