= List of ambassadors of Vanuatu to China =

Coordinates: 39.934236°N 116.458556°E

Ambassador of Vanuatu to China
- Incumbent; Nguk Yang Dennis Nai since September 10, 2015
- Inaugural holder: Willie Jimmy
- Formation: May 1, 2009

The Ni-Vanuatu Ambassador in Beijing is the official representative of the Government in Port Vila to the Government of the People's Republic of China.

== List of representatives ==
Diplomatic agrément/Diplomatic accreditation	Ambassador	Observations	Prime Minister of Vanuatu	Premier of the People's Republic of China	Term end
1999		Vanuatu established an honorary consulate in Beijing that became an embassy in 2005.	Donald Kalpokas	Zhu Rongji	
November 15, 2000		The governments in Beijing and Port Vila established diplomatic relations.	Barak Sopé	Zhu Rongji	
May 1, 2009	Willie Jimmy		Edward Natapei	Wen Jiabao	December 13, 2012
December 13, 2012	Nguk Yang Dennis Nai		Sato Kilman	Wen Jiabao	April 2013
February 4, 2014	Sela Molisa		Sato Kilman	Li Keqiang	July 2015
September 10, 2015	Nguk Yang Dennis Nai		Sato Kilman	Li Keqiang	

- China–Vanuatu relations
