= Patrick Crowby =

Vanuatuan politician

Patrick Joseph Manarewo Kalpuaso Crowby (6 July 1958 – 27 December 2013) was a Vanuatuan politician.

Crowby was born in Port Vila in 1958. He began his career as a primary school teacher in 1978. In 1987, he obtained the title of Manarewo as customary chief. In 1991, he became a member of the National Bureau of Tourism. He would subsequently preside over the Bureau from 2007 to 2008.

In 1992, he was appointed president of a sub-committee of the Union of Moderate Parties, a francophone political party; Crowby himself is a francophone. In 1997, now representing the National United Party, he became mayor of Port Vila, the capital city of Vanuatu, a position he held until 2004. He subsequently remained a city councillor until 2006. Transparency International Vanuatu accused him of "mismanagement and corruption" during his term.

From 2004 until 2008, he served as the Prime Minister's public relations officer, and government spokesman. During that same time, he was President of Vanuatu's Broadcasting and Television Corporation, and permanent representative of Vanuatu to the Organisation Internationale de la Francophonie.

In 2008, he was elected to Parliament, and was appointed Minister for Internal Affairs in Prime Minister Edward Natapei's Cabinet, though he was subsequently dismissed during a Cabinet reshuffle. He returned to government in April 2011, when Prime Minister Sato Kilman (who had ousted Natapei in a vote of no confidence in December 2010) was in turn ousted in a vote of no confidence, and succeeded by Serge Vohor. Vohor appointed Crowby Minister for Internal Affairs. Three weeks later, however, Vohor's election and premiership were voided by the Court of Appeal, and Crowby lost his position in government.

On 16 June, Kilman's election and premiership were themselves voided by the Supreme Court, on constitutional grounds, and previous Prime Minister Edward Natapei became caretaker Prime Minister until a new leader could be elected. Crowby was restored as caretaker Minister of the Interior. On 26 June 2011, Sato Kilman was elected Prime Minister by Parliament, and Crowby lost his position in government.

Crowby later sat as a government backbencher, until 20 March 2013 when he was one of eight MPs to cross the floor and bring down the Kilman government. New Prime Minister Moana Carcasses Kalosil appointed him to the position of Minister for the Interior three days later.

== Death ==
He died, aged 55, in New Caledonia on 27 December 2013, several days after having been rushed to hospital there as an unspecified emergency.
