= Pakoa Kaltonga =

Vanuatuan politician (born 1969)

The Honourable Bakoa Kaltongga MP
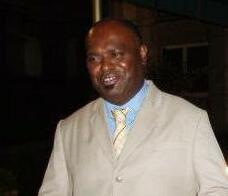
- Kaltongga in 2009

Pakoa Maraki Kaltonga, also known as Bakoa Kaltongga (born 6 April 1969), is a ni-Vanuatu politician. He is a member of the Leaders Party of Vanuatu.

He was elected Member of Parliament for the Rural Efate constituency in the September 2008 general election, and was appointed Minister for Foreign Affairs in Prime Minister Edward Natapei's government.

In June 2009, the election of all four Members for Rural Efate, Kaltonga included, was invalidated by the Supreme Court due to irregularities. Kaltonga consequently lost his position as Minister for Foreign Affairs, and was replaced by Joe Natuman. A by-election on 6 August saw Mr Kaltongga win back his seat, and he subsequently regained a place in Cabinet, as Minister of Justice and Women's Affairs. He lost his place in government when Edward Natapei was ousted by a vote of no confidence on 2 December 2010.

On 24 April 2011, new Prime Minister Sato Kilman was himself ousted in a vote of no confidence, and Serge Vohor succeeded him. Vohor appointed Kaltonga Minister of Finance in his Cabinet. Three weeks later, however, Vohor's election and premiership were voided by the Court of Appeal, and Kaltonga lost his position in government. On 16 June, Kilman's election and premiership were themselves voided by the Supreme Court, on constitutional grounds, and previous Prime Minister Edward Natapei became caretaker Prime Minister until a new leader could be elected. Kaltonga was restored as caretaker Minister of Justice.
