= David Tosul =

Vanuatuan politician

David Tosul Butulso MP

Minister for Agriculture, Livestock, Forestry, Fisheries and Biosecurity
- In office 23 March 2013 – 11 June 2015
- Prime Minister: Moana Carcasses Kalosil; Joe Natuman
- Preceded by: Steven Kalsakau
- Succeeded by: Christope Emelee

MP for Pentecost
- Incumbent
- Assumed office 2 May 2002

Personal details
- Party: National United Party (2002-2012); People's Progress Party (2012-2013); Land and Justice Party (2013-)
- Education: University of the South Pacific

David Tosul Butulso is a Vanuatuan politician.

He studied at the Tagabe Agriculture College from 1982 to 1984, then studied agriculture at the Alafua campus at the University of the South Pacific in Apia, Samoa from 1989 to 1990. He worked in the field of agricultural administration before going into politics.

Representing the centre-left National United Party, he was first elected to the Parliament of Vanuatu as MP for Pentecost Island in the 2002 general election. He retained his seat in 2004, 2008 and 2012.

In April 2012, he crossed the floor to the People’s Progressive Party, led by the then Prime Minister Sato Kilman. In March 2014, Kilman resigned, no longer having the support of a majority in Parliament. New Prime Minister Moana Carcasses Kalosil (of the Green Confederation) appointed Tosul as his Minister for Agriculture, Livestock, Forestry, Fisheries and Biosecurity. In September 2013, Tosul joined Ralph Regenvanu's Land and Justice Party.

With Regenvanu, he crossed the floor on 15 May 2014 to help bring down the Carcasses government. New Prime Minister Joe Natuman maintained Tosul at his post as Minister for Agriculture, Forestry and Fisheries. He lost office on 11 June 2015 when the Natuman government was ousted in a motion of no confidence.
