= Thomas Laken =

Vanuatu politician (born 1972)

Thomas Laken MP

Minister for Planning and Climate Change Adaptation
- Incumbent
- Assumed office 11 June 2015
- Prime Minister: Sato Kilman
- Preceded by: James Bule
- In office 23 March 2013 – 15 May 2014
- Prime Minister: Moana Carcasses Kalosil
- Preceded by: position created
- Succeeded by: James Bule

Minister for Justice and Social Welfare
- In office November 2012 – 20 March 2013
- Prime Minister: Sato Kilman
- Preceded by: Charlot Salwai
- Succeeded by: Maki Simelum

MP for Tanna
- Incumbent
- Assumed office 30 October 2012

Personal details
- Party: Independent (2012-2013); Green Confederation (2013-)

Thomas Laken, born 3 March 1972, is a Vanuatuan politician.

Self-employed in the shipping service, he later worked as a primary school teacher. He was first elected to the Parliament of Vanuatu as Independent MP for Tanna, in the 2012 general election. Prime Minister Sato Kilman appointed him as Minister of Justice and Social Welfare. In February 2013, Laken joined the Green Confederation. On 20 March, Thomas Laken and Minister for Ni-Vanuatu Business Marcellino Pipite crossed the floor to join the Opposition, along with six government backbenchers. Lacking a majority with which to govern, Kilman resigned the following day, before a motion of no confidence could be brought against him. New Prime Minister Moana Carcasses Kalosil (of the Green Confederation, the country's first Green Prime Minister) appointed him as Minister for Planning and Climate Change Adaptation. He lost office when Carcasses' government was ousted in a motion of no confidence on 15 May 2014, then resumed office when the new government of Joe Natuman was itself ousted in the same manner on 11 June 2015, and Sato Kilman became prime minister.
