= Sela Molisa =

Vanuatuan politician (1950–2022)

Sela Molisa MP

Minister of Trade
- In office 24 April 2011 – 13 May 2011
- Prime Minister: Serge Vohor; Edward Natapei
- Preceded by: Ham Lini
- Succeeded by: Ham Lini
- In office 20 June 2011 – September 2012 (interim)
- Preceded by: George Wells

Minister of Finance and Economic Management
- In office 22 September 2008 – 2 December 2010
- Prime Minister: Edward Natapei
- Preceded by: Willie Jimmy
- Succeeded by: Moana Carcasses Kalosil

Member of the ni-Vanuatu Parliament for Espiritu Santo
- In office August 1982 – September 2012

Personal details
- Born: 15 December 1950 Espiritu Santo, New Hebrides (now Vanuatu)
- Died: 21 August 2022 (aged 71) Port Vila, Efate, Vanuatu
- Party: Vanua'aku Pati
- Spouse: Grace Mera Molisa (m. 1976 to 2002; her death)

Sela Molisa (15 December 1950 – 21 August 2022) was a Vanuatuan politician, who was a member of the Parliament of Vanuatu from 1982 to 2012, and occupied several cabinet posts in the government during his career, including four mandates as the minister of finance.

== Education ==
Molisa attended a British colonial secondary school in what was then the New Hebrides from 1966 to 1970, before studying at the University of the South Pacific in Suva, Dominion of Fiji from 1971 to 1973. He then studied at the Fiji School of Medicine in 1974.

== Career ==
Molisa was a Member of Parliament from 1982 to 2012, representing two constituencies in his home island of Espiritu Santo. He served as Minister of Home Affairs in 1983; as Minister of Foreign Affairs from 1983 to 1987; as Minister of Finance from 1987 to 1991; as Minister of Trade, Commerce and Industry in 1996; as Minister of Finance again from 1998 to 1999; as Minister of Lands and Natural Resources from 2001 to 2002; and as Minister of Finance thrice more from 2002 to 2004 and from 2008 to 2010 and from 2011 to 2012. Each time he held the position of Minister of Finance, he was also Governor of the World Bank Group, the International Monetary Fund and the Asian Development Bank.

In the late 1980s, as Foreign Minister, he oversaw a commercial fishing agreement with the Soviet Union. As Minister of Finance, he oversaw the removing of Vanuatu from the OECD List of Uncooperative Tax Havens. He also sought to encourage the use of coconut oil, derived from Vanuatu-produced copra, to fuel automobiles so as to reduce the country's dependence on imported oil.

In March 2006, Molisa accused Ham Lini's government of indecisiveness on a number of issues, and attempted to replace him as prime minister though a motion of no confidence in Parliament. Molisa was supported by the Green Confederation, the Melanesian Progressive Party and the Union of Moderate Parties, but the motion failed.

In June 2008, Molisa became chairman of the independent monitoring group tasked with overseeing the preparation of the Republic of the Fiji Islands' People's Charter for Change, Peace and Progress.

In September 2008, he was appointed Finance Minister once more, but lost his post on 2 December 2010 when the Natapei government was ousted in a motion of no confidence, and he sat on the opposition benches for the next four months. On 24 April 2011, new Prime Minister Sato Kilman was himself ousted in a motion of no confidence, and succeeded by Serge Vohor. Vohor appointed Molisa as his Minister of Trade; three weeks later, however, Vohor's election and premiership were voided by the Court of Appeal, and Molisa lost his position in government. On 16 June, Kilman's election and premiership were themselves voided by the Supreme Court, on constitutional grounds, and previous Prime Minister Edward Natapei became caretaker Prime Minister until a new leader could be elected. Molisa was restored as caretaker Minister of Trade.

He later served as Ambassador of Vanuatu to the People’s Republic of China from 2014 to 2015.

Sela Molisa was married to Grace Mera Molisa, an influential politician and poet who died in 2002. They were married in 1976, and both took part in preparing the Constitution of Vanuatu.
