= Maki Simelum =

Vanuatuan politician (born 1961)

Maki Simelum MP

Minister of Finance
- In office 10 May 2013 – 11 June 2015
- Prime Minister: Moana Carcasses Kalosil; Joe Natuman
- Preceded by: Willie Jimmy
- Succeeded by: Willie Jimmy

Minister for Justice and Social Welfare
- In office 23 March 2013 – 10 May 2013
- Prime Minister: Moana Carcasses Kalosil
- Preceded by: Thomas Laken
- Succeeded by: Silas Yatan

Member of Parliament for Ambrym
- Incumbent
- Assumed office 30 October 2012

Personal details
- Party: Vanua'aku Pati

Maki Stanley Simelum (born 16 May 1961), is a Vanuatuan politician.

After a Bachelor of Arts degree Accounting & Economics at the University of the South Pacific in Fiji in 1990, he became the finance manager of the Development Bank of vanuatu in 1992. He obtained a Master's degree in Business Finance at the University of Technology, Sydney, in 1999. In 2001 he became CEO of the Asset Management Unit, a public agency working with the National Bank.

In the general election on 30 October 2012, he was elected to Parliament for the first time, as MP for Ambrym, representing the Vanua'aku Pati. On 23 March 2013, following Sato Kilman's resignation, Parliament elected Moana Carcasses Kalosil as Prime Minister. Carcasses appointed Simelum as his Minister for Justice and Social Welfare. In May, Carcasses sacked his Minister of Finance, Willie Jimmy, "amid reports the veteran politician was in talks with the opposition about a possible defection", which Jimmy denied. Simelum replaced him, while Silas Yatan (Greens MP for Tanna) was given the Justice portfolio.

Like other members of the Vanua'aku Pati, he crossed the floor on 15 May 2014 to help bring down the Carcasses government. New Prime Minister Joe Natuman maintained Simelum at his post as Minister of Finance. He lost office on 11 June 2015 when the Natuman government was ousted in a motion of no confidence.
