= Mary Sey =

Gambian judge (1952–2024)

Justice of the Supreme Court of the Gambia
- In office 28 April 2017 – 20 August 2024
- President: Adama Barrow

Judge of the Supreme Court of Vanuatu
- In office 2014–2017

Personal details
- Born: Mary Mam Yassin Sey; 21 March 1952
- Died: 20 August 2024 (aged 72)

Mary Mam Yassin Sey, also known as Mary Mamyassin Sey (21 March 1952 – 20 August 2024), was a Gambian judge who previously served as a Justice of the Supreme Court of the Gambia and was also a Judge of the Supreme Court of Vanuatu.

== Early judicial career ==
Sey worked for the United Nations (UN) and the Economic Community of West African States (ECOWAS) in Liberia, and also as a legal adviser in the Office of the Special Representative of the Executive Secretary of ECOWAS. In February 2007, Sey had been appointed to the High Court of Sierra Leone as part of the British Council's Justice Sector Development Programme. During her time in Sierra Leone, she convicted and sentenced a government minister in a corruption case to five years. She served until November 2010, when she was sent by the Commonwealth Secretariat to serve as a judge in Swaziland. She served a two-year contract before being reassigned.

== Supreme Courts ==
=== Vanuatu ===
In 2012, Sey was assigned by the Commonwealth Secretariat to the Court of Appeal of Vanuatu, in the Pacific. In 2014, she was promoted to sit on the Supreme Court of Vanuatu.

In late 2015, Sey oversaw a landmark corruption case in Vanuatu where 16 members of parliament were put on trial for corruption. Sey ruled that all 16 would stand trial under the Penal Code and the Leadership Code Act, despite the fact no one had been tried under the Leadership Code Act in Vanuatu since it was enacted in 1998. Among those on trial was the incumbent Deputy Prime Minister, Moana Carcasses Kalosil, four other cabinet ministers, the Speaker of Parliament, Marcellino Pipite, and two parliamentary secretaries. During the case, Sey warned Carcasses against threatening witnesses after one was forced to report his threats to the police. Sey warned Carcasses that his bail conditions would be revoked.

In the judgement, 14 were convicted, with one having pleaded guilty prior to the case and one other being acquitted. Sey said to the convicts, "You were given power and authority. With power and authority, comes an obligation of trust. You betrayed that trust and in the cause of doing that you undermined the very institution that it was your duty to uphold." An appeals case has since found that Sey "was fully justified" in her ruling.

In 2017, Sey left as a Judge of the Supreme Court of Vanuatu.

=== The Gambia ===
Sey was appointed a Justice of the Supreme Court of the Gambia in April 2017 by President Adama Barrow.

== Death ==
Sey died on 20 August 2024, at the age of 72.

== See also ==
- List of first women lawyers and judges in Africa
