= Dalsie Baniala =

Telecomms manager on Vanuatu

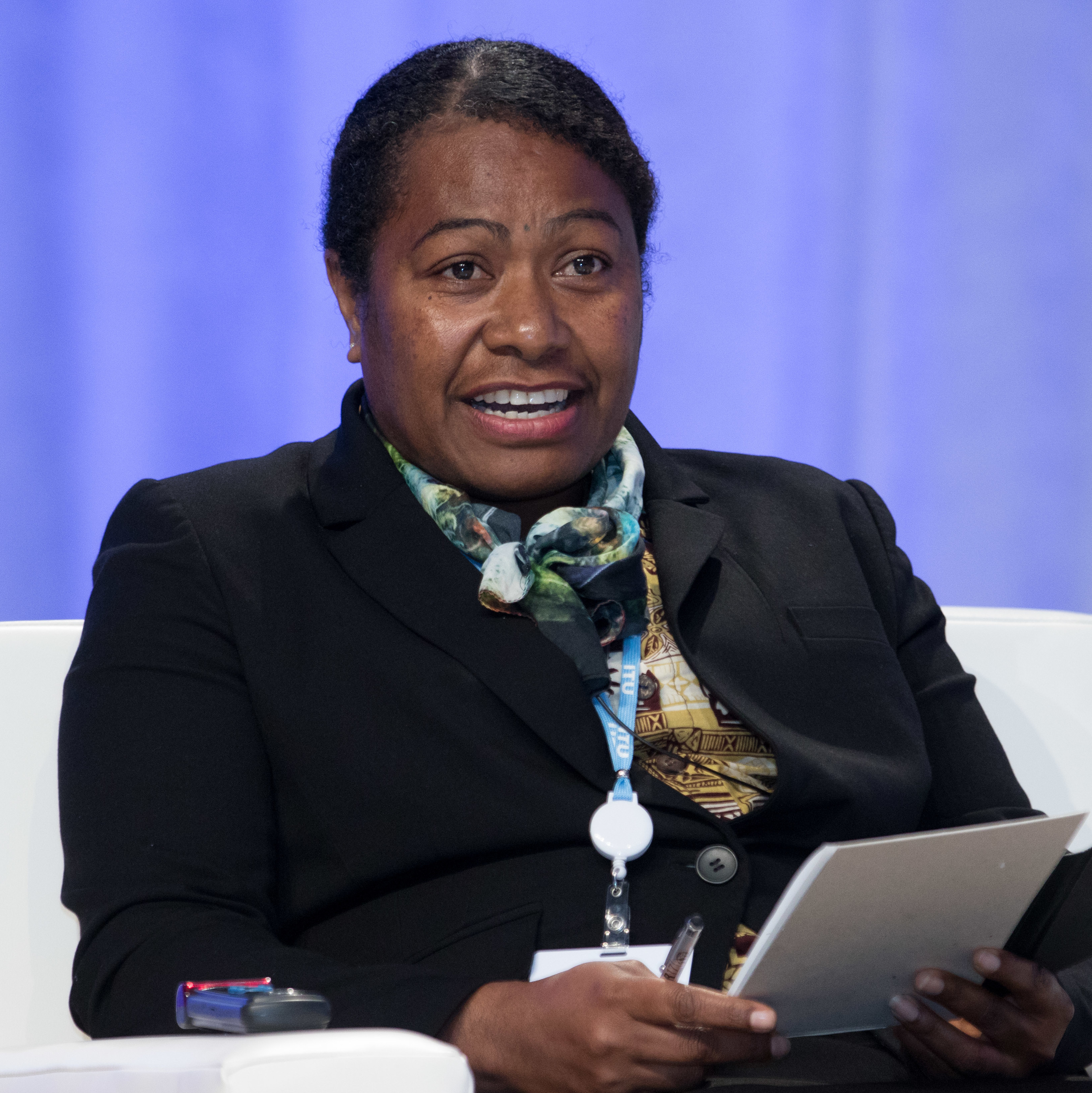
- in 2017
- Born: Vanuatu
- Education: MBA (University of the South Pacific).
- Occupation: Telecomms regulator

Dalsie Green Baniala is a Telecomms manager on Vanuatu. She is the Telecommunications and Radio communications Regulator for Vanuatu. Baniala was told that she was suspended by the Prime Minister but the courts over ruled the suspension.

== Life ==
Baniala was born in Vanuatu. In 1994 she left the Institut Nationale Technologie Vanuatu and went with a scholarship to the Solomon Island College of Education. In 1997 she had a diploma in Finance and Administration and by 2003 she had a degree. In 2008 she took a job at the Regulatory Office for Telecommunications on her home island. In 2010 she started a Master of Business Administration (MBA) at the University of the South Pacific.

She was the Telecommunications and Radiocommunications Regulator for Vanuatu. Vanuatu has a population of over 270,000 and its communications includes two mobile companies and four Internet service providers. She and her small office handled her county's Cyber Security and oversees consumer protection.

In 2017 she had a series of communications with the Prime Minister Charlot Salwai and he decided to suspend her from her role as regulator. Baniala appealed against this judgement and the Prime Minister's decision was quashed by the courts in June 2018. Baniala was able to continue in her work until the end of her three-year term in November 2018.
