= Bob Loughman =

Prime Minister of Vanuatu from 2020 to 2022

The Honourable Bob Loughman MP
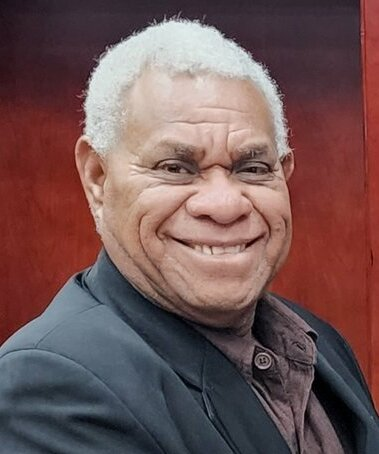
- Loughman in 2021

12th Prime Minister of Vanuatu
- In office 20 April 2020 – 4 November 2022
- President: Tallis Obed Moses; Nikenike Vurobaravu
- Deputy: Ishmael Kalsakau
- Preceded by: Charlot Salwai
- Succeeded by: Ishmael Kalsakau

Minister of Education
- In office 23 March 2013 – 11 June 2015
- Prime Minister: Moana Carcasses Kalosil; Joe Natuman
- Preceded by: Steven Kalsakau
- Succeeded by: Alfred Carlot

Personal details
- Born: 8 March 1961 (age 65) Tanna Island, New Hebrides (now Vanuatu)
- Party: Vanua'aku Pati

Bob Loughman Weibur (born 8 March 1961) is a Vanuatuan politician who served as Prime Minister of the Republic of Vanuatu between April 2020 and November 2022.

== Career ==
A member of the Vanua'aku Pati, he was first elected to Parliament as MP for Tanna in the general election on 6 July 2004. He was re-elected in 2008 and 2012. In March 2013, following a change in government, new Prime Minister Moana Carcasses appointed him Minister for Education.

Like other members of the Vanua'aku Pati, he crossed the floor on 15 May 2014 to help bring down the Carcasses government. New Prime Minister Joe Natuman maintained Loughman at his post as Minister for Education. He lost office on 11 June 2015 when the Natuman government was ousted in a motion of no confidence.

From 2018 he is the leader of the Vanua'aku Pati.

From 20 April 2020 to 4 November 2022, Loughman was in office as Prime Minister of Vanuatu.

=== Diplomatic conflict with Indonesia over West Papua ===
Loughman is an open critic of the Indonesian government's handling of the situation in the West Papua region, and supports the cause of the separatist West Papuans. During the 2020 United Nations General Assembly address, Loughman called out Indonesia over human rights violations in the region, prompting a response from Indonesian diplomats who labeled his speech as having an "excessive and unhealthy obsession" with the cause of West Papua and accused Loughman of meddling in Indonesia's internal affairs.

=== 2021 no-confidence vote ===
On 1 June 2021, the opposition filed a no-confidence vote against Loughman over alleged excessive spending in the situation of national crisis due to the COVID-19 pandemic in Vanuatu and the impact of Cyclone Harold last year, both things which have negatively impacted Vanuatu's economy. This became the first attempt at ousting him in a country where analysts say, no-confidence votes are commonplace.

Following the boycott of parliament by government MPs for three days, partly to avoid the motion of no confidence, speaker Gracia Shadrack declared on 8 June 2021 that the seats of Loughman and 17 other MPs were vacant. Supreme Court Justice Oliver Saksak put a stay on the speaker's ruling until a court could formally consider the dispute. On 18 June 2021, Saksak confirmed that 19 government MPs including Loughman had lost their seats. An appeal court also rejected the MPs case in July 2021 but the 19 MPs finally won in the appeal court on 28 October 2021, keeping their seats.

=== 2022 no-confidence motion ===
A new no-confidence motion was avoided in August 2022 by Vanuatu's president dissolving Parliament at short notice.

Political offices
Preceded by Charlot Salwai	Prime Minister of Vanuatu; 2020–2022	Succeeded by Ishmael Kalsakau
