= Eta Rory =

Vanuatuan politician

Eta Rory is a politician from Vanuatu. She was a member of the Vanuatu Parliament from 2008 to 2012 and briefly held two ministerial positions. At the time she was the only female member of the parliament.

== Early life ==
Eta Rory was born on 10 June 1965 on the island of Malakula, the second-largest island in Vanuatu, She married an agricultural extension officer and during his postings on Malakula, Espiritu Santo and Ambae islands she would teach at pre-school level in the communities in which he worked. She also worked with women through local churches, which led to her being proposed by the Bishop of Vanuatu, James Ligo, to run for Parliament for the Malakula constituency in the 2008 election. In the election she was one of two successful women candidates, the other being the incumbent, Isabelle Donald, but Donald was subsequently disqualified for bribing voters.

== Political life ==
Rory campaigned as a member of the Family First Party but transferred to the Vanuatu Republican Party in 2011 when she was given a ministerial appointment. In 2011, politics in Vanuatu was in a state of some chaos and for a time governments were changing almost monthly. In April, 2011 Rory was appointed as Minister of Agriculture but she lost this position in May when the premiership of Serge Vohor was voided by the Court of Appeal. On 20 June she was appointed Minister of Youth and Sports in a caretaker government under Edward Natapei that only lasted for six days and Rory returned to being a backbencher.

Rory was not re-elected in the 2012 election. During her time in parliament, she advocated for women's rights and children's rights. She campaigned to have the roads in Malakula upgraded and requested support for women handicraft producers to more easily sell their products. She was a member of the Parliamentary Committee on Economic Policy and the Parliamentary Committee on Social Policy. In June 2012 she headed the Vanuatu delegation to a conference in New Zealand on "Young People and Sexual reproductive health and rights".
