= Ministry of Justice (Vanuatu) =

The Ministry of Justice and Community Services of Vanuatu oversees or provides support to the following law-related agencies: the courts (Supreme, Magistrates, Island Courts), the tribunals, the correctional centres, child rights, family protection, disability advocacy and services, empowerment of women, and public prosecution and defense services as well as legal advice to the government. The ministry also supports agencies that review and create new laws and safeguard human rights.

== List of ministers (Post-1980 upon achieving independence) ==
- Walter Lini (1979-1988)
- Donald Kalpokas (1989-1990) [referred to as the Minister of Foreign Affairs and Justice]
- Sethy Regenvanu (1992-1996)
- Joe Natuman (1996) [referred to as the Minister for Judicial Services, Culture and Women's Affairs]
- Hilda Lini (1996) [referred to as the Minister of Justice, Culture and Women's Affairs] [1st female]
- Walter Lini (1996-1998) [referred to as the Minister of Justice, Culture and Women's Affairs and Minister of Justice and Internal Affairs]
- Vincent Boulekone (1999) [referred to as the Minister of Internal Affairs]
- Barnabas Tabi (2000-2002) [referred to as the Minister of Internal Affairs]
- Joe Natuman (2003) [referred to as the Minister of Internal Affairs]
- George Wells (2004-2006) [referred to as the Minister of Internal Affairs]
- Isabelle Donald (2006-2007)
- Joshua Kalsakau (2007-2008)
- Pakoa Kaltonga (2008-2010) [referred to as the Minister of Justice and Women's Affairs]
- Dunstan Hilton (2010)
- Alfred Carlot (2010)
- Yoan Simon (2010-2011)
- Ralph Regenvanu (2011-2012)
- Charlot Salwai (2012)
- Thomas Laken (2012-2013) [referred to as the Minister of Justice and Social Welfare]
- Maki Simelum (2013) [referred to as the Minister of Justice and Social Welfare]
- Silas Yatan (2013)
- Toara Daniel (2013)
- Jonas James (2013-2014)
- Christophe Emelee (2014)
- Alfred Carlot (2014-2015)
- Dunstan Hilton (2015)
- Robert Bohn Sikol (2015-2016)
- Ronald Warsal (2016-2018?)
- Don Ken Stephen (2018-2020)
- Esmon Saimon (2020-2022)
- John Still Tari Qetu (2022-2023)
- John Amos Nalau Masilaiwia (2023)
- James Bule (2023)
- John Amos Nalau Masilaiwia (2023-Incumbent)

== See also ==
- Justice ministry
- Politics of Vanuatu
