= Antoine Wright (politician) =

Vanuatuan politician (born 1960)

Antoine Wright MP

Minister for Youth and Sports
- In office 23 March 2013 – 15 May 2014
- Prime Minister: Moana Carcasses Kalosil
- Preceded by: Morkin Stevens
- Succeeded by: Don Ken

Member of Parliament for Port-Vila
- Incumbent
- Assumed office 30 October 2012

Personal details
- Party: Union of Moderate Parties

Antoine ("Tony") Wright, born 4 March 1960, is a Vanuatuan politician.

Having studied in Morocco and at the International School in Bordeaux in France, he worked at the French embassy in Vanuatu.

He was first elected to Parliament in the October 2012 general election, as MP for Port Vila, representing the Union of Moderate Parties - a francophone, generally conservative political movement. When Prime Minister Sato Kilman lost the confidence of Parliament on 23 October 2013, new Prime Minister Moana Carcasses Kalosil (of the Green Confederation) appointed Wright as Minister for Youth and Sports within his broad coalition government. In February 2014, he was one of several government MPs to defect to the Opposition, but then defected back to the government a few days later to retain his Cabinet position. He lost office when the Carcasses government was brought down by a motion of no confidence on 15 May 2014.

In June 2015, following a further change of government which returned Sato Kilman to power, Wright became a government backbencher. In October 2015, together with several other MPs, Wright was convicted of bribery by the Vanuatu Supreme Court. The court found that he had accepted a payment of 1,000,000 vatu from Moana Carcasses in return for support in the motion of no-confidence that brought the Kilman government to power.
