= Ishmael Kalsakau =

Prime Minister of Vanuatu from 2022 to 2023

The Honourable Ishmael Kalsakau MP
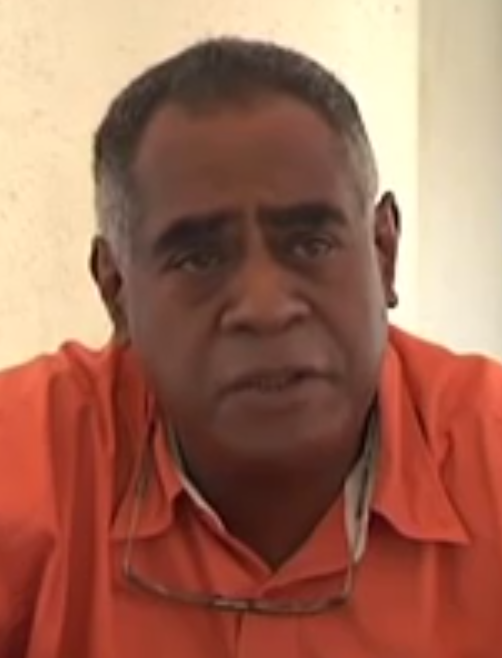
- Kalsakau in 2016

13th Prime Minister of Vanuatu
- In office 4 November 2022 – 4 September 2023
- President: Nikenike Vurobaravu
- Preceded by: Bob Loughman
- Succeeded by: Sato Kilman

Deputy Prime Minister of Vanuatu
- In office 21 April 2022 – 4 November 2022
- Prime Minister: Bob Loughman
- Preceded by: Jotham Napat
- Succeeded by: Sato Kilman

Minister of Internal Affairs of Vanuatu
- In office 21 April 2022 – 4 November 2022
- Prime Minister: Bob Loughman
- Preceded by: Andrew Napuat

Personal details
- Born: New Hebrides (now Vanuatu)
- Party: Union of Moderate Parties

Alatoi Ishmael Kalsakau is a Ni-Vanuatu politician who served as Prime Minister of the Republic of Vanuatu from 4 November 2022 until 4 September 2023. He is the head of the Union of Moderate Parties in Vanuatu.

== Career ==
In 2005, Kalsakau was appointed the Legal Counsel of MCA Vanuatu, the Vanuatu's component of the Millennium Challenge Corporation.

Kalsakau was Attorney General of Vanuatu, but resigned the post to contest parliamentary elections. After he lost, he returned to his post of Attorney General, raising concerns from Transparency International. Following the 2012 general election, he alleged that three ministers, including Moana Carcasses Kalosil, engaged in vote buying to secure several seats in Port Vila.

In 2014, Kalsakau was re-appointed Attorney General of the Government of Vanuatu.

Kalsakau was confirmed as Leader of the Opposition in February 2016.

Kalsakau became prime minister in 2022. In August 2023, he reshuffled his cabinet ahead of a confidence motion prompted by opposition to his security pact with Australia. On 16 August, he survived the confidence motion by one vote. The Supreme Court later ruled the motion successful and he was replaced by Sato Kilman on 4 September.

== Political positions ==
Kalsakau criticized a government proposal to introduce income tax to Vanuatu, leading a government spokesman to call on him to resign for "misleading statements".

Kalsakau has expressed skepticism regarding increased Chinese involvement in Vanuatu, as well as a lack of transparency regarding loans from China.

== Family ==
Two of Kalsakau's brothers — Ephraim Kalsakau and Joshua Kalsakau — were also elected as Members of Parliament in 2016. His father was First Chief Minister George Kalsakau, who was involved in negotiating Vanuatu's independence from France and the United Kingdom.

Political offices
Preceded by Bob Loughman	Prime Minister of Vanuatu; 2022–present	Incumbent
