= Ministry of Finance and Economic Management (Vanuatu) =

Cabinet ministry of the government of Vanuatu

Ministry of Finance and Economic Management of Vanuatu
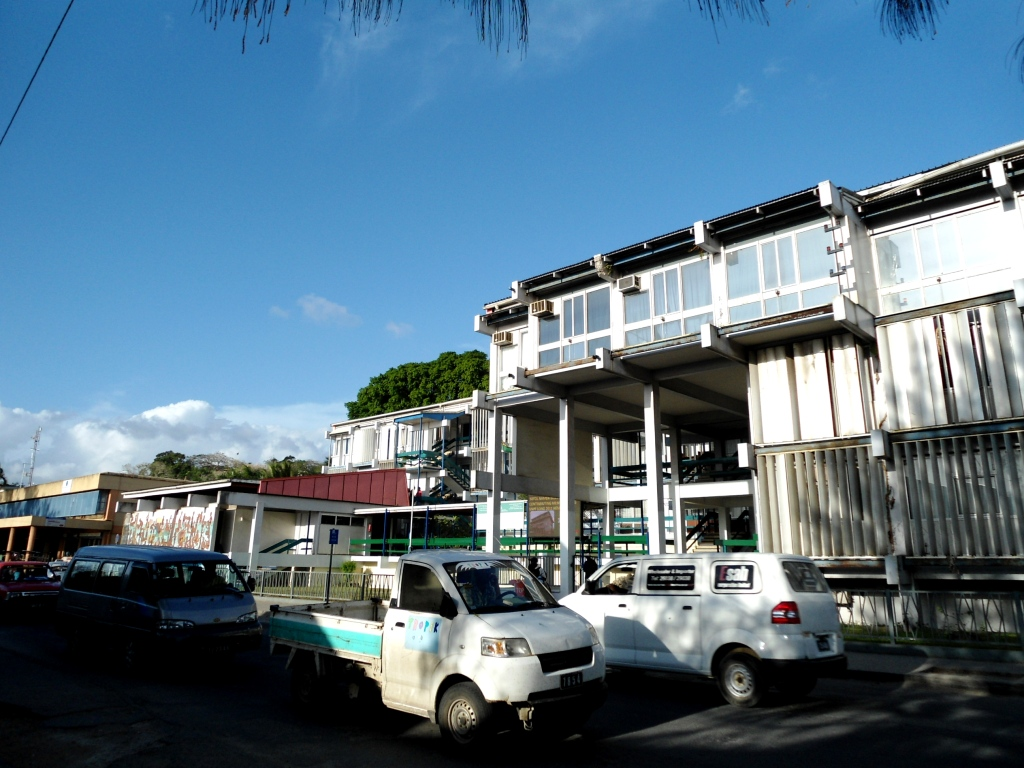

Agency overview
- Formed: 1980
- Jurisdiction: Government of Vanuatu
- Headquarters: Port Vila
- Agency executive: Johnny Koanapo Rasou, Minister

The Ministry of Finance and Economic Management is a cabinet ministry of the government of Vanuatu responsible for overseeing the nation's public finances.

== Ministers of Finance ==
- Kalpokor Kalsakau, 1980-1987
- Sela Molisa, 1988-1991
- Sethy Regenvanu, 1991
- Willie Jimmy, 1991-1992
- Onneyn Tahi, 1992
- Willie Jimmy, 1993-1996
- Barak Sope, 1996
- Shem Naukaut, 1996-1997
- Willie Jimmy, 1997
- Vincent Boulekone, 1997-1998
- Sela Molisa, 1998-1999
- Iatika Morking Stephen, 1999-2001
- Joe Bomal Carlo, 2001-2002
- Sela Molisa, 2002-2004
- Jimmy Nicklam, 2004
- Moana Carcasses Kalosil, 2004-2005
- Willie Jimmy, 2005-2008
- Sela Molisa, 2008-2010
- Moana Carcasses Kalosil, 2010-2011
- Bakoa Kaltongga, 2011
- Moana Carcasses Kalosil, 2011
- Sela Molisa, 2011
- Moana Carcasses Kalosil, 2011-2012
- Charlot Salwai, 2012-2013
- Willie Jimmy, 2013
- Maki Simelum, 2013-2015
- Willie Jimmy, 2015-2016
- Gaetan Pikinoune, 2016-2020
- Johnny Koanapo Rasou, 2020-2022
- John Dahmasing Salong, 2022-2023
- Johnny Koanapo Rasou, 2023-

== See also ==
- Reserve Bank of Vanuatu
- Finance ministry
- Economy of Vanuatu
- Government of Vanuatu
