= John Still Tari Qetu =

Vanuatuan politician

The Honourable John Still Tari Qetu MP

MP for Ambae
- In office 2020–2022

Personal details
- Born: 7 July 1983 (age 41)
- Political party: National United Party

John Still Tari Qetu is a Vanuatuan politician and a member of the Parliament of Vanuatu from Ambae as a member of the National United Party.

He was Minister of Justice and Community Services from 2022 to 2023. He has also served as the Minister for Health.
