= Jotham Napat =

Ni-Vanuatu politician (born 1972)

The Honourable Jotham Napat MP
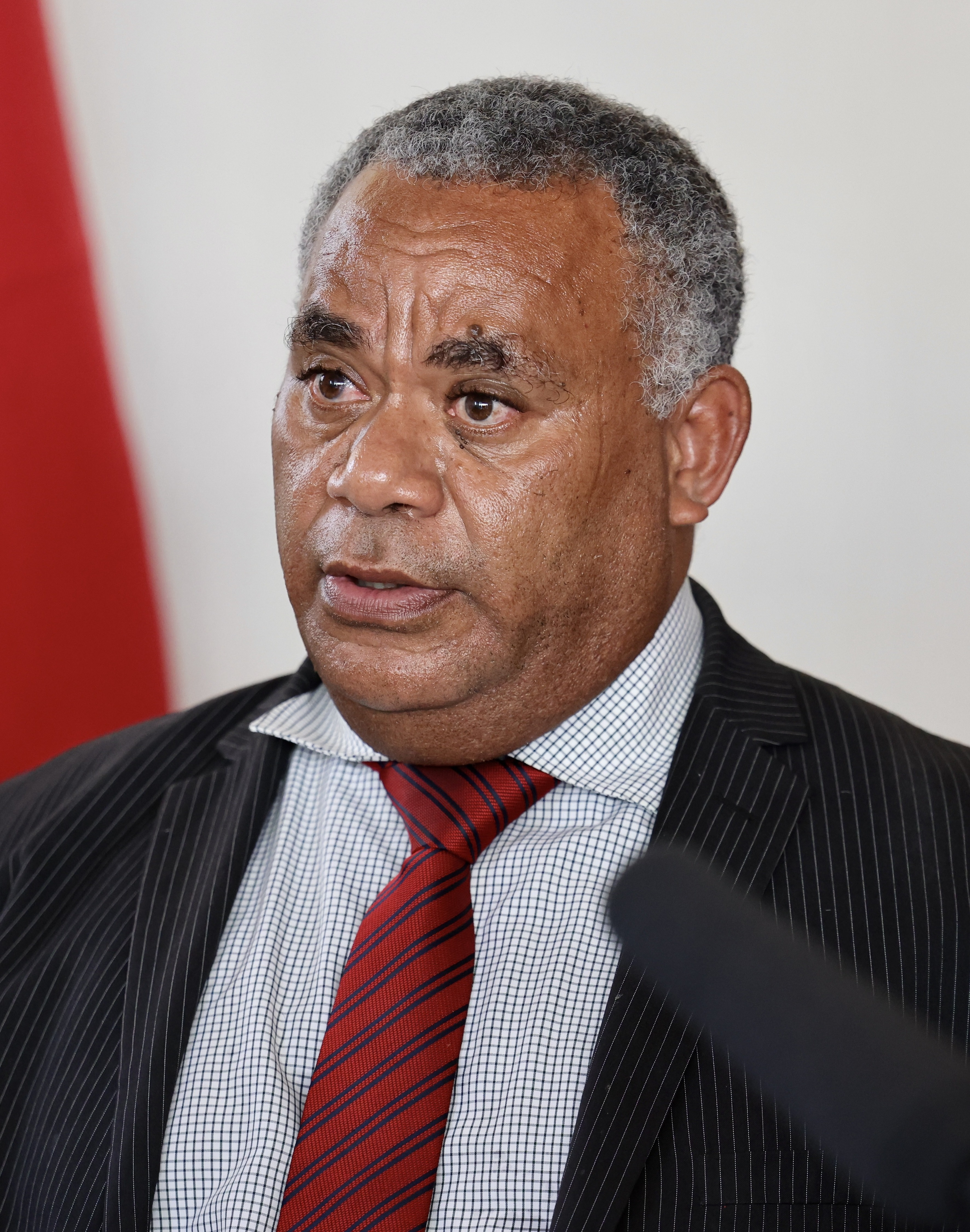
- Napat in 2022

Prime Minister of Vanuatu
- Incumbent
- Assumed office 11 February 2025
- President: Nikenike Vurobaravu
- Preceded by: Charlot Salwai

Minister of Foreign Affairs and Trade
- In office 4 November 2022 – 8 April 2023
- Prime Minister: Ishmael Kalsakau
- Preceded by: Marc Ati
- Succeeded by: Matai Seremaiah

MP for Tanna Constituency
- In office 2016–2022

Personal details
- Born: 7 August 1972 (age 54) Tanna, New Hebrides
- Party: Leaders Party of Vanuatu
- Spouse: Lettis Napat

Jotham Napat (born 7 August 1972) is a Vanuatu politician and a member of the Parliament of Vanuatu from Tanna Constituency as a member of the Leaders Party of Vanuatu. In February 2025 he was elected Prime Minister of Vanuatu following the 2025 Vanuatuan general election.

Napat previously worked as a meteorologist and served as chair of the National Disaster Committee following Cyclone Pam in 2015. He has been a member of the Parliament of Vanuatu since 2016.
