= Willie Jimmy =

Vanuatu politician

Willie Edward Jimmy Tapangararua, often just referred to as Willie Jimmy (born 4 March 1960), is a Vanuatuan politician with the National United Party.

== Career ==
Jimmy has served as Vanuatu's Minister of Finance and/or trade on several occasions. He was Minister of Finance from 1991-1992, 1993-1996, 1997, 2005-2008, 2013, and 2015-2016.

In 2003, he was nominated to be the country's Deputy Prime Minister, but at the last minute was switched to the Minister of Trade position, so that the NUP president could be nominated in his place, as part of a coalition-building strategy. He would go on to play a role in relations with China as his country's first ambassador to China, appointed in 2009.

On 23 March 2013, new Prime Minister Moana Carcasses Kalosil appointed him Minister of Finance. On 10 May, Carcasses sacked him, "amid reports the veteran politician was in talks with the opposition about a possible defection", which Jimmy denied. Maki Simelum, who had been Minister for Justice, replaced him, while Silas Yatan (Greens, MP for Tanna) was given the Justice portfolio. Jimmy joined the Opposition. On 26 February 2014, facing defections to the Opposition, Carcasses offered Cabinet positions to Opposition MPs, to shore up his parliamentary majority. Jimmy was one of those who defected to Carcasses' government for a Cabinet job; he was appointed Minister for Trade - replacing Daniel Toara, who was dismissed to make room for him. Jimmy lost office when the Carcasses government was brought down by a motion of no confidence on 15 May 2014.

On 11 June 2015, three government MPs crossed the floor, enabling the Opposition to oust Joe Natuman's government through a motion of no confidence. Sato Kilman formed the new government and re-appointed Jimmy to the position of Minister of Finance. On 2 September, Jimmy pleaded guilty in court to charges of corruption for having taken bribes. Jimmy admitted to receiving 1,000,000 vatu from Moana Carcasses in return for support in the motion of no-confidence that brought the Kilman government to power. The 15 other MPs accused of bribery pleaded not guilty, but all but one of them were subsequently convicted.

== Other ==
Jean Paul Virelala of the Ministry of Education filed a defamation suit against Jimmy, CEO Terry Kerr of Air Vanuatu, and the Vanuatu Daily Post over 2007 comments by the former two published in the latter organ; the newspaper quoted Jimmy as saying about Virelala's consultancy work for the airline that "I am concerned that Mr. Virelala will be wanting to get back at the current management for his dismissal and it will create problems." However, the suit was thrown out in October 2010.

In November 2014, he stated publicly that like many indigenous Melanesians, he believes in witchcraft, and that the practice of witchcraft should be punished with the death penalty.
