= Charlot Salwai =

Prime Minister of Vanuatu (2016–2020; 2023–2025)

The Honourable Charlot Salwai MP
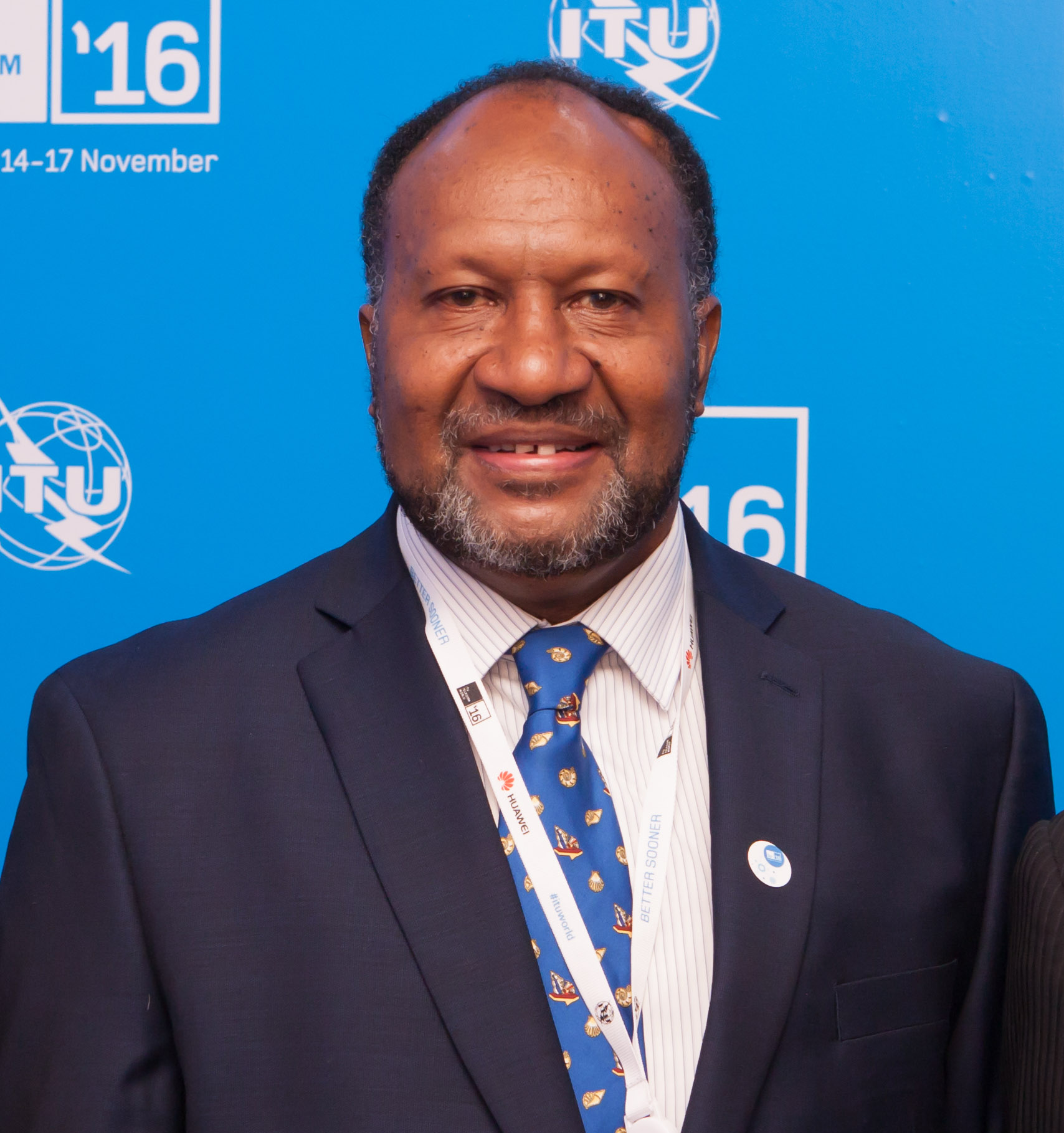
- Salwai in 2016

Prime Minister of Vanuatu
- In office 6 October 2023 – 11 February 2025
- President: Nikenike Vurobaravu
- Preceded by: Sato Kilman
- Succeeded by: Jotham Napat
- In office 11 February 2016 – 20 April 2020
- President: Baldwin Lonsdale; Esmon Saimon (Acting); Tallis Obed Moses
- Deputy: Jotham Napat
- Preceded by: Sato Kilman
- Succeeded by: Bob Loughman

MP for Pentecost
- In office 2 May 2002 – 8 October 2021
- Succeeded by: Sumptoh Blaise Tabisurin

Personal details
- Born: 24 April 1963 (age 63) Pentecost Island, New Hebrides
- Party: Reunification Movement for Change
- Spouse: Marie-Justine Salwai
- Occupation: Accountant
- Profession: Politician

Charlot Salwai Tabimasmas (born 24 April 1963) is a Ni-Vanuatu politician, former accountant, and political advisor. He was the prime minister of Vanuatu from 2016 to 2020 and again from 2023 to 2025. He is the leader of the Reunification of Movements for Change (RMC), which is part of the Unity for Change bloc.

== Biography ==
Born in 1963 on Pentecost Island, Salwai learned to speak French as a teenager. He attended Bourail College to obtain his General Education Certificate, Bourail Technical College to obtain his Technical Education Certificate, and Lycée Blaise Pascal in Nouméa for his Baccalauréat technologique G2.

Salwai is a Protestant Christian and is able to speak some English. In the summer of 2017, he appeared in South Korea at the RUTC "World Remnant Conference".

Salwai had previously served as Minister for Trade and Industries, Minister for Lands and Natural Resources, Minister for Education, Minister of Justice (2012), Minister for Finance and Economic Management (2012–2013), and Minister of Internal Affairs. He has also served as Chairman of the Public Accounts Committee, Leader of the Opposition Whip, and Deputy Opposition Leader.

On 11 February 2016, he was elected prime minister of Vanuatu in the 2016 Vanuatuan general election. In August 2016, he was re-elected as leader of the RMC. In late November 2016 Salwai survived an attempt at a motion of no-confidence, with MPs being divided on procedural points regarding the motion and attachment of a summons. In August 2020, Salwai, former cabinet ministers Matai Seremaiah and Jerome Ludvaune and former MP Tom Korr were committed to the Supreme Court on charges of bribery and corruption over allegations he had bribed MPs who had signed the motion. Salwai was also charged with perjury.

Salwai stood trial from 23 November 2020, charged with 10 counts of bribery and corruption. He and his former Minister of Health were acquitted of bribery on 8 December. On 16 December 2020, Salwai was convicted of perjury and given a suspended sentence. He was pardoned by the President of Vanuatu, Tallis Obed Moses, in September 2021, which restored his eligibility to run for public office.

On 6 October 2023, Salwai was elected prime minister following the ousting of Sato Kilman in a vote of no confidence.

Political offices
Preceded by Sato Kilman	Prime Minister of Vanuatu; 2016–2020	Succeeded by Bob Loughman
Preceded by Sato Kilman	Prime Minister of Vanuatu; 2023–2025	Succeeded by Jotham Napat
