= George Wells (Vanuatuan politician) =

Vanuatuan politician and Member of Parliament

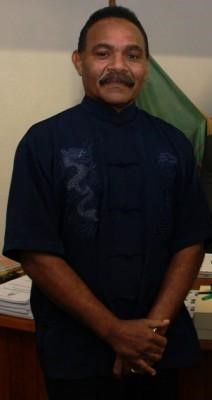
Wells in 2010.

George Andre Wells was a Vanuatuan politician and Member of Parliament. He was a member of the National United Party. Wells served as the Foreign Minister of Vanuatu, as well as the Internal Affairs Minister until 2007.

== Speaker of Parliament ==
Wells was elected Speaker of the Parliament of Vanuatu on three separate occasions:

- September 2008 – June 2009
- January 2010 – December 2010
- November 2012 – April 2013^{.}
