= Prime Minister of Vanuatu =

Head of government

- Praem Minista blong Vanuatu (Bislama); Premier Ministre de Vanuatu (French)
- Coat of arms of Vanuatu

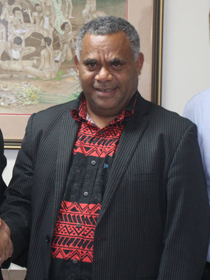
- Incumbent; Jotham Napat since 11 February 2025
- Term length: for as long as the Prime Minister has the confidence of Parliament
- Constituting instrument: Constitution of Vanuatu
- Formation: 30 July 1980
- First holder: Walter Lini
- Salary: VT 67,846 weekly (US$32,395 annually)
- Website: ogcio.gov.vu

The prime minister of Vanuatu is the head of government of the Republic of Vanuatu.

The office of prime minister was created under the Constitution of Vanuatu upon the country's independence in 1980, with independence campaigner Walter Lini becoming the first office-holder. The position is sometimes seen as a continuation of the older office of Chief Minister, which existed before Vanuatu obtained its independence. According to the Constitution, the prime minister is elected by the Parliament, of which s/he must be a member. The prime minister directly appoints or dismisses members of the Council of Ministers (cabinet ministers).

So far 13 men have served as Prime Minister of Vanuatu, some on multiple occasions.

The current prime minister is Jotham Napat from the Leaders Party of Vanuatu, since 11 February 2025.

== Disputes ==
In November 2009, Prime Minister Edward Natapei was briefly declared by the Speaker to have lost his seat over a procedural technicality. The courts invalidated the ruling, and Natapei regained his seat, and thus the premiership.

Serge Vohor's fourth term in office, from April to May 2011, is included in the list below, although his election to the premiership was voided as unconstitutional by the Court of Appeal on 13 May, on the grounds that he had been elected only by a majority of members of Parliament (26 out of 52), not by an absolute majority. Ralph Regenvanu, who regained his position as Minister for Justice after the annulment of Vohor's premiership, stated: "Prime Minister Serge Vohor and his cabinet are illegal, null and void and were never the government of the country."

Similarly, Sato Kilman's term is included although it was also voided, by a ruling from Chief Justice Vincent Lunabek on 16 June 2011, finding that Kilman's election in December 2010 had not been in conformity with the requirements for a secret parliamentary ballot set out in article 41 of the Constitution. Thus, following Edward Natapei's ousting in a valid motion of no confidence in December 2010, Vanuatu had no lawfully constituted government until Natapei was restored in June with instructions from the court to convene Parliament for the election of a prime minister. This was done on 26 June, resulting in Sato Kilman's election to the premiership by Parliament – his first legally recognised term as prime minister.

== List of prime ministers ==
No.	Portrait	Name (Birth–Death)	Term of office			Political party	Elected	Government
No.	Portrait	Name (Birth–Death)	Took office	Left office	Time in office	Political party	Elected	Government
1		Walter Lini (1941–1999)	30 July 1980	6 September 1991	11 years, 38 days	Vanua'aku Pati	1983; 1987	Lini I–II–III
–		Donald Kalpokas (1943–2019); Acting	6 September 1991	16 December 1991	101 days	Vanua'aku Pati	–	Lini III
2		Maxime Carlot Korman (born 1941)	16 December 1991	21 December 1995	4 years, 5 days	Union of Moderate Parties	1991	Korman I
3		Serge Vohor (1955–2024)	21 December 1995	23 February 1996 (Vote of no confidence)	64 days	Union of Moderate Parties	1995	Vohor I
(2)		Maxime Carlot Korman (born 1941)	23 February 1996	30 September 1996 (Vote of no confidence)	220 days	Union of Moderate Parties	—	Korman II
(3)		Serge Vohor (1955–2024)	30 September 1996	30 March 1998	1 year, 181 days	Union of Moderate Parties	—	Vohor II
4		Donald Kalpokas (1943–2019)	30 March 1998	25 November 1999	1 year, 240 days	Vanua'aku Pati	1998	Kalpokas
5		Barak Sopé (born 1955)	25 November 1999	13 April 2001 (Resigned)	1 year, 139 days	Melanesian Progressive Party	—	Sopé
6		Edward Natapei (1954–2015)	13 April 2001	29 July 2004	3 years, 107 days	Vanua'aku Pati	2002	Natapei I–II
(3)		Serge Vohor (1955–2024)	29 July 2004	11 December 2004 (Vote of no confidence)	135 days	Union of Moderate Parties	2004	Vohor III
7		Ham Lini (1951–2025)	11 December 2004	22 September 2008	3 years, 286 days	National United Party	—	Lini
(6)		Edward Natapei (1954–2015)	22 September 2008	27 November 2009 (Removed)	1 year, 66 days	Vanua'aku Pati	2008	Natapei III
–		Serge Vohor (1955–2024); Acting	27 November 2009	5 December 2009	8 days	Union of Moderate Parties	—	Natapei III
(6)		Edward Natapei (1954–2015)	5 December 2009 (Reinstated)	2 December 2010 (Vote of no confidence)	362 days	Vanua'aku Pati	—	Natapei III
8		Sato Kilman (born 1957)	2 December 2010	24 April 2011 (Vote of no confidence)	143 days	People's Progressive Party	—	Kilman I
(3)		Serge Vohor (1955–2024)	24 April 2011	13 May 2011 (Removed)	19 days	Union of Moderate Parties	—	Vohor IV
(8)		Sato Kilman (born 1957)	13 May 2011	16 June 2011 (Removed)	34 days	People's Progressive Party	—	Kilman II
–		Edward Natapei (1954–2015); Acting	16 June 2011	26 June 2011	10 days	Vanua'aku Pati	—	Interim
(8)		Sato Kilman (born 1957)	26 June 2011 (Reinstated)	23 March 2013 (Resigned)	1 year, 270 days	People's Progressive Party	2012	Kilman III–IV
9		Moana Carcasses Kalosil (born 1963)	23 March 2013	15 May 2014 (Vote of no confidence)	1 year, 53 days	Green Confederation	—	Carcasses
10		Joe Natuman (born 1952)	15 May 2014	11 June 2015 (Vote of no confidence)	1 year, 27 days	Vanua'aku Pati	—	Natuman
(8)		Sato Kilman (born 1957)	11 June 2015	11 February 2016	245 days	People's Progressive Party	—	Kilman V
11		Charlot Salwai (born 1963)	11 February 2016	20 April 2020	4 years, 69 days	Reunification Movement for Change	2016	Salwai
12		Bob Loughman (born 1961)	20 April 2020	4 November 2022	2 years, 198 days	Vanua'aku Pati	2020	Loughman
13		Ishmael Kalsakau (born 19??)	4 November 2022	4 September 2023	304 days	Union of Moderate Parties	2022	Kalsakau
(8)		Sato Kilman (born 1957)	4 September 2023	6 October 2023	32 days	People's Progressive Party	—	Kilman VI
(11)		Charlot Salwai (born 1963)	6 October 2023	11 February 2025	1 year, 128 days	Reunification Movement for Change	—	Salwai II
14		Jotham Napat (born 1972)	11 February 2025	Incumbent	1 year, 280 days	Leaders Party of Vanuatu	2025	Napat

== See also ==
- Politics of Vanuatu
- President of Vanuatu
- List of resident commissioners of the New Hebrides
