= Marcellino Pipite =

Vanuatuan politician and former school administration

Marcellino Pipite is a ni-Vanuatu politician and former school administration, who was first elected to Parliament in 2004. He was the foreign minister of Vanuatu from November 2004 until December 2004, in the government of Serge Vohor. He was previously the minister for comprehensive reform. He lost his position in the cabinet in December 2004 when the Vohor government fell.

He was elected as the Speaker of the Parliament of Vanuatu on 16 June 2015, and served until October 2015.

On October 10, 2015, while serving as acting President, he pardoned himself and 13 other MPs who the Supreme Court had found guilty of bribery. President Baldwin Lonsdale, returning to Vanuatu hours after Pipite's pardon has been issued, declared that nobody is above the law and revoked the pardon, a decision upheld by the Supreme Court of Vanuatu. Pipite and 10 of the other MPs faced charges of conspiracy to pervert the course of justice. Sentencing on the bribery charges went ahead and Pipite was jailed for 3 years, together with most of the other convicted MPs.
