= Serge Vohor =

Vanuatuan politician (1955–2024)

His Excellency Serge Vohor
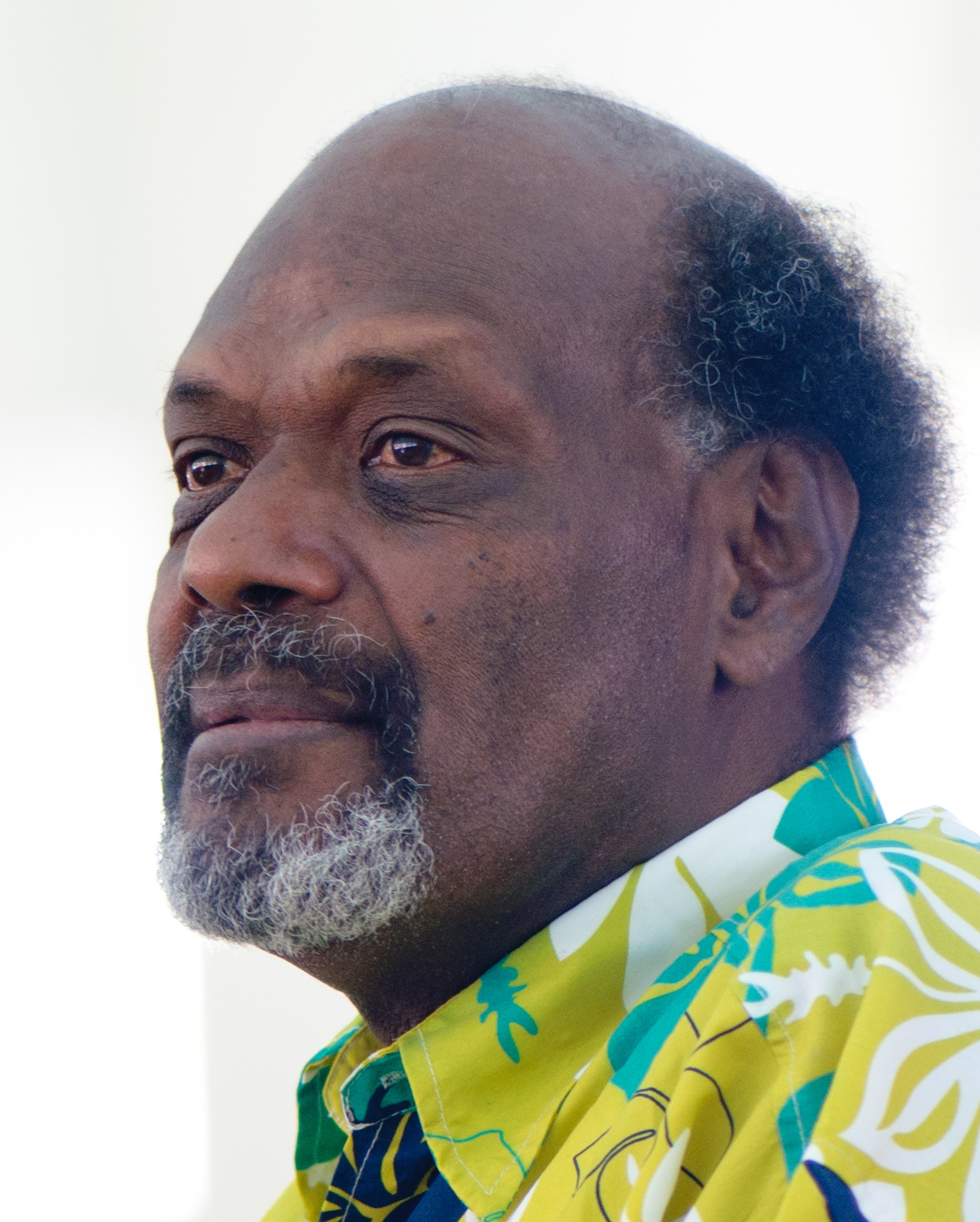
- Vohor in 2012

4th Prime Minister of Vanuatu
- In office 24 April 2011 – 13 May 2011
- President: Iolu Abil
- Preceded by: Sato Kilman
- Succeeded by: Sato Kilman
- In office 27 November 2009 – 5 December 2009 (Acting)
- President: Iolu Abil
- Preceded by: Edward Natapei
- Succeeded by: Edward Natapei
- In office 29 July 2004 – 11 December 2004
- President: Josias Moli (Acting); Kalkot Mataskelekele
- Preceded by: Edward Natapei
- Succeeded by: Ham Lini
- In office 30 September 1996 – 30 March 1998
- President: Jean Marie Leye Lenelgau
- Preceded by: Maxime Carlot Korman
- Succeeded by: Donald Kalpokas
- In office 21 December 1995 – 23 February 1996
- President: Jean Marie Leye Lenelgau
- Preceded by: Maxime Carlot Korman
- Succeeded by: Maxime Carlot Korman

Personal details
- Born: 23 April 1955 Port Olry, Espiritu Santo, New Hebrides
- Died: 22 November 2024 (aged 69) Espiritu Santo, Vanuatu
- Party: Pikinini blong Graon (2022–2024)
- Other political affiliations: Union of Moderate Parties (1988–2022)

Rialuth Serge Vohor (23 April 1955 – 22 November 2024) was a Vanuatuan politician. He hailed from the largest island of Vanuatu, Espiritu Santo, from Port Olry.

Vohor was a member of the Union of Moderate Parties, a centrist political party, until 2022. When his party came to power in 1991, Vohor became foreign minister of Vanuatu for the first of three times, until 1993. Vohor has been Prime Minister four times, from December 1995 to February 1996; from September 1996 to March 1998; from 28 July 2004, to 11 December 2004; and from 24 April 2011 to 13 May 2011. The latter, brief term was however voided by the Court of Appeal, deeming his election unconstitutional as he had been elected only by a majority of Members of Parliament (26 out of 52), not by an absolute majority.

In October 2015, Vohor was one of 15 MPs to be convicted of bribery by the Vanuatu Supreme Court and was jailed for three years. Vohor was Minister for Foreign Affairs in the Kilman government at the time of his conviction.

== Second term as prime minister and aftermath ==
In October 1996, during his second term as prime minister, he was abducted along with President Jean-Marie Léyé by members of the paramilitary Vanuatu Mobile Force, "disgruntled over a pay dispute". Both men were soon released unharmed. In 1997, while still serving as prime minister, he was implicated in a scheme to sell Vanuatuan passports to foreigners, and the Office of the Vanuatu Ombudsman recommended that he resign from his post.

After the 1998 parliamentary elections the Union of Moderate Parties could not form a coalition government, but Vohor still served as a prominent member of coalition governments led by other parties much of the time, serving as foreign minister again from 1999 until 2001. His party did not regain power in the 2002 parliamentary elections, but Vohor served as foreign minister for a third time from 2002 until 2003.

== Third term as prime minister ==
In the parliamentary elections of 2004, the Union of Moderate Parties lost several seats. However, Vohor managed to form a coalition including independents and members of other parties to be elected Prime Minister. Vohor was elected Prime Minister by the Parliament with 28 votes, with his opponent, Ham Lini receiving 24. The following month, Vohor formed a national unity government with Lini as deputy prime minister.

While abroad, Vohor was charged with contempt for comments he had made in parliament about Chief Justice Vincent Lunabek, but in September 2004 the Supreme Court threw out the charges on the grounds that Vohor had not been given the proper chance to defend himself in court, and that, furthermore, his comments were protected by parliamentary privilege.

Vohor gained international attention when, on 3 November 2004, while on a secret visit to Taipei, he established diplomatic relations with the Republic of China (Taiwan) without approval from the Council of Ministers. The Council of Ministers voted to void the move and asserted Vanuatu's continued recognition of the People's Republic of China under its terms of the One-China policy. For weeks, both the ROC and PRC had diplomatic missions in Vanuatu with disagreement in the government over which government to recognize. On 1 December, Vohor punched (or pushed) the shoulder of the new ambassador from Beijing, Bao Shusheng, after being approached to explain why the flag of the Republic of China was still flying over a hotel in Port Vila. After 16 members of parliament who had supported Vohor joined the opposition, depriving him of a majority and leaving him with 15 out of 52 seats, the opposition tried to hold a no-confidence vote against Vohor. Vohor attempted to prevent the vote in court, claiming that a new constitutional amendment barred no-confidence votes against a prime minister during his first year in office, but the Supreme Court ruled against him on 7 December, saying that the vote could go ahead because the new amendment had not yet been approved by referendum. Vohor then took the matter to the Court of Appeal, but it also ruled against him; he was defeated in the no-confidence vote and replaced by Ham Lini.

== Later career ==
After then Vohor was effectively the leader of the opposition. In March 2006, Vohor led an attempt to depose Lini through a no confidence vote, focusing on accusing Lini of weakness. However, the vote was defeated as not enough Parliament members who had supported the government defected.

On 27 July 2007, Vohor, who was serving as Minister of Public Utilities, allegedly assaulted an official from the Finance Ministry due to his pay being delayed. Despite this allegation, there was no evidence to substantiate the assault ever taking place. In a cabinet reshuffle a few days later, he was one of several ministers dismissed from the government. Vohor said that one reason the UMP was being excluded from the government was because of its strength, and said that the party would try to return to the government.

After the 2 September 2008 general elections Vohor and his Union of Moderate Parties initially aligned itself with the opposition block which gave its support to Vanuatu Republican Party's Maxime Carlot Korman for the post of Prime Minister.

When a motion of no confidence was tabled against new Prime Minister Edward Natapei, Serge Vohor and his MPs initially supported the no confidence motion; however, he eventually withdrew his signature to be in Natapei's government as its new Minister of Infrastructure and Public Utilities.

== Fourth term as prime minister ==
On 24 April 2011 (Easter Sunday), Prime Minister Sato Kilman was narrowly ousted by a parliamentary vote of no confidence, by twenty-six votes to twenty-five. Usually, the opposition, led by Edward Natapei, had not fielded a candidate to succeed him. Parliament thus elected Serge Vohor to the post.

His election was declared invalid on 13 May 2011, as he had been elected only by a relative majority in Parliament, not an absolute one.

== Subsequent career ==
On 23 March 2013, new Prime Minister Moana Carcasses Kalosil appointed him Minister for Health. He lost office when the Carcasses government was brought down by a motion of no confidence on 15 May 2014.

In June 2015, following a further change of government, Vohor became Minister of Foreign Affairs in the government of Sato Kilman.

In October 2015, Serge Vohor, together with several other MPs, was convicted of bribery by the Vanuatu Supreme Court. Vohor was found to have accepted 1,000,000 vatu from Moana Carcasses MP, in return for support in a motion of no-confidence against the government of Joe Natuman. At one point during the trial, Vohor attacked a photographer outside the court house. Vohor was sentenced to three years imprisonment for his involvement in the bribery scandal. He was also convicted for conspiring to pervert the course of justice. He served 18 months in jail. He was pardoned by the President of Vanuatu, Tallis Obed Moses, in September 2021, which restores his eligibility to run for public office again.

In August 2022, he launched a leadership bid once again for the UMP, this time losing to Ishmael Kalsakau by a vote of 45 delegates to 22. After his defeat, Vohor left the party after more than 30 years and formed a new party called the Pikinini blong Graon (Children of the Land) Movement in September.

== Death ==
Vohor died on Espiritu Santo on 22 November 2024, aged 69.

Political offices
Preceded by Maxime Carlot Korman	Prime Minister of Vanuatu; 1995–1996	Succeeded by Maxime Carlot Korman
Preceded by Maxime Carlot Korman	Prime Minister of Vanuatu; 1996–1998	Succeeded by Donald Kalpokas
Preceded by Edward Natapei	Prime Minister of Vanuatu; 2004	Succeeded by Ham Lini
Preceded by Edward Natapei	Prime Minister of Vanuatu; Acting; 2009	Succeeded by Edward Natapei
Preceded by Sato Kilman	Prime Minister of Vanuatu; 2011	Succeeded by Sato Kilman
