= Joe Natuman =

Prime Minister of Vanuatu from 2014 to 2015

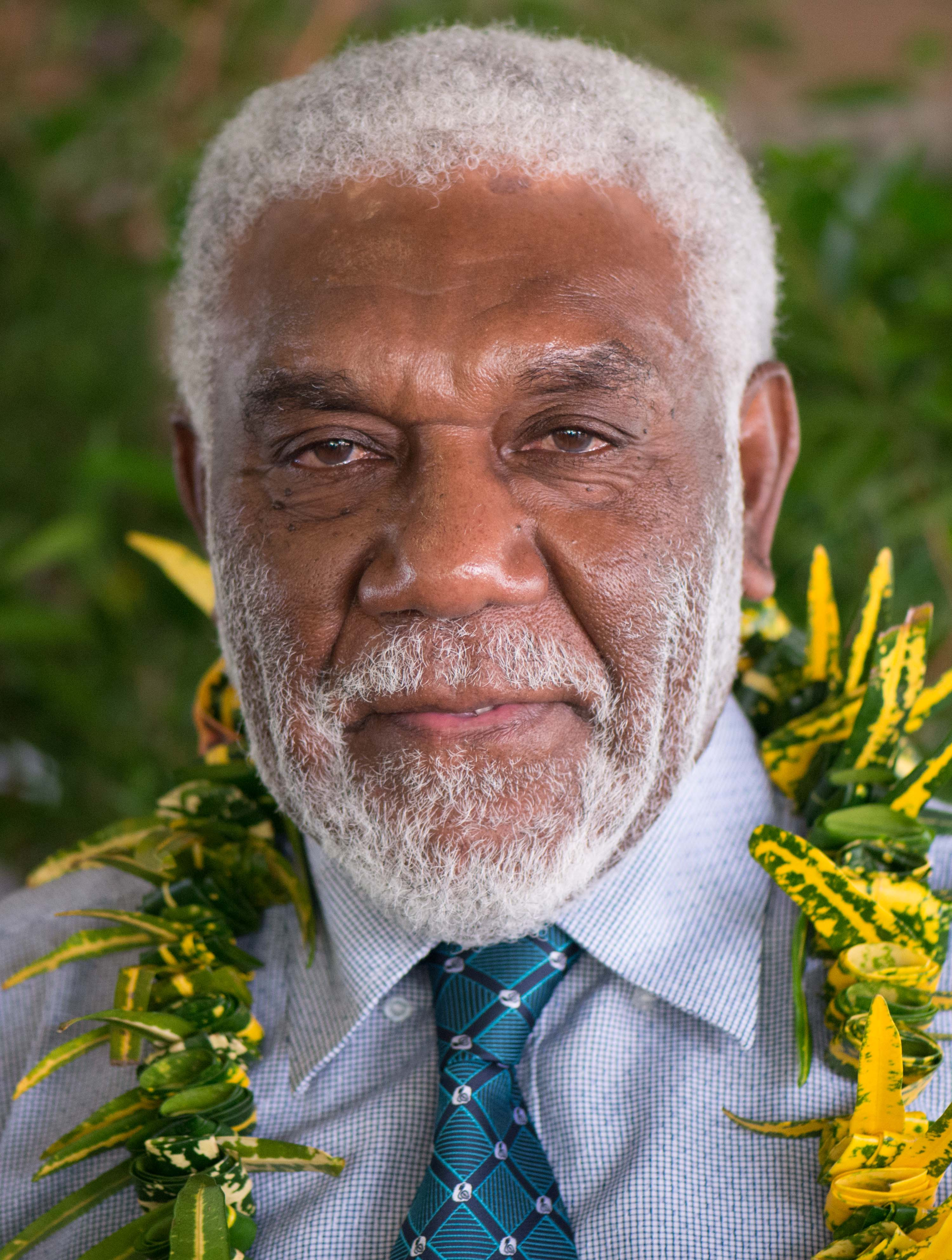
- Natuman in 2014

Prime Minister of Vanuatu
- In office 15 May 2014 – 11 June 2015
- President: Iolu Abil; Philip Boedoro (Acting); Baldwin Lonsdale
- Preceded by: Moana Carcasses Kalosil
- Succeeded by: Sato Kilman

Personal details
- Born: 24 November 1952 (age 73) Tanna, New Hebrides (now Vanuatu)
- Party: Vanua'aku Pati
- Education: University of the South Pacific

Joe Natuman (born 24 November 1952) is a Vanuatuan politician of the Vanua'aku Pati and former Prime Minister of Vanuatu.

He is a graduate of the University of the South Pacific, and was also an exchange student at the University of Papua New Guinea.

In the 1980s, he worked in the highest ranks of the civil service, culminating with the position of First Secretary to the Prime Minister's Office from 1987 to 1991, at the time of Prime Minister Walter Lini. He then worked as assistant registrar at the University of the South Pacific in Suva, Fiji, until 1995.

He entered national politics when he was elected MP for Tanna, representing the Vanua'aku Pati, in the 1995 general election. He has been continuously re-elected since.

From 1996 to 2008, he served in the following positions in successive governments:

- Minister for Judicial Services, Culture and Women's Affairs in 1996
- Minister for Lands, Energy, Geology and Mines in 1997
- Minister for Education in 1998
- Minister for Internal Affairs from April to March 2002
- Minister for Education in 2004
- Minister for Internal Affairs from 2007 to 2008.

While Minister of Education, he was chairman of the Vanuatu National Commission for UNESCO.

Prime Minister Edward Natapei appointed him Minister for Lands in 2008, then reshuffled him to the position of Minister for Foreign Affairs, External Trade and Telecommunications in 2010. Natapei's government was ousted in a motion of no confidence in December 2010, and Natuman sat on the Opposition benches until Serge Vohor ascended to the premiership in a successful motion of no confidence against Prime Minister Sato Kilman on Easter Sunday (24 April), 2011, and restored Natuman as Minister for Foreign Affairs. Three weeks later, however, Vohor's election and premiership were voided by the Court of Appeal, and Natuman lost his position in government (13 May). On 16 June, Kilman's election and premiership were themselves voided by the Supreme Court, on constitutional grounds, and previous Prime Minister Edward Natapei became caretaker Prime Minister until a new leader could be elected. Natuman was restored as interim Minister of Foreign Affairs. Transparency International subsequently praised Natuman for having, as Minister for Foreign Affairs, "proceeded with a full clean-up" in the selling of diplomatic passports which had occurred frequently under previous governments. On 26 June 2011, Sato Kilman was elected Prime Minister by Parliament, and Natuman lost his position in government.

Natuman was convicted of conspiracy to pervert the course of justice in 2018 and given a suspended sentence. He was pardoned by the President of Vanuatu, Tallis Obed Moses, in September 2021, which restores his eligibility to run for public office again.

Political offices
Preceded by Moana Carcasses Kalosil	Prime Minister of Vanuatu; 2014–2015	Succeeded by Sato Kilman
