= Sato Kilman =

Former Prime Minister of Vanuatu

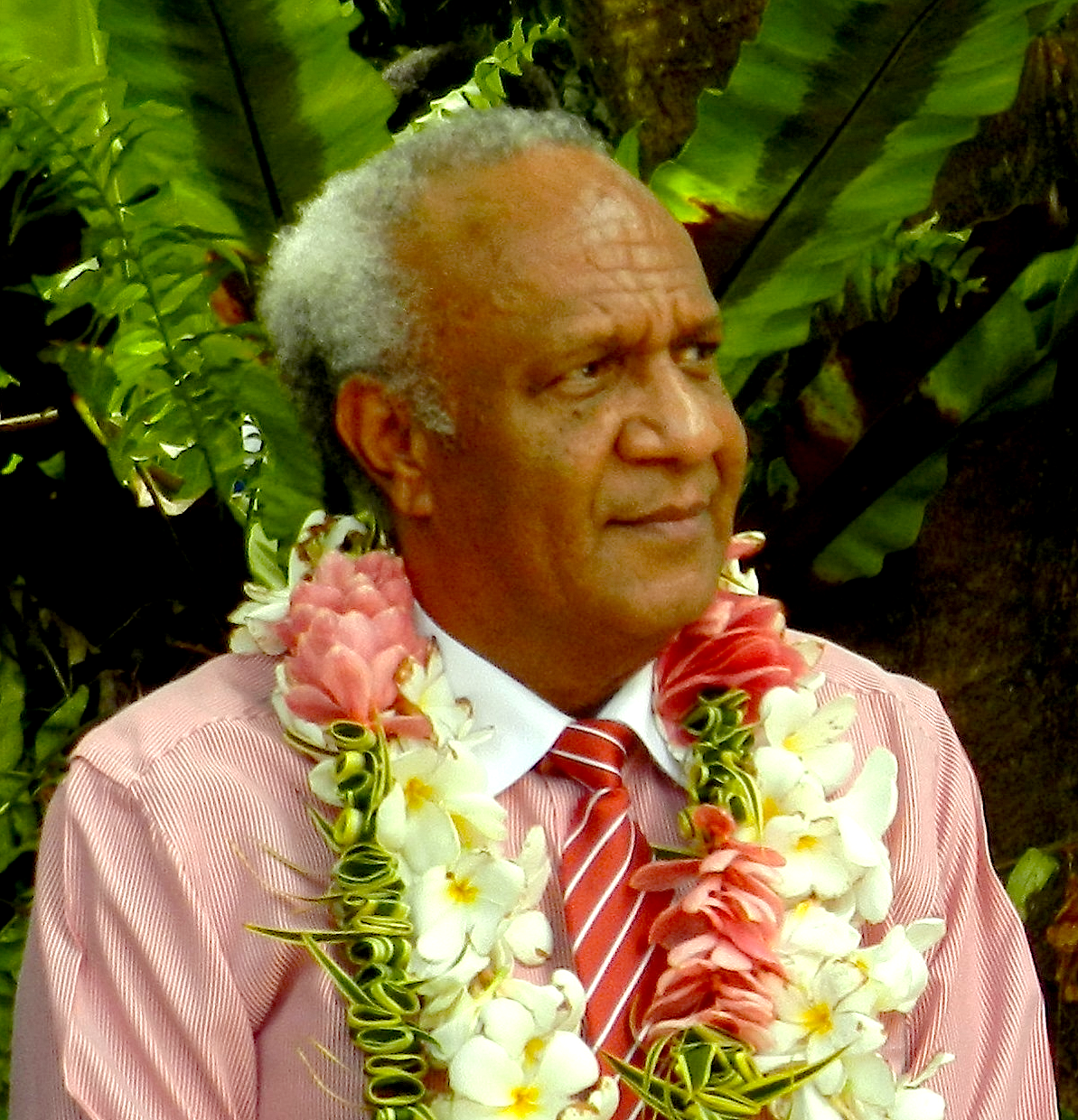
- Kilman in 2013

Prime Minister of Vanuatu
- In office 4 September 2023 – 6 October 2023
- President: Nikenike Vurobaravu
- Preceded by: Ishmael Kalsakau
- Succeeded by: Charlot Salwai
- In office 11 June 2015 – 11 February 2016
- President: Baldwin Lonsdale
- Preceded by: Joe Natuman
- Succeeded by: Charlot Salwai
- In office 26 June 2011 – 23 March 2013
- President: Iolu Abil
- Preceded by: Edward Natapei (Acting)
- Succeeded by: Moana Carcasses Kalosil
- In office 13 May 2011 – 16 June 2011
- President: Iolu Abil
- Preceded by: Serge Vohor
- Succeeded by: Edward Natapei (Acting)
- In office 2 December 2010 – 24 April 2011
- President: Iolu Abil
- Preceded by: Edward Natapei
- Succeeded by: Serge Vohor

Personal details
- Born: 30 December 1957 (age 68) Malakula, New Hebrides (present day Vanuatu)
- Party: People's Progressive Party
- Occupation: Police officer

Meltek Sato Kilman Livtuvanu (born 30 December 1957) is a Vanuatuan politician who served as the Prime Minister of Vanuatu on four previous occasions, most recently from 4 September to 6 October 2023. He was previously prime minister from December 2010 to April 2011, from May to June 2011 and June 2015 to February 2016, though his premiership was subsequently annulled by a court of law.

Kilman was elected prime minister again on 26 June 2011, thus beginning his first legally recognised term in the premiership; he served until 23 March 2013. He is also the Leader of the People's Progress Party and an MP from Lakatoro on Malekula Island. On October 6, 2023, he was ousted by a vote of no confidence.

== Early life and police career ==
Kilman was born on 30 December 1957. His home island is Malekula.

In 1977, Kilman joined the British Police Force in New Hebrides as a corporal. Following the independence of Vanuatu in 1980, he underwent training with the Royal Papua New Guinea Constabulary. Kilman was appointed commander of the Vanuatu Mobile Forces in 1984 and assistant commissioner of the Vanuatu Police Force in 1986. He was promoted to police commissioner in 1992, but was dismissed the following year and controversially replaced with a political appointee who had a criminal record. He subsequently pursued business interests in the logging industry.

== Politics ==
Kilman and Ham Lini led the opposition to the Serge Vohor government when it took office in July 2004. Lini soon joined a coalition government with Vohor as Kilman became the leader of the opposition and a particularly strong critic of Vohor's attempts to establish relations with Taiwan. In December 2004, Kilman filed the no confidence motion which deposed Vohor and made Lini prime minister. In the new cabinet established on 13 December 2004, Kilman was rewarded by becoming Lini's deputy, as well as taking the position of foreign minister.

Kilman was dismissed from the government in a cabinet reshuffle in late July 2007. According to the government, this was due to alleged fraud, involving money stolen from the government, in which Kilman's political secretary was said to be involved.

Following the 2008 general election, the People's Progress Party was in Opposition, as part of the Alliance bloc. In March 2009, Kilman was named leader of the Opposition, because the Alliance bloc had the largest number of seats of any Opposition party or alliance. In November 2009, in a major cabinet reshuffle, Kilman was brought into Natapei's government as deputy prime minister.

=== First terms as prime minister (2010–2013) ===
On 2 December 2010 Kilman was appointed prime minister after Edward Natapei was ousted in a vote of no confidence. Kilman was himself narrowly ousted in a vote of no confidence on 24 April 2011 (Easter Sunday), by 26 votes to 25; Serge Vohor succeeded him.

Vohor's election was declared invalid on 13 May 2011, as he only had a relative majority, and not an absolute one.

On 16 June, Chief Justice Vincent Lunabek ruled in a separate case put forward by Edward Natapei, contesting the constitutionality of Kilman's initial election in December 2010. Lunabek ruled that Kilman's election to office had indeed been unconstitutional, as "[t]he speaker of Parliament Maxime Carlot Korman [had] appointed Mr Kilman prime minister without following article 41 of the constitution which required he be elected by secret ballot". Kilman's premiership was annulled, and Natapei was restored as interim prime minister, instructed to convene Parliament for the election of a new prime minister. Ironically, as Natapei's ministers were restored as interim ministers, Kilman reverted to being Natapei's interim deputy prime minister - a position he was expected to hold only for a few days.

On 26 June, Kilman stood for the premiership, and was elected by Parliament, with 29 votes to Serge Vohor's 23.

He retained the confidence of Parliament following the October 2012 general election, forming a broad coalition government.

On 20 March 2013, Minister for Justice and Social Welfare Thomas Laken and Minister for Ni-Vanuatu Business Marcellino Pipite crossed the floor to join the Opposition, along with six government backbenchers. Lacking a majority with which to govern, Kilman announced his resignation the following day, before a motion of no confidence could be brought against him. On 23 March, Parliament elected Moana Carcasses Kalosil to succeed him.

On 15 May 2014, Carcasses was ousted in a motion of no confidence. New Prime Minister Joe Natuman appointed Kilman his Minister for Foreign Affairs and Trade. In early June 2015, Natuman sacked him for having said publicly that he could support a motion of no confidence against the government.

=== Return to office ===
On 11 June 2015, Kilman became prime minister again. He ousted Joe Natuman through a no-confidence vote, having been sacked as foreign minister by Natuman the previous week.

In October 2015, half of the MPs in Kilman's government, including Deputy Prime Minister Moana Carcasses and several other ministers, were imprisoned for bribery. Kilman refused to comment publicly during the case, and allowed convicted MPs to remain in their positions as government ministers right up until the point of their imprisonment. His perceived lack of leadership during the crisis, and refusal to take responsibility for corruption within his government, was widely criticised and led to calls for his resignation.

On 4 September 2023, he returned as prime minister replacing Ishmael Kalsakau. Kilman told fellow MPs his top concern would be to "review foreign policy so that it benefitted Vanuatu more", also seeking "new export markets". The prime minister election came as a result of a political crisis, leading to former PM Kalsakau's ousting "for actions including signing a security pact with Australia".

Political offices
Preceded by Edward Natapei	Prime Minister of Vanuatu; 2010–2011	Succeeded by Serge Vohor
Preceded by Serge Vohor	Prime Minister of Vanuatu; 2011	Succeeded by Edward Natapei; Acting
Preceded by Edward Natapei; Acting	Prime Minister of Vanuatu; 2011–2013	Succeeded by Moana Carcasses Kalosil
Preceded by Joe Natuman	Prime Minister of Vanuatu; 2015–2016	Succeeded by Charlot Salwai
Preceded by Ishmael Kalsakau	Prime Minister of Vanuatu; 2023	Succeeded by Charlot Salwai
