= Moana Carcasses Kalosil =

Prime Minister of Vanuatu from 2013 to 2014

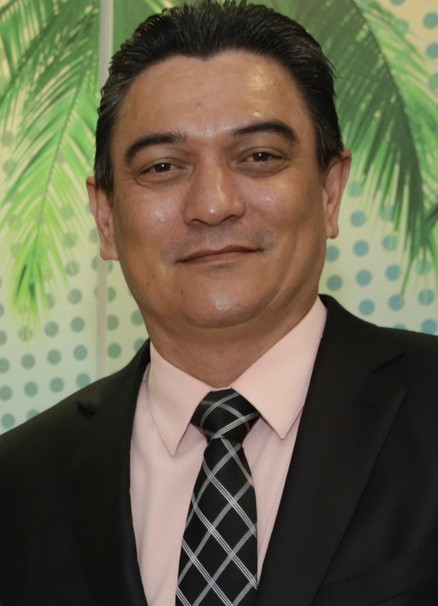
- Carcasses in 2013

Prime Minister of Vanuatu
- In office 23 March 2013 – 15 May 2014
- President: Iolu Abil
- Preceded by: Sato Kilman
- Succeeded by: Joe Natuman

Personal details
- Born: 27 January 1963 (age 63) Taravao, French Polynesia
- Party: Green Confederation
- Spouse: Marie Louise Milne

Moana Carcasses Kalosil (born 27 January 1963) is a Ni-Vanuatu politician who became Prime Minister of Vanuatu from March 2013 to May 2014. He was the first naturalized citizen of Vanuatu to become the country's prime minister.

Carcasses was ousted as prime minister in 2014 in a motion of no-confidence, but returned to government in 2015 as deputy prime minister in the government let by Sato Kilman. In October 2015, Carcasses and 13 of his fellow government MPs were imprisoned for bribery after the Vanuatu Supreme Court found that Carcasses had offered loans to the other MPs to gain their support in a motion of no-confidence while in Opposition.

== Biography ==
Moana Carcasses was born on 27 January 1963 in Taravao, Tahiti, French Polynesia. His mother was ethnically Tahitian. His French father was originally from the region surrounding Carcassonne in Southern France.

=== Political career ===
He served as Foreign Minister under Prime Minister Edward Natapei from 2003 to 2004. Following parliamentary elections, he became Minister of Finance on 28 July 2004 under Prime Minister Serge Vohor. He kept the post of finance minister when Ham Lini became prime minister later in 2004. He remained in that position until 14 November 2005, when he was sacked by Lini for unclear reasons.

He is a member of the Vanuatu Green Party (Green Confederation), which he led into the opposition when he lost his cabinet post in November 2005. On that occasion became deputy leader of the opposition.

In the September 2008 general election, he retained his seat, as well as the leadership of the Green Confederation, and became whip of the parliamentary Opposition to Prime Minister Edward Natapei's government.

In December 2008, he and fellow Member of Parliament Ralph Regenvanu were arrested, detained by the police for 24 hours, and charged with "harbouring and aiding of prisoners", "obstructing police on duty" and "accessory after the fact" to the breakout of 30 inmates from the country's main prison in Port Vila. Although Regenvanu admitted having known of the plans for the breakout, and having assisted escapees in finding shelter at the Malvatu Mauri nakamal, it is not clear what role Carcasses allegedly played in these events. They were released, provisionally, and appeared in court in February 2009. In January 2009, Prime Minister Edward Natapei's government stated that it would consider seeking Regenvanu's and Carcasses' suspension from Parliament over the charges.

In September 2009, the Supreme Court dropped all charges against both men.

In December 2009, in the context of a Cabinet reshuffle, Carcasses left the Opposition and joined Natapei's government, becoming Minister of Internal Affairs. In his latter capacity, he argued that unemployment in Vanuatu should be addressed by encouraging young people to return to agricultural work in their native rural areas, and produce their own food, rather than move to Port Vila where they would often struggle to find a job. He joined the Cabinet as the leader of an informal "Alliance" of MPs from a variety of small parties, and three independent MPs.

As Minister responsible for Internal Affairs and Labour, he stated that he had prevented unqualified applicant Chinese labourers in the construction sector from obtaining or renewing work permits, "because these people wanted to rob employment from Ni-Vanuatu. My policy is that 'man ples' Ni-Vanuatu are the priority".

In December 2010, when the Natapei government was ousted in a vote of no confidence, Carcasses supported his successor Sato Kilman, and obtained a post as Minister of Finance and Economic Management in the new government. Kilman was himself ousted in a vote of no confidence on 24 April 2011, however, and Carcasses lost his position in government. He recovered it three weeks later, on 13 May, when the court of appeal voided the election of Serge Vohor's new government on constitutional grounds, and the Kilman government was restored. This lasted for only a month; on 16 June, the Kilman premiership was itself voided on constitutional grounds by the Supreme Court's Chief Justice Vincent Lunabek, and Carcasses lost office once more. He regained it on 26 June when Kilman was restored as prime minister by Parliament, and reinstated his Cabinet.

=== Prime Minister of Vanuatu ===
Carcasses retained his seat in the October 2012 general election, and maintained his confidence in the Kilman government, of which however he was no longer a member. He sat as a government backbencher until 20 March 2013, when he was one of 8 MPs to cross the floor, join the Opposition and force Kilman to resign. Three days later, Parliament elected Carcasses as prime minister, with the support of 34 MPs out of 52. He is the first foreign-born person to lead the country, and his predecessor objected to his election on those grounds.

In addition to his focus on the environment (including the creation of a Ministry for Planning and Climate Change), the press noted "his unwavering support for the West Papua cause", and his opposition to Indonesia's participation as an observer in the Melanesian Spearhead Group - a position which contrasted with his predecessor's.

He entrusted his Minister for Foreign Affairs, Edward Natapei, with a clean-up of the selling of diplomatic passports by previous governments. Within the first few days of the Carcasses government, the passports of "about ten" diplomats were revoked, with indications that more than two-thirds of the country's diplomats could lose their position, as their appointment had not followed proper procedures.

=== Bribery ===
In October 2015, Moana Carcasses and 13 other MPs were found guilty by the Vanuatu Supreme Court of bribery under the Penal Code. (An additional MP, Willie Jimmy, had already pleaded guilty, and another, Robert Bohn, was acquitted.) Carcasses was deputy prime minister at the time of his conviction. The court found that Carcasses, together with Tony Ngari MP, had offered bribes totalling $452,000 to the other MPs to secure their support in a motion of no-confidence to oust the government of Joe Natuman. The judge, Justice Mary Sey, refused to accept the defence argument that these payments were development loans. At one point during the trial, Carcassess was accused of threatening a witness. Additional charges of inappropriate giving of loans under the Leadership Code Act were dropped after it was ruled in a separate court judgement that the Ombudsman had not followed proper procedure in preparing a report into these allegations.

In the aftermath of the verdict, Carcasses called for calm and for people to respect the law. He was not among the MPs who faced additional charges of conspiracy to pervert the course of justice after Speaker of Parliament Marcellino Pipite, one of the convicts, attempted to use his powers as Acting President to have himself and the others pardoned. Carcasses was sentenced to 4 years imprisonment; most of those whom he had bribed received 3-year jail terms. The case was widely acclaimed as a positive step towards tackling corruption in Vanuatu.

=== Later career ===
Kalosil ran for a seat in parliament representing Efate Rural Constituency for the Green Confederation in the 2025 Vanuatuan general election, which he lost.

== Personal life ==
Kalosil is married to Marie Louise Paulette Milne, who became a deputy mayor of Port Vila and ran with her husband for parliament in the 2025 general election under the Green Confederation, in which she won a seat in Port Vila constituency.

Political offices
Preceded by Sato Kilman	Prime Minister of Vanuatu; 2013–2014	Succeeded by Joe Natuman
