= List of members of the Representative Assembly of the New Hebrides (1975–1977) =

The members of the Representative Assembly of the New Hebrides from 1975 to 1977 were elected on 10 November 1975.

== List of members ==
Constituency	Elected member	Party	Notes
Ambrym	Jack Hopa	New Hebrides National Party	
Aoba–Maevo	Joel Mera	New Hebrides National Party	
Aoba–Maevo	Thomas Tung	Movement for the Autonomy of the New Hebrides	
Banks–Torres	George Worek	New Hebrides National Party	
Malekula	Gérard Leymang	Union of the Communities of the New Hebrides	
Malekula	Keith Obed	New Hebrides National Party	
Malekula	Sethy Regenvanu	New Hebrides National Party	
North Efate	Donald Kalpokas	New Hebrides National Party	
Paama–Epi	Jack Taritonga	New Hebrides National Party	
Pentecost	Vincent Boulekone	Union of the Communities of the New Hebrides	
Pentecost	Walter Lini	New Hebrides National Party	
Port Vila	Remy Delaveuve	Union of the Communities of the New Hebrides	
Port Vila	Tessa Fowler	Union of the Communities of the New Hebrides	
Port Vila	Yoan Kalsakau	Union of the Communities of the New Hebrides	
Port Vila	Kaltak Kaltefer	Union of the Communities of the New Hebrides	
Port Vila	Guy Prévot	Union of the Communities of the New Hebrides	
Port Vila	Ernest Reid	Union of the Communities of the New Hebrides	
Santo Rural	Titus Path	New Hebrides National Party	Result annulled in May 1976. Path was re-elected in the subsequent by-election
Santo Rural	Michel Thevenin	Movement for the Autonomy of the New Hebrides	Result annulled in May 1976. Jimmy Stevens (Nagriamel) won the subsequent by-election
Santo Rural	Reuben Thomas	New Hebrides National Party	Result annulled in May 1976. Reuben was re-elected in the subsequent by-election
Santo Town	Philibert de Montgremier	New Hebrides National Party	Result annulled in July 1976. George Cronsteadt (MANH) won the subsequent by-election
Santo Town	Mary Gilu	New Hebrides National Party	Result annulled in May 1976. Gilu was re-elected in the subsequent by-election
Santo Town	Shem Rarua	New Hebrides National Party	
Shepherds	Kenneth Tariliu	New Hebrides National Party	
South Efate	George Kalkoa	New Hebrides National Party	
Tanna	Iolu Abil	New Hebrides National Party	
Tanna	Charles Nako	Union of the Communities of the New Hebrides	
Tanna	Aissin Nokohout	Union of the Communities of the New Hebrides	
Tanna Outer Islands	John Naupa	New Hebrides National Party	
British Chamber of Commerce	René Ah Pow		
British Chamber of Commerce	Wai Chung		
British Chamber of Commerce	John Stegler		
French Chamber of Commerce	R. Bacon		
French Chamber of Commerce	Philippe Delacroix		
French Chamber of Commerce	R. Keller		
Co-operatives	Willie Abel		
Co-operatives	Kalpokor Kalsakau		
Co-operatives	Adrien Palaud		
Centre District I Chief	Fred Timakata		
Centre District II Chief	Willie Bongmatur		
Northern District Chief	Moli Tasa Tamata		
Southern District Chief	Ringuiao		
Source: Plant, Stech
