= List of members of the Parliament of Vanuatu (1987–1991) =

The 46 members of the Parliament of Vanuatu from 1987 to 1991 were elected on 30 November 1987.

== List of members ==
Constituency	Member	Party	Notes
Ambae	Samson Bue	Union of Moderate Parties	Dismissed from parliament in July 1988. By-election on 12 December 1988 won by Tarisevuti Wilson (VP)
Ambae	Harold Qualao	Vanua'aku Pati	
Ambae	Onneyn Tahi	Vanua'aku Pati	
Ambrym	Amos Andeng	Union of Moderate Parties	Dismissed from parliament in July 1988. By-election on 12 December 1988 won by Andrew Welwel (VP)
Ambrym	Jack Hopa	Vanua'aku Pati	
Banks and Torres	Luke Dini	Union of Moderate Parties	Dismissed from parliament in July 1988. By-election on 12 December 1988 won by George Baet (VP)
Banks and Torres	Charles Godden	Vanua'aku Pati	Resigned from parliament in November 1988. By-election on 28 November 1989 won by Cecil Sinker (VP)
Efate	Andes Jacques Carlot	Union of Moderate Parties	Dismissed from parliament in July 1988. By-election on 12 December 1988 won by Tele Taun and Thomas Tanarango (both VP)
Efate	Joel Mansale	Union of Moderate Parties	Dismissed from parliament in July 1988. By-election on 12 December 1988 won by Tele Taun and Thomas Tanarango (both VP)
Efate	Donald Kalpokas	Vanua'aku Pati	
Efate	Jimmy Meto Chilia	Vanua'aku Pati	
Epi	Jimmy Simon	Vanua'aku Pati	Resigned from parliament in November 1988. By-election on 28 November 1989 won by Tangat Yapet (VP)
Luganville	Alfred Maseng	Union of Moderate Parties	Dismissed from parliament in July 1988. By-election on 12 December 1988 won by Kalo Nial (VP)
Luganville	William Edgell	Vanua'aku Pati	Resigned from parliament in November 1988. By-election on 28 November 1989 won by Russon Seth (VP)
Maewo	Roger Jerry Boe	Vanua'aku Pati	
Malekula	Lingtamat Anatole	Vanua'aku Pati	Resigned from parliament in November 1988. By-election on 28 November 1989 won by Emile Waniel (VP)
Malekula	Simeon Ennis	Vanua'aku Pati	
Malekula	Adrien Malere	Union of Moderate Parties	Dismissed from parliament in July 1988. By-election on 12 December 1988 won by Daniel Nato and Tawi John Wesley (both VP)
Malekula	Paul Telukluk	Union of Moderate Parties	Dismissed from parliament in July 1988. By-election on 12 December 1988 won by Daniel Nato and Tawi John Wesley (both VP)
Malekula	Aileh Rantes	Vanua'aku Pati	
Malekula	Sethy Regenvanu	Vanua'aku Pati	
Other Southern Islands	Edward Natapei	Vanua'aku Pati	
Paama	William Mahit	Vanua'aku Pati	
Pentecost	Gaetano Bulewak	Union of Moderate Parties	
Pentecost	Walter Lini	Vanua'aku Pati	
Pentecost	Basile Tabi	Vanua'aku Pati	
Pentecost	Vincent Boulekone	Union of Moderate Parties	
Port Vila	Maxime Carlot Korman	Union of Moderate Parties	Dismissed from parliament in July 1988. By-election on 12 December 1988 won by Jacobe Joseph (TU), Kalkot Mataskelekele (VP) and Kalanga Sawia (VP)
Port Vila	Maria Crowby	Union of Moderate Parties	Dismissed from parliament in July 1988. By-election on 12 December 1988 won by Jacobe Joseph (TU), Kalkot Mataskelekele (VP) and Kalanga Sawia (VP)
Port Vila	Willie Jimmy	Union of Moderate Parties	Dismissed from parliament in July 1988. By-election on 12 December 1988 won by Jacobe Joseph (TU), Kalkot Mataskelekele (VP) and Kalanga Sawia (VP)
Port Vila	Motarilavoa Hilda Lin̄i	Vanua'aku Pati	
Port Vila	Barak Sopé	Vanua'aku Pati	Resigned from parliament in November 1988. By-election on 28 November 1989 won by Thomas Faratia (VP)
Santo–Malo–Aore	Harry Karaeru	Union of Moderate Parties	Dismissed from parliament in July 1988. Three seats filled in a by-election on 12 December 1988 won by Keith Daniel (TU), Sarki Robert (VP) and James Vuti (VP) Fourth seat filled in a by-election on 28 November 1989 won by Louis Vatu (TU)
Santo–Malo–Aore	Andrew Molieno	Union of Moderate Parties	Dismissed from parliament in July 1988. Three seats filled in a by-election on 12 December 1988 won by Keith Daniel (TU), Sarki Robert (VP) and James Vuti (VP) Fourth seat filled in a by-election on 28 November 1989 won by Louis Vatu (TU)
Santo–Malo–Aore	Serge Vohor	Union of Moderate Parties	Dismissed from parliament in July 1988. Three seats filled in a by-election on 12 December 1988 won by Keith Daniel (TU), Sarki Robert (VP) and James Vuti (VP) Fourth seat filled in a by-election on 28 November 1989 won by Louis Vatu (TU)
Santo–Malo–Aore	René Luc	Fren Melanesian Party	Dismissed from parliament in July 1988. Three seats filled in a by-election on 12 December 1988 won by Keith Daniel (TU), Sarki Robert (VP) and James Vuti (VP) Fourth seat filled in a by-election on 28 November 1989 won by Louis Vatu (TU)
Santo–Malo–Aore	Sela Molisa	Vanua'aku Pati	
Santo–Malo–Aore	Kavcor Wass	Vanua'aku Pati	
Sherpherds	David Kari	Vanua'aku Pati	
Sherpherds	Fred Timakata	Vanua'aku Pati	Elected president in 1989. By-election on 28 November 1989 won by Etchin Shem (VP)
Tanna	Iolu Abil	Vanua'aku Pati	
Tanna	Daniel Iamiaham	Vanua'aku Pati	
Tanna	Henry Iouiou	Vanua'aku Pati	
Tanna	Iaris Naunun	Union of Moderate Parties	Dismissed from parliament in July 1988. By-election on 12 December 1988 won by Jack Iauko (VP), Noanikam Jimmy (TU) and Gideon Kota (VP)
Tanna	Keasipai Song	Union of Moderate Parties	Dismissed from parliament in July 1988. By-election on 12 December 1988 won by Jack Iauko (VP), Noanikam Jimmy (TU) and Gideon Kota (VP)
Tanna	Kawai Thompson	Union of Moderate Parties	Dismissed from parliament in July 1988. By-election on 12 December 1988 won by Jack Iauko (VP), Noanikam Jimmy (TU) and Gideon Kota (VP)
Source: Official Gazette
