= List of members of the Parliament of Vanuatu (1983–1987) =

The 39 members of the Parliament of Vanuatu from 1983 to 1987 were elected on 2 November 1983.

== List of members ==
Constituency	Member	Party
Ambae and Maewo	Amos Bangabiti	Union of Moderate Parties
Ambae and Maewo	Aaron Natu	Vanua'aku Pati
Ambae and Maewo	Onneyn Tahi	Vanua'aku Pati
Ambrym	Jack Hopa	Vanua'aku Pati
Ambrym	John Tete	Union of Moderate Parties
Banks and Torres	Charles Godden	Vanua'aku Pati
Banks and Torres	Norman Roslyn	Vanua'aku Pati
Efate	Donald Kalpokas	Vanua'aku Pati
Efate	Joel Mansale	Union of Moderate Parties
Efate	Barak Sopé	Vanua'aku Pati
Epi	Jimmy Simon	Vanua'aku Pati
Luganville	Alfred Maseng	Union of Moderate Parties
Luganville	Andrew Welwel	Vanua'aku Pati
Malekula	Adrien Malere	Namangi Aute
Malekula	Lucien Litoung	Union of Moderate Parties
Malekula	Keith Obed	Vanua'aku Pati
Malekula	Aileh Rantes	Vanua'aku Pati
Malekula	Sethy Regenvanu	Vanua'aku Pati
Other Southern Islands	Edward Natapei	Vanua'aku Pati
Paama	Edward Harris	Vanua'aku Pati
Pentecost	Vincent Boulekone	Union of Moderate Parties
Pentecost	Walter Lini	Vanua'aku Pati
Pentecost	Ezekiel Buletangsu	Vanua'aku Pati
Santo–Malo–Aore	Jole Antas	Vanua'aku Pati
Santo–Malo–Aore	Harry Karaeuru	Nagriamel
Santo–Malo–Aore	Rene Luc	Fren Melanesian Party
Santo–Malo–Aore	Sela Molisa	Vanua'aku Pati
Santo–Malo–Aore	Serge Vohor	Union of Moderate Parties
Shepherds	Kenneth Tariliu	Vanua'aku Pati
Shepherds	Fred Timakata	Vanua'aku Pati
Tanna	Jack Kapum	Union of Moderate Parties
Tanna	Willie Korisa	Vanua'aku Pati
Tanna	Jean-Marie Léyé	Union of Moderate Parties
Tanna	John Louhman	Vanua'aku Pati
Tanna	Kawai Thompson	Union of Moderate Parties
Vila	Maxime Carlot Korman	Union of Moderate Parties
Vila	Willie Jimmy	Union of Moderate Parties
Vila	Kalpokor Kalsakau	Vanua'aku Pati
Vila	Albert Sande	Vanua'aku Pati
Source: Official Gazette
