= List of members of the Parliament of Vanuatu (1979–1983) =

The 39 members of the Parliament of Vanuatu from 1979 to 1983 were elected on 14 November 1979.

== List of members ==
Constituency	Member	Party	Notes
Ambrym	Amos Andeng	New Hebrides Federal Party	
Ambrym	Jack Hopa	Vanua'aku Pati	
Aoba–Maewo	Onneyn Tahi	Vanua'aku Pati	
Aoba–Maewo	Thomas Tungu	Moderate Party	
Aoba–Maewo	Judah Vira	Vanua'aku Pati	
Banks and Torres	Norman Roslyn	Vanua'aku Pati	
Banks and Torres	George Worek	Vanua'aku Pati	
Efate Rural	Nanua Albert	Vanua'aku Pati	
Efate Rural	George Kalkoa	Vanua'aku Pati	Elected president in 1980. By-election held on 26 August 1982 and won by Dick Poilapa (Vanua'aku Pati)
Efate Rural	Donald Kalpokas	Vanua'aku Pati	
Epi	Jack Taritonga	Vanua'aku Pati	
Luganville	George Cronsteadt	Moderate Party	Deported and declared a prohibited immigrant. By-election held on 31 August 1982 and won by Sela Molisa (Vanua'aku Pati).
Luganville	Kalmer Vocor	Natui Tanno	
Malakula	Gérard Leymang	Namangi Aute	
Malakula	Aimé Maléré	Namangi Aute	
Malakula	Keith Obed	Vanua'aku Pati	
Malakula	Sethy Regenvanu	Vanua'aku Pati	
Malakula	Jimmy Simeon	Vanua'aku Pati	
Paama	Edward Harris	Vanua'aku Pati	
Pentecost	Vincent Boulekone	Independent	
Pentecost	Samuel Bule	Vanua'aku Pati	
Pentecost	Walter Lini	Vanua'aku Pati	
Port Vila	Maxime Carlot Korman	Independent	
Port Vila	Kalpokor Kalsakau	Vanua'aku Pati	
Port Vila	Guy Prévot	New Hebrides Federal Party–UCNH	Deported and declared a prohibited immigrant. By-election held on 26 August 1982 and won by Barak Sopé (Vanua'aku Pati)
Port Vila	Albert Sande	Vanua'aku Pati	
Santo Rural	Jole Antas	Vanua'aku Pati	
Santo Rural	Harry Karaeru	New Hebrides Federal Party	
Santo Rural	Alfred Maliu	New Hebrides Federal Party	
Santo Rural	War Nalan	New Hebrides Federal Party	
Santo Rural	Thomas Reuben	Vanua'aku Pati	
Shepherds	Kenneth Tariliu	Vanua'aku Pati	
Shepherds	Fred Timakata	Vanua'aku Pati	
Southern Islands	John Naupa	Vanua'aku Pati	
Tanna	Willie Korisa	Vanua'aku Pati	
Tanna	John Louhman	Vanua'aku Pati	
Tanna	Charley Nako	Kapiel	
Tanna	Gideon Nampas	Vanua'aku Pati	
Tanna	Alexis Yolou	John Frum Movement	Died in 1980. By-election held on 2 September 1982 and won by Jean-Marie Léyé (Union of Moderate Parties)
Source: Zorgbibe
