= 1983 Vanuatuan general election =

← 1979	2 November 1983	1987 →
- All 39 seats in Parliament; 20 seats needed for a majority
- Turnout: 74.90%
Party	Leader	Vote %	Seats	+/–
Vanua'aku Pati	Walter Lini	55.05	24	−1
UMP	Serge Vohor	28.64	12	+7
Nagriamel	Jimmy Stevens	2.84	1	New
Namangi Aute	Serge Vohor	2.62	1	−1
Friend Melanesian	Serge Vohor	2.30	1	New
This lists parties that won seats. See the complete results below.
Prime Minister before	Prime Minister after
Walter Lini; Vanua'aku	Walter Lini; Vanua'aku

General elections were held in Vanuatu on 2 November 1983, the first since independence from France and the United Kingdom (which had governed it as a Condominium) in 1980. The ruling Vanua'aku Pati won 24 seats, while the Union of Moderate Parties won 12. Walter Lini of the Vanua'aku Pati remained Prime Minister. Voter turnout was 74.9%.

== Electoral system ==
Most members were elected through single non-transferable voting in multi-seat districts having two to five members each. One member (the member for Epi) was elected through first past the post.

== Results ==
Party	Votes	%	Seats	+/–
Vanua'aku Pati	24,313	55.05	24	–1
Union of Moderate Parties	12,647	28.64	12	+10
Vanuatu Independent Alliance Party	1,738	3.94	0	New
Nagriamel	1,254	2.84	1	New
Namangi Aute	1,159	2.62	1	-1
Friend Melanesian Party	1,014	2.30	1	New
Independents	2,040	4.62	0	–2
Total	44,165	100.00	39	0
Valid votes	44,165	98.75		
Invalid/blank votes	561	1.25		
Total votes	44,726	100.00		
Registered voters/turnout	59,712	74.90		
Source: Nohlen et al., Pacific Islands Monthly

== See also ==
- List of members of the Parliament of Vanuatu (1983–1987)
