= 1987 Vanuatuan general election =

← 1983	30 November 1987	1991 →
- All 46 seats in Parliament; 23 seats needed for a majority
- Turnout: 71.64%
Party	Leader	Vote %	Seats	+/–
Vanua'aku Pati	Walter Lini	47.28	26	+2
UMP	Serge Vohor	39.87	19	+7
Friend Melanesian		1.99	1	0
This lists parties that won seats. See the complete results below.
Prime Minister before	Prime Minister after
Walter Lini; Vanua'aku	Walter Lini; Vanua'aku

General elections were held in Vanuatu on 30 November 1987. Ni-Vanuatu voters were invited to elect the 46 members of an expanded national Parliament, which had previously held 39 seats.

The ruling Vanua'aku Pati maintained its absolute majority, with 26 seats, while the Union of Moderate Parties obtained 19. The Vanua'aku Pati received slightly less than 50% of the popular vote, while the UMP received 40%. Walter Lini of the Vanua'aku Pati remained Prime Minister. Voter turnout was 71.6%.

Important issues in the election included domestic economic reforms (such as liberalising the economy) and the accommodation of the Francophone population.

== Electoral system ==
Most members were elected through single non-transferable voting in multi-seat districts having two to six members each. Four members were elected through first-past-the-post voting.

== Results ==
Party	Votes	%	Seats	+/–
Vanua'aku Pati	26,617	47.28	26	+2
Union of Moderate Parties	22,443	39.87	19	+6
New People's Party	1,418	2.52	0	New
Friend Melanesian Party	1,119	1.99	1	0
National Democratic Party	879	1.56	0	New
Nagriamel	766	1.36	0	–1
Vanuatu Independent Alliance Party	442	0.79	0	0
Vanuatu Labour Party	322	0.57	0	New
Independents	2,288	4.06	0	0
Total	56,294	100.00	46	+7
Valid votes	56,294	99.33		
Invalid/blank votes	382	0.67		
Total votes	56,676	100.00		
Registered voters/turnout	79,113	71.64		
Source: Official Gazette, Nohlen et al.

=== By constituency ===
Constituency	Candidate	Party	Votes	%
Ambae	Onneyn Tahi	Vanua'aku Pati	884	24.30
Ambae	Samson Bue	UMP	772	21.22
Ambae	Harold Colin Qualao	Vanua'aku Pati	766	21.06
Ambae	Amos Bangabiti	UMP	641	17.62
Ambae	John Tari Morris	Nagriamel	249	6.84
Ambae	James Mera	Vanua'aku Pati	232	6.38
Ambae	James Horo	New People's Party	94	2.58
Ambrym	Amos Adeng	UMP	1,469	46.84
Ambrym	Jack Tungon Hopa	Vanua'aku Pati	863	27.52
Ambrym	Welwel Andrew	Vanua'aku Pati	654	20.85
Ambrym	Kevin Jonathan	New People's Party	150	4.78
Banks and Torres	Charles Godden	Vanua'aku Pati	793	34.31
Banks and Torres	Luke Titinsom Dini	UMP	703	30.42
Banks and Torres	Derek Lulum Vanva	Vanua'aku Pati	551	23.84
Banks and Torres	Norman Roslyn	Independent	264	11.42
Efate	Andes Jacques Carlot	UMP	1,086	20.54
Efate	Joel Pakoalao Mansale	UMP	1,074	20.31
Efate	Donald Kalpokas	Vanua'aku Pati	934	17.67
Efate	Chilia Jimmy Meto	Vanua'aku Pati	920	17.40
Efate	Tele Taun	Vanua'aku Pati	912	17.25
Efate	James Kenneth Satungia	Labour	244	4.62
Efate	Kalosike Edith Matautotau	National Democratic	117	2.21
Epi	Jimmy Simon	Vanua'aku Pati	790	54.94
Epi	J. Kalala Waiwo	UMP	442	30.74
Epi	Reggie Robert	New People's Party	206	14.33
Luganville	Alfred Maseng	UMP	1,063	46.44
Luganville	Edgell William	Vanua'aku Pati	542	23.68
Luganville	Arusiro Willie	Vanua'aku Pati	386	16.86
Luganville	Joel Cyrus	Vanuatu Independent Alliance Party	169	7.38
Luganville	Noel Takau	New People's Party	98	4.28
Luganville	Thomas Reynolds	Labour	31	1.35
Maewo	Roger Jerry Boe	Vanua'aku Pati	539	56.38
Maewo	Tom Sigo	UMP	161	16.84
Maewo	Ezechiel Toa	Independent	145	15.17
Maewo	Frederick Boe	Independent	111	11.61
Malekula	Lingtamat Anatole	Vanua'aku Pati	1,229	14.54
Malekula	Sethy Regenvanu	Vanua'aku Pati	1,072	12.68
Malekula	Adrien Malere	UMP	926	10.95
Malekula	Paul Telukluk	UMP	890	10.53
Malekula	Aileh Rantes	Vanua'aku Pati	881	10.42
Malekula	Simeon Ennis	Vanua'aku Pati	822	9.72
Malekula	Aime Claude Malere	UMP	685	8.10
Malekula	Willion Willy	Vanua'aku Pati	599	7.08
Malekula	Fidel Dra Fabian	UMP	488	5.77
Malekula	Edson David	National Democratic	331	3.91
Malekula	Nacisse Fred	Friend Melanesian	277	3.28
Malekula	Jerry Donabit	New People's Party	155	1.83
Malekula	Hollingson Issachar	National Democratic	91	1.08
Malekula	Malsekan Jean Baotuste	Independent	9	0.11
Other Southern Islands	Edward Natapei	Vanua'aku Pati	606	54.74
Other Southern Islands	Leye Christophe	UMP	461	41.64
Other Southern Islands	Naupa John	National Democratic	40	3.61
Paama	William Mahit	Vanua'aku Pati	553	51.35
Paama	Mael William	UMP	524	48.65
Pentecost	Walter Lini	Vanua'aku Pati	1,392	29.19
Pentecost	Vincent Boulekone	UMP	1,094	22.94
Pentecost	Gaetano Bulewak	UMP	849	17.80
Pentecost	Basile Tabi	Vanua'aku Pati	620	13.00
Pentecost	Luke Fargo	Vanua'aku Pati	572	11.99
Pentecost	Job W. Tabi	Independent	159	3.33
Pentecost	Frazer Sine	New People's Party	83	1.74
Port Vila	Maxime Carlot Korman	UMP	999	20.16
Port Vila	Willie Jimmy	UMP	945	19.07
Port Vila	Maria Crowby	UMP	671	13.54
Port Vila	Hilda Lini	Vanua'aku Pati	602	12.15
Port Vila	Barak Sopé	Vanua'aku Pati	524	10.57
Port Vila	Kalpokor Kalsakau	Vanua'aku Pati	520	10.49
Port Vila	Albert Sandy	Vanua'aku Pati	343	6.92
Port Vila	Frank Abel	New People's Party	175	3.53
Port Vila	Franck Bakeo Spooner	National Democratic	139	2.80
Port Vila	George Kaltoi Kalsakau	Labour	38	0.77
Santo–Malo–Aore	Sela Molisa	Vanua'aku Pati	1,250	17.38
Santo–Malo–Aore	Serge Vohor	UMP	1,093	15.20
Santo–Malo–Aore	Harry Karaeru	UMP	946	13.15
Santo–Malo–Aore	Rene Luc	Friend Melanesian	842	11.71
Santo–Malo–Aore	Vuro Baravu Andrew Molieno	UMP	807	11.22
Santo–Malo–Aore	Kavcor Wass	Vanua'aku Pati	750	10.43
Santo–Malo–Aore	Sarki Robert	Vanua'aku Pati	715	9.94
Santo–Malo–Aore	Thomas Ruben Seru	Vanuatu Independent Alliance Party	273	3.80
Santo–Malo–Aore	James Tangis Indofon	Nagriamel	264	3.67
Santo–Malo–Aore	Dom Dimala	Nagriamel	253	3.52
Shepherds	David Karie	Vanua'aku Pati	531	29.83
Shepherds	Fred Timakata	Vanua'aku Pati	419	23.54
Shepherds	Raymond Clay	UMP	376	21.12
Shepherds	Jimmy Tasso	New People's Party	293	16.46
Shepherds	Api Toara	National Democratic	161	9.04
Tanna	Henry Iouiou	Vanua'aku Pati	1,120	14.17
Tanna	Iaris Naunun	UMP	1,059	13.40
Tanna	Iolu Abil	Vanua'aku Pati	1,040	13.16
Tanna	Keasipai Song	UMP	1,000	12.66
Tanna	Daniel Iamiham	Vanua'aku Pati	691	8.74
Tanna	Kawai Thompson	UMP	646	8.18
Tanna	Nango Charley	UMP	573	7.25
Tanna	Korisa Willie	Independent	510	6.45
Tanna	Silas Iaunam	Independent	449	5.68
Tanna	Nicklam Jonathan Jimmy	Independent	423	5.35
Tanna	Tom Numake	Independent	183	2.32
Tanna	Jeffry Lahva	New People's Party	164	2.08
Tanna	Kapum Jack	Independent	35	0.44
Tanna	Willie Ioba	Labour	9	0.11

== Aftermath ==
In 1988 five MPs led by Barak Sopé left the Vanua'aku Pati and created the Melanesian Progressive Party. The five were subsequently expelled from Parliament on 24 July 1988 by the Speaker Onneyn Tahi at the request of the Lini government, invoking a 1983 law that automatically vacates the seats of MPs who change political party during the parliamentary term. Sopé and Maxime Carlot, the leader of the Union of Moderate Parties then described Lini as a "dictator" and 18 of the 20 UMP deputies started boycotting Parliament. On 27 July, after being absent from Parliament for three consecutive days, the 18 deputies were also expelled by Tahi, who considered that they had resigned their seats. In September the Supreme Court confirmed the legality of the dismissal of the 23 MPs, opening the way to the holding of by-elections. The only two UMP MPs who were not expelled were Vincent Boulekone and Gaetano Bulewak, who refused to go along with the UMP's boycott strategy. They were subsequently excluded from the UMP and founded the Tan Union.

The by-elections of 1988 and 1989 were boycotted by the UMP and the Melanesian Progressive Party, with most seats won by the Vanua'aku Pati.

== See also ==
- List of members of the Parliament of Vanuatu (1987–1991)
