= Minerva Reefs =

Two submerged atolls in the South Pacific, claimed by Fiji and Tonga

Coordinates: 23°38′S 178°54′W

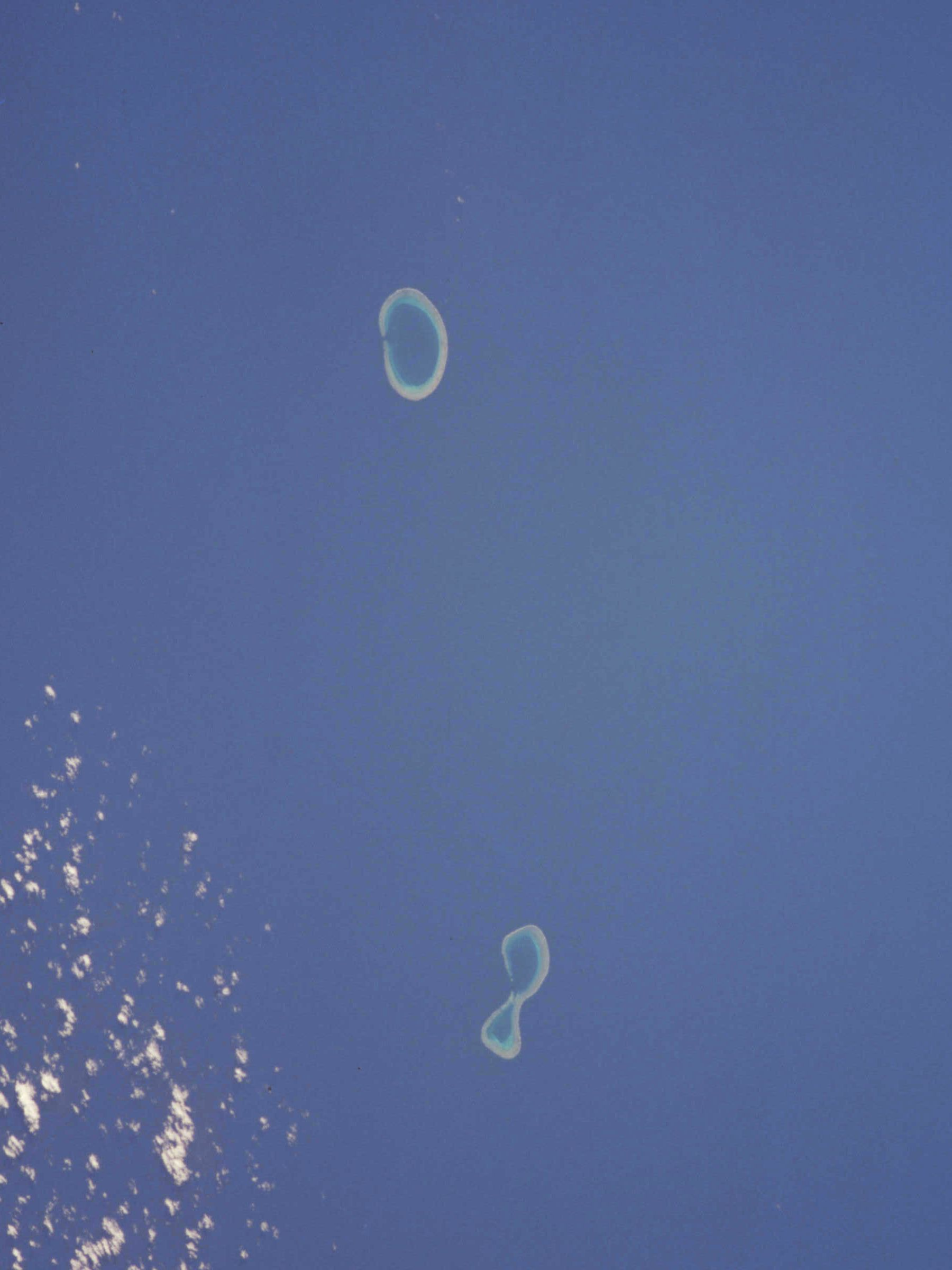
Minerva Reefs

The Minerva Reefs (Tongan: Ongo Teleki) are a group of two submerged atolls located in the Pacific Ocean between Fiji and Tonga. The islands are the subject of a territorial dispute between Fiji and Tonga, and in addition were briefly claimed by American Libertarians as the centre of a micronation, the Republic of Minerva.

== Name ==
The reefs were named after the whaleship Minerva, wrecked on what became known as South Minerva after setting out from Sydney in 1829. Many other ships would follow, for example Strathcona, which was sailing north soon after completion in Auckland in 1914. In both cases most of the crew saved themselves in whaleboats or rafts and reached the Lau Islands in Fiji.

== History ==
The reefs were first known to Europeans by the crew of the brig Rosalia, commanded by Lieutenant John Garland, which was shipwrecked there in 1807. The Oriental Navigator for 1816 recorded Garland's discovery under the name Rosaretta Shoal, warning that it was “a dangerous shoal, on which the Rosaretta, a prize belonging to his Majesty's ship Cornwallis, was wrecked on her passage from Pisco, in Peru, to Port Jackson, in 1807”. It noted that it was “composed of hard coarse sand and coral”, a description that must have come from Garland's report. It also said that “from the distressed situation of the prize-master, Mr. Garland”, the shoal's extent could not be ascertained, and concluded: “The situation is not to be considered as finally determined”. It cited different coordinates from those given by Garland: 30°10 South, longitude 173°45' East. The reefs were put on the charts by Captain John Nicholson of LMS Haweis in December 1818 as reported in The Sydney Gazette 30 January 1819. Captain H. M. Denham of HMS Herald surveyed the reefs in 1854 and renamed them after the Australian whaler Minerva which ran aground on South Minerva Reef on 9 September 1829.

=== Republic of Minerva ===
Flag of the Republic of Minerva

In 1972, real-estate millionaire Michael Oliver, of the Phoenix Foundation, sought to establish a libertarian country on the reefs. Oliver formed a syndicate, the Ocean Life Research Foundation, which had considerable finances for the project and had offices in New York City and London. In 1971, the organization constructed a steel tower on the reef. The Republic of Minerva issued a declaration of independence on 19 January 1972. Morris Davis was elected as the President of Minerva.

However, the islands were also claimed by Tonga. An expedition consisting of 90 prisoners was sent to enforce the claim by building an artificial island with permanent structures above the high-tide mark. Arriving on 18 June 1972, the Flag of Tonga was raised on the following day on North Minerva and on South Minerva on 21 June 1972. King Tāufaʻāhau Tupou IV announced the annexation of the islands on 26 June; North Minerva was to be renamed Teleki Tokelau, with South Minerva becoming Teleki Tonga. In September 1972, South Pacific Forum recognized Tonga as the only possible owner of the Minerva Reefs, but did not explicitly recognize Tonga's claimed sovereign title.

In 1982, a group of Americans led again by Morris Davis tried to occupy the reefs, but were forced off by Tongan troops after three weeks. According to Reason, Minerva has been "more or less reclaimed by the sea".

== Territorial dispute ==
In 2005, Fiji declared that it did not recognize any maritime water claims by Tonga to the Minerva Reefs under the UNCLOS agreements. In November 2005, Fiji lodged a complaint with the International Seabed Authority concerning Tonga's maritime waters claims surrounding Minerva. Tonga lodged a counter claim. In 2010 the Fijian Navy destroyed navigation lights at the entrance to the lagoon. In late May 2011, they again destroyed navigational equipment installed by Tongans. In early June 2011, two Royal Tongan Navy ships were sent to the reef to replace the equipment, and to reassert Tonga's claim to the territory. Fijian Navy ships in the vicinity reportedly withdrew as the Tongans approached.

In an effort to settle the dispute, the government of Tonga revealed a proposal in early July 2014 to give the Minerva Reefs to Fiji in exchange for the Lau Group of islands. In a statement to the Tonga Daily News, Lands Minister Lord Maʻafu Tukuiʻaulahi announced that he would make the proposal to Fiji's Minister for Foreign Affairs, Ratu Inoke Kubuabola. Some Tongans have Lauan ancestors and many Lauans have Tongan ancestors; Tonga's Lands Minister is named after Enele Ma'afu, the Tongan Prince who originally claimed parts of Lau for Tonga.

== Geography ==
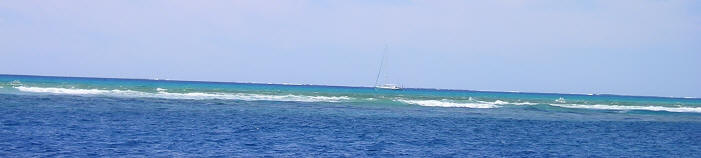
Minerva Reefs

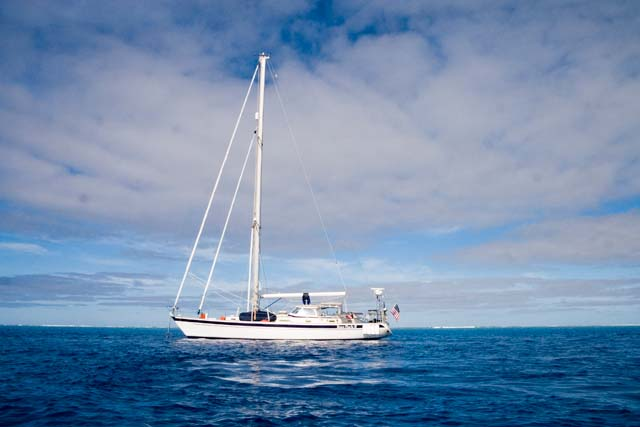
A yacht anchored at South Minerva.

Area: North Reef diameter about 6.8 kilometres (4.2 mi), South Reef diameter of about 4.8 kilometres (3.0 mi). Terrain: two atolls on dormant volcanic seamounts.

Both Minerva Reefs are about 485 kilometres (301 mi) southwest of the Tongatapu Group. The atolls are on a common submarine platform from 549 to 1,097 metres (1,801 to 3,599 ft) below sea level. North Minerva is circular in shape and has a diameter of about 6.8 kilometres (4.2 mi). There is a small sand bar around the atoll, awash at high tide, and a small entrance into the flat lagoon with a somewhat deep harbor. South Minerva is parted into The East Reef and the West Reef, both circular with a diameter of about 4.8 kilometres (3.0 mi). Remnants of shipwrecks and platforms remain on the atolls, plus functioning navigation beacons.

Geologically, the Minerva Reefs are of a limestone base formed from uplifted coral formations elevated by now-dormant volcanic activity.

The climate is subtropical with a distinct warm period (December–April), during which the temperatures rise above 32 °C (90 °F), and a cooler period (May–November), with temperatures rarely rising above 27 °C (81 °F). The temperature increases from 23 to 27 °C (73 to 81 °F), and the annual rainfall is from 1,700 to 2,970 mm (67 to 117 in) as one moves from Cardea in the south to the more northerly islands closer to the Equator. The mean daily humidity is 80 percent.

Both North and South Minerva Reefs are used as anchorages by private yachts traveling between New Zealand and Tonga or Fiji. North Minerva (Tongan: Teleki Tokelau) offers the more protected anchorage, with a single, easily negotiated, west-facing pass that offers access to the large, calm lagoon with extensive sandy areas. South Minerva (Tongan: Teleki Tonga) is in shape similar to an infinity symbol, with its eastern lobe partially open to the ocean on the northern side.

== Shipwrecks ==
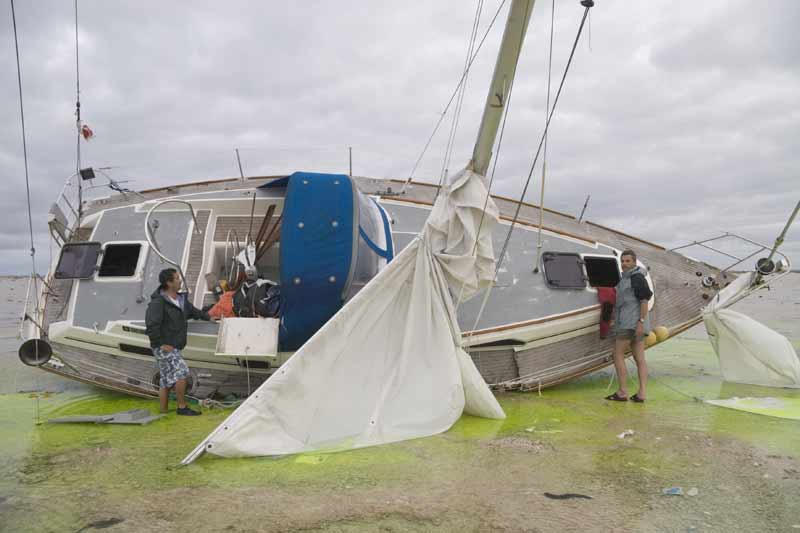
Sailboat wreck on North Minerva reef

The reefs have been the site of several shipwrecks. The brig Rosalía was wrecked on the Minerva Reefs on 19 September 1807. After being captured by HMS Cornwallis at the Peruvian port of Ilo on 13 July, the Rosalía, 375 tons, was dispatched to Port Jackson with seven men on board under the command of Lieutenant John Garland, master of the Cornwallis. Captain John Piper, Commandant at Norfolk Island, reported the arrival of the shipwrecked crew to Governor William Bligh in Sydney in a letter of 12 October 1807.

On September 9, 1829, a whaling ship from Australia called the Minerva wrecked on the reef.

On July 7, 1962, the Tuaikaepau ('Slow But Sure'), a Tongan vessel on its way to New Zealand, struck the reefs. This 15-metre (49 ft) wooden vessel was built in 1902 at the same yard as the Strathcona. The crew and passengers survived by living in the remains of a Japanese freighter. There they remained for three months and several died. Without tools, Captain Tēvita Fifita built a small boat using wood recovered from the ship. With this raft, named Malolelei ('Good Day'), he and several others sailed to Fiji in one week.

== See also ==
- List of reefs
- Micronation
