= Makira (disambiguation) =

Makira may refer to:

- Makira, an island in the Solomon Islands

- Makira-Ulawa Province, a province in the Solomon Islands

- Makira or Makura, an island in Vanuatu
- Makira Natural Park, a protected area in Madagascar

Given name

- Makira Cook (born 2001), American basketball player
