= Tongoa language =

Tongoa may be:

- Namakura language
- North Efate language

Cf. Tangoa language
