= Alexis Yolou =

New Hebridean politician

Member of the Representative Assembly
- In office 1979–1980
- Succeeded by: Jean-Marie Léyé
- Constituency: Tanna

Personal details
- Born: Lowanatom, New Hebrides
- Died: 11 June 1980; Isangel, New Hebrides
- Political party: John Frum Movement

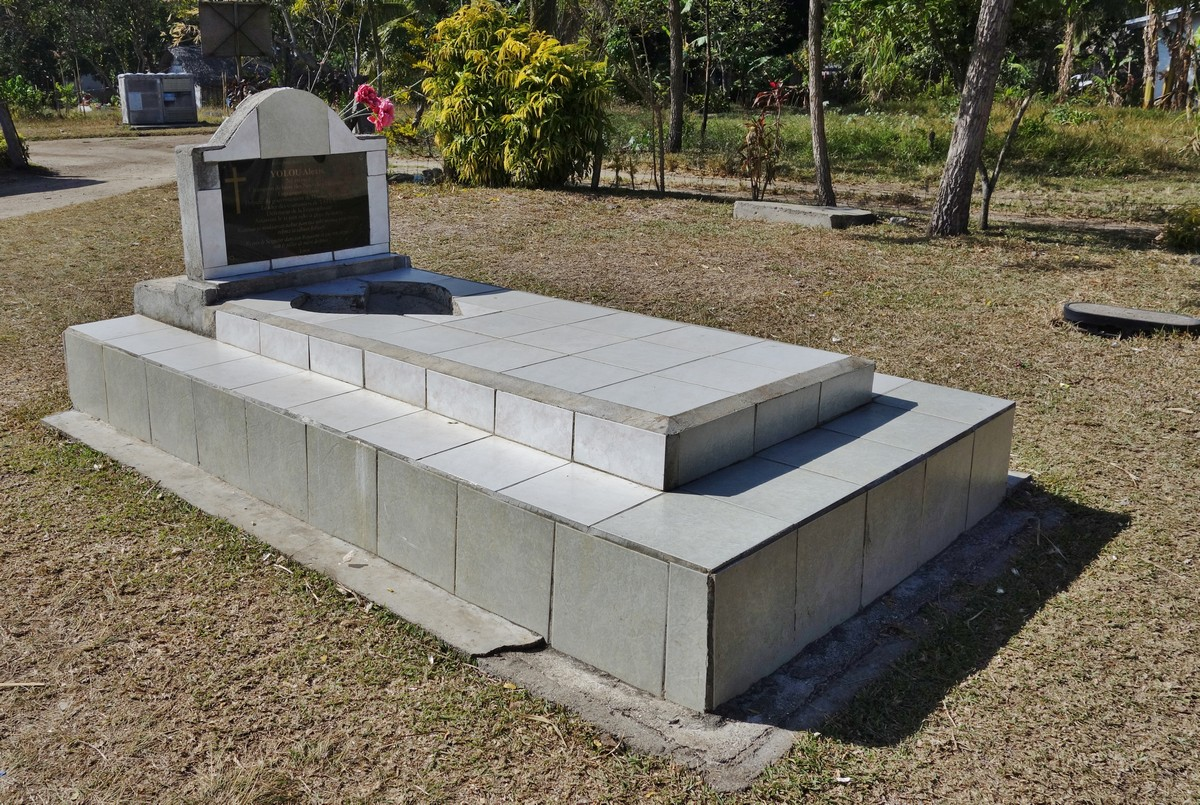
Tomb of Yolou in Tanna

Alexis Yolou (died 11 June 1980) was a New Hebridean politician. He was elected to the Representative Assembly in 1979 from the Tanna constituency, but was killed the following year as part of the civil strife on Tanna that resulted from the landslide victory of the Vanua'aku Pati.

== Biography ==
Yolou was born in Lowanatom, the son of Pierre Yamak and a cousin of Willie Korisa, who later became a government minister. He and was educated at the Montmartre school in Port Vila. A talented boxer, he was employed by boxing promoted Charlie Biddle as his assistant, and married a woman from Aneityum.

He joined the Francophone Union of the Communities of New Hebrides party at a young age, He lived on land of John Frum leader Niluan and eventually became the political spokesman for the John Frum movement on Tanna. He was elected to the House of Representatives from the Tanna constituency in the 1979 elections as a representative of the movement. However, his party boycotted the Assembly following the landslide win of the Vanua'aku Pati and Yolou did not attend its sittings.

John Frum members subsequently declared the independence of a new state named Tafea on 15 February. On 10 June 1980, Yolou convened a meeting of supporters in Sulphur Bay and marched on Isangel to try and free imprisoned supporters of the breakaway state. When they arrived, a firefight broke out and Yolou was found dead in the morning having been shot twice. His seat in the Assembly was left vacant until a 1982 by-election.
