= People's Provisional Government =

People's Provisional Government may refer to:

- People's Provisional Government of Mongolia (1921), Soviet-backed government formed by the Mongolian People's Party
- Vanuaaku People's Provisional Government (1977–1978), unrecognised predecessor to the Republic of Vanuatu
