= 1969 New Hebridean general election =

General elections were held in the New Hebrides in July and August 1969 to elect fourteen members of the thirty members of the Advisory Council.

== Background ==
In 1968 proposals were approved to increase the size of the Advisory Council from 26 to 30 members. The enlarged Council consisted of six 'official' members (the two Resident Commissioners, the British Assistant Commissioner, the French Chancelier, the Superintendent of Public Works and the Treasurer), ten nominated members (three British, three French and four Hebridean) and fourteen elected members, of which three would be British, three French and eight Hebridean. The six British and French representatives were elected indirectly by the Chamber of Commerce, with the Hebridean members elected by local councils and public meetings in areas where local councils did not exist.

== Results ==
Constituency	Elected member
Aniwa, Futuna, Aneityum and Erromango	William Mete
Aoba, Banks and Torres Islands	Michael Ala
Efate, Emau, Nguna and Mataso	George Kalkoa
Epi and Shepherd	Tom Tiplomata
Malekula	Frank Kenneth
Pentecost	Michael Liliu
Santo	Titus Path
Tanna	Iolu Abil
British members	James Burton
British members	W. Hamlym-Harris
British members	G. Seagoe
French members	P. Delacroix
French members	P. Lutgen
French members	J. Ratard
Source: Pacific Islands Monthly

=== Appointed members ===
Position	Member
British Resident Commissioner	Colin Allan
French Resident Commissioner	Jacques Mouradian
British nominated members	Roy Gubbay
British nominated members	R.U. Paul
British nominated members	D.A. Rawcliffe
French nominated members	Jean Chauveau
French nominated members	Jacques Russet
French nominated members	Father Verlingue
Hebridean nominated members	Madeline Kalchichi
Hebridean nominated members	Makau Kalsakau
Hebridean nominated members	Gérard Leymang
Hebridean nominated members	Michel Noel
Source: Pacific Islands Monthly

== Aftermath ==
The newly elected Advisory Council met for the first time on 1 October in Port Vila.
