= Tessa Fowler =

Vanuatuan politician

Member of the Representative Assembly
- In office 1975–
- Constituency: Port Vila

Tessa Fowler is a Vanuatuan former politician. She and Mary Gilu were the first women elected to the New Hebrides Representative Assembly in 1975.

== Biography ==
Born Tessa Franklin, Fowler earned an MA in philosophy, politics and economics at the University of Oxford. She subsequently worked as a researcher in the United States and England. She relocated to the New Hebrides in 1958 to work as an economist for the British administration. Although she moved onto Hong Kong in 1959 and then returned to England, she returned to the New Hebrides permanently in 1961. She ran two trading stores and earned money from translating. In 1964 she was the first person to be employed by the new Chambers of Commerce. She also became a dealer of local artwork, selling to foreign museums. In addition, she wrote articles for Pacific Islands Monthly and in 1971 began contributing to Nakamiel, a monthly news magazine. She married an Australian builder and artist.

A member of the Union of the Communities of the New Hebrides (UCHN), Fowler was elected to the municipal council of Port Vila in the 1975 local elections in a seat reserved for British nationals. She was subsequently contested the Port Vila constituency for the UCNH in the November 1975 legislative elections. Alongside Mary Gilu, she was one of the first two women elected to the territory's legislature.
