= Gilu =

Gilu may refer to:

- Gilu Joseph (born 1999), Malayali poet and lyricist
- Mary Gilu, Vanuatuan politician
