= Michael Ala =

Vanuatuan politician

Member of the Advisory Council
- In office 1969–1975
- Constituency: Aoba, Banks and Torres Islands
- In office 1964–1969
- Constituency: Northern

Personal details
- Born: 30 March 1923; Ambae, New Hebrides
- Died: 4 January 1985 (aged 61); Ambae, Vanuatu

Michael Ala MBE (30 March 1923 – 4 January 1985) was a Vanuatuan medical practitioner, clergyman and politician. He served as a member of the Advisory Council from 1964 to 1975.

== Biography ==
Ala was born in Saranambuga in Ambae in 1923. He was educated at the Melanesian Mission School at Pawa in the Solomon Islands and Queen Victoria School in Fiji. He qualified as a medical practitioner at the Central Medical School in Suva and returned to the New Hebrides to work in Port Vila as part of the British National Medical Service. He married May Banivagahao in 1950; the couple had six children. After working at the Paton Memorial Hospital as an assistant medical practitioner, in 1954 he was posted to Ambae to set up a local clinic. He later became an Anglican priest.

In 1962 he became the first chairman of Ambae local council, a position he held for 13 years. In 1964 he was elected to the Advisory Council by Northern District Council. He was re-elected in direct elections in 1969, representing the constituency of Ambae, Banks and Torres Islands. He was awarded an MBE in the 1971 Birthday Honours. He contested the Ambae–Maevo constituency in the 1975 elections as an independent, but failed to be elected. He later joined the Vanua'aku Pati.

In 1979 he served as a member of the commission of enquiry into violence on Tanna. He died on Ambae in January 1985 at the age of 62.
