= 1975 New Hebridean general election =

← 1969	10 November 1975	1977 →
- All 29 seats in the Representative Assembly; 15 seats needed for a majority
- Turnout: 40,174 (88.80%)
Party	Leader	Vote %	Seats
National Party	Walter Lini	54.19	17
UCNH	Remy Delaveuve	30.53	10
MANH	Michel Thevenin	8.05	2
This lists parties that won seats. See the complete results below.

General elections were held for the first time in the New Hebrides on 10 November 1975. The result was a victory for the New Hebrides National Party, which won 17 seats in the new Representative Assembly.

== Background ==
The elections were held following a 1974 agreement between France and the United Kingdom on the territory's future. The agreement provided for the replacement of the Advisory Council with an assembly with increased powers and elected by universal suffrage. The election date in November was agreed on 11 July 1975.

The 41-member Representative Assembly had 29 directly-elected members, six members representing the Chamber of Commerce (three British and three French), four representatives of customary chiefs and three representing co-operatives. The directly-elected members were elected from 14 constituencies with between one and five seats. In 12 constituencies the members were elected by single non-transferable vote, while in two seats (Port Vila and Santo Town), multiple non-transferable vote was used, with voters allowed to case as many votes as there were seats.

== Campaign ==
Fearing a victory for the New Hebrides National Party and reluctant to sanction independence due to fears that it may encourage similar sentiments in French Polynesia and New Caledonia, the French element of the joint administration gave support to the European-backed Union of the Communities of the New Hebrides (UCNH). Aircraft hired from New Caledonia were used to campaign around the islands, with the French High Commissioner of New Caledonia involved. Seven planeloads of New Hebrideans were also flown from New Caledonia to vote, with electoral regulations changed on election day to allow the practice.

== Results ==
=== Directly-elected seats ===
Party	Votes	%	Seats
New Hebrides National Party	27,978	54.19	17
Union of the Communities of the New Hebrides	15,761	30.53	10
Movement for the Autonomy of the New Hebrides	4,155	8.05	2
Nagriamel	650	1.26	0
MANH–Tabwemasana–Nagriamel	678	1.31	0
Friend Melanesian Party	457	0.89	0
Tabwemasana	331	0.64	0
Independents	1,620	3.14	0
Total	51,630	100.00	29
Valid votes	34,911	97.86	
Invalid/blank votes	763	2.14	
Total votes	35,674	100.00	
Registered voters/turnout	40,174	88.80	
Source: Plant

=== Chamber of Commerce seats ===
British members		French members	
Candidate	Votes	Candidate	Votes
Chung Wai	217	R. Bacon	241
René Ah Pow	202	R. Keller	218
John Stegler	199	Philippe Delacroix	168
J. Seagoe	143	B. Wong	140
D. Curtis	118	J. Russet	84
J. Miu Mah Kam	65	R. Coulon	74
J. Leveredge	56	C. van Nerum	54
R. Gallimore	49	J. Simonsen	38
D. Joffick	27	C. Boudier	38
H. Hamlin	19	Thevenin	17
Source: Plant

== Aftermath ==
Following the victory of the New Hebrides National Party, the authorities sought to try to avoid pro-independence factions holding a majority in the Assembly. No date was set for the opening meeting of the Assembly due to disputes over the election of the chiefs. Following several months of delay, the French High Commissioner proposed increasing the number of chiefs from four to eight. The UCNH later called for the number to be increased to ten.

Protests were held by supporters of the National Party on 27 March 1976. In Pacific Islands Monthly, a member of the National Party claimed that the French authorities had encouraged people to disrupt the demonstrations, with 54 people attached in Espiritu Santo.

In May 1976, six months after voting had taken place, the election of four members in Espiritu Santo – Mary Gilu, Titus Path and Thomas Reuben of the National Party and Michel Thevenin of MANH – was annulled. An appeal to Joint Court in July was unsuccessful, with the court also annulling the election of Philibert de Montgremier, another National Party candidate. By-elections for the seats were held between 25 and 27 October; Gilu, Path and Reuben were re-elected, while de Montgremier was defeated by George Cronsteadt of MANH–Nagramiel. Thevenin was replaced as the MANH–Nagramiel candidate by Jimmy Stevens, who was also elected.

An incomplete Assembly finally met on 29 June. At the first meeting it was agreed that the number of chiefs should remain at four. The National Party also attempted to pass a motion of no confidence in the British and French administrators, which was left unresolved. The final unfilled seat – the chief representing Northern District, was elected on 26 November following a delay caused by Nagramiel chiefs complaining that others were not wearing traditional dress. National Party supporter Moli Liu Tamata was elected, giving the party 21 of the 42 seats (16 directly elected, three chiefs and two co-operative members); the UCNH had twelve seats, MANH–Nagramiel three and the remaining six were independents.

The first official meeting of the complete Assembly took place on 29 November, over a year after the initial elections. A motion calling for all seats to be elected by universal suffrage at the next election was passed unanimously. However, the Assembly was suspended in March 1977 following a boycott by the National Party. Early elections were held in late 1977.

== See also ==
- List of members of the Representative Assembly of the New Hebrides (1975–1977)
