= Makura =

Island in Vanuatu

Native name: Emwae, Makira
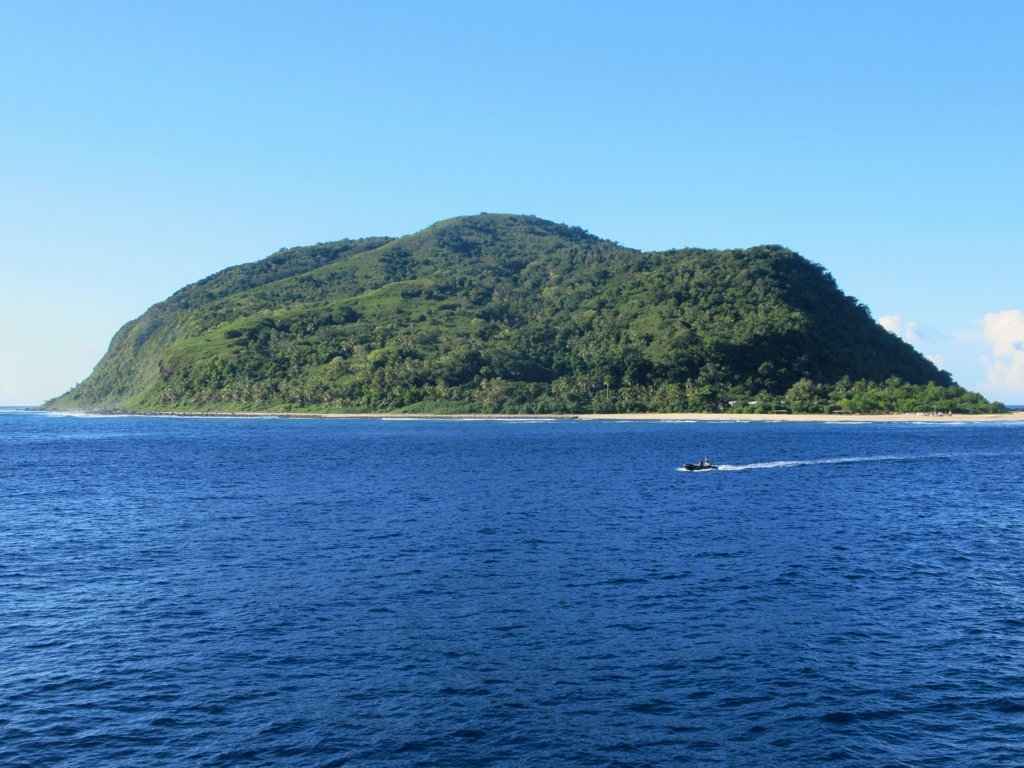
- NW side
- Interactive map of Makura

Geography
- Location: Pacific Ocean
- Coordinates: 17°8′00″S 168°26′00″E
- Archipelago: Vanuatu, Shepherds Islands
- Highest elevation: 132 m (433 ft)

Administration
- Vanuatu
- Province: Shefa Province

Demographics
- Population: 93 (2015)
- Languages: Namakura or Namakir.

Makura, locally known as Makira, is a small, inhabited island in Shefa Province of Vanuatu in the Pacific Ocean. Makura is a part of the Shepherd Islands archipelago.

== Geography ==
The estimated terrain elevation above the sea level is some 132 meters. Makura is a peak of a primeval volcano. The other existing ramparts of the ancient volcanic rim are considered to be the neighboring islands of Emae and Mataso.

== Population ==
As of 2015, the official local population was 93 people in 19 households. The island's main language is Namakura or Namakir.
