= Harry D. Schultz =

American investment adviser (1923–2023)

Harry Donald Schultz (September 11, 1923 – February 22, 2023) was an American investment adviser and author who published The International Harry Schultz Letter for 45 years. He learned to trade while serving in the United States Army in Shanghai and on his return to the US bought and sold small newspapers, 13 in all. He spent the rest of his career advising on investments and writing books and his eponymous newsletter. Schultz was closely associated with libertarian causes.

== Early life ==
Schultz was born in September 1923 in Milwaukee, Wisconsin. He served in the United States Army during the Second World War when he was stationed in Shanghai and began to trade shares on the Shanghai Stock Exchange. He discovered that he could make money even in a foreign environment: "I bought and sold silk, bank shares, currency and made a small fortune (very small) in a high inflation economy. I also bought and sold gold coins and bars."

== Newspaper career ==
As a child he had produced a newspaper for his family, neighbours and school using a typewriter and later a mimeograph machine. In the Army, he read voraciously and planned to buy a real newspaper on his discharge with the money he had made from trading. He managed to accumulate enough for a down-payment on a weekly newspaper in Palm Springs, California, which he turned into a daily and sold to The Sun. He owned a further twelve newspapers during his involvement with that business, specialising in buying small papers, improving them and selling them on.

== Writing ==
Schultz published The International Harry Schultz Letter for 45 years, starting around 1963. It was known for its somewhat folksy and eccentric tone. Readers were said by The Times in 1968 to include Enoch Powell and Richard Nixon, while New Internationalist magazine in 1981 named Margaret Thatcher, Sir Keith Joseph, South African finance minister Owen Horwood and Saudi Arabian oil minister Ahmed Zaki Yamani as readers. In addition to his newsletter, Schultz is known for his advice on investing in bear markets which he first wrote about in his 1964 book, Bear markets: how to survive and make money in them. He expanded on his ideas of profiting from adversity in his 1972 book, Panics & crashes and how you can make money out of them. His 1964 book was reprinted and updated in 2002 as Bear market investing strategies.

Schultz appeared in the Guinness Book of World Records as the most highly paid investment consultant in the world and, according to Schultz, he was the model for the character of Lewis Dorsey in Arthur Hailey's bestselling novel The Moneychangers, who also writes a financial newsletter.

== Libertarianism and political views ==
Schultz was associated with the libertarian movement and wrote a guide to using Swiss banks. He is credited with inventing the Three Flags Theory which proposes that everyone should have a second passport, an address in a tax haven and that their assets should be kept outside their home country. According to New Internationalist magazine, he was one of the trustees of the Phoenix Foundation which unsuccessfully attempted to establish small libertarian states in the 1970s. In 1991, he produced On re-making the world: Cut nations down to size, which argued that there were too many large and inefficiently run nations in the world and that they should be broken up to encourage peace, prosperity and better government.

Often gloomy about the future, Schultz, advocated a return to the gold standard and sound money. In 1982, The Observer said that his "record as a prophet of doom is probably second to none" and reported that a group known as the Friends of Harry Schultz had met in Cannes to plan for upcoming trouble by "establishing alternative identities (with appropriate passports), building nuclear shelters, setting up their own bank, learning to fly their own planes, and sail their own boats, locating isolated hide-outs, and assembling survival kits".

== Personal life and death ==
In 1975, it was reported that Schultz was engaged to Princess Sonia Shirinsky.

Schultz died at his home in Monaco on February 22, 2023, at the age of 99.

== Selected publications ==
- Bear markets: how to survive and make money in them. Prentice-Hall, Englewood Cliffs, N.J., 1964.
- A treasury of Wall Street wisdom. Investors' Press, Palisades Park, N.J., 1966. (edited with Samson Coslow)
- Handbook for using & understanding Swiss Banks. 1970.
- Panics & crashes and how you can make money out of them. Arlington House, New Rochelle, N.Y., 1972. ISBN 0870001477
- Financial tactics and terms for the sophisticated international investor. Harper & Row, New York, 1974. ISBN 9780060138080
- On re-making the world: Cut nations down to size. International Commission for the De-Centralization of the World's Nations/Bartelby, 1991. ISBN 978-0963071606
- Bear market investing strategies. John Wiley, Chichester, 2002. ISBN 978-0470847022
