= Mataso =

Island in Vanuatu

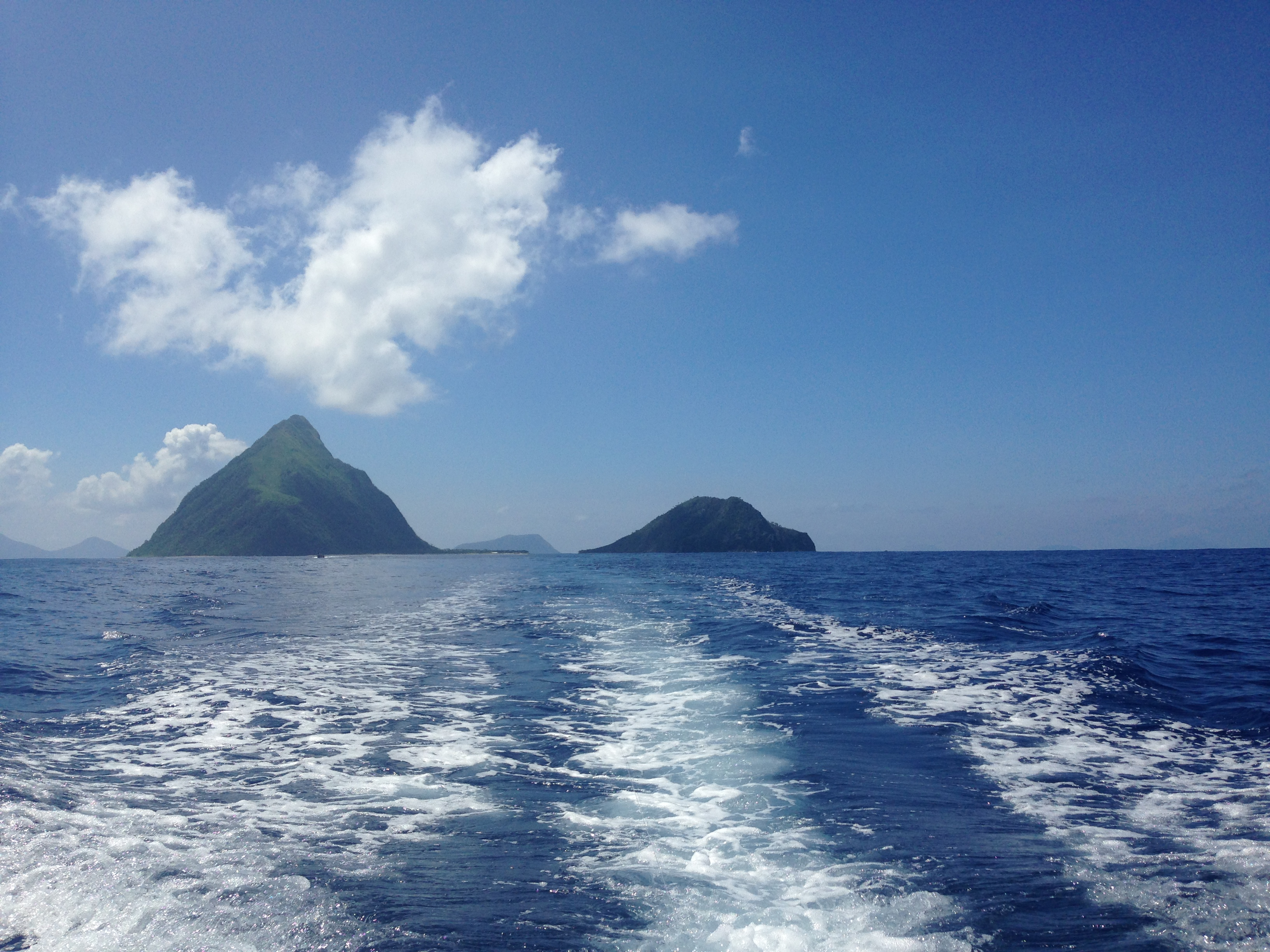
- A view on Mataso (2016).
- Interactive map of Mataso

Geography
- Location: Pacific Ocean
- Coordinates: 17°15′10″S 168°25′30″E
- Archipelago: Vanuatu, Shepherd Islands
- Highest elevation: 45 m (148 ft)
- Highest point: Matah'Alam

Administration
- Vanuatu
- Province: Shefa Province

Demographics
- Population: 61 (2015)

Mataso is an island in the Shefa of Vanuatu in the Pacific Ocean. The island is a part of Shepherd Islands archipelago.

== Geography ==
The island of Mataso is located 11 km (6.8 mi) south of Makira. It is formed by two hills separated by white sandy beaches known as Matah Susum (Small Mataso) and Matah 'Ahlam (Big Mataso), so the island was as "Two Hills" by early explorers. Matah'Alam is the highest peak at 650 m (2,130 ft). The estimated terrain elevation above the sea level is some 45 metres (148 ft). The nearest islands are Makura and Emae. Mataso is widely known for its broad marine resources with rich coral reefs around the coast and a wide variety of game shipping options out on the open sea.

== Population ==
As of 2015, the island supports a population of about 61 in 12 households. The main settlement is Na'asang. The principal economic activity is subsistence agriculture and Fisheries. The GDP of the island is $457 per capita. The island's language, also called Namakura, as its also used by parts of Emae, Makira, Buniga, Tongariki and parts of Tongoa. Many of the islanders now live in Port Vila by the area of Ohlen Mataso.
