= Coconut War =

1980 rebellion in Vanuatu

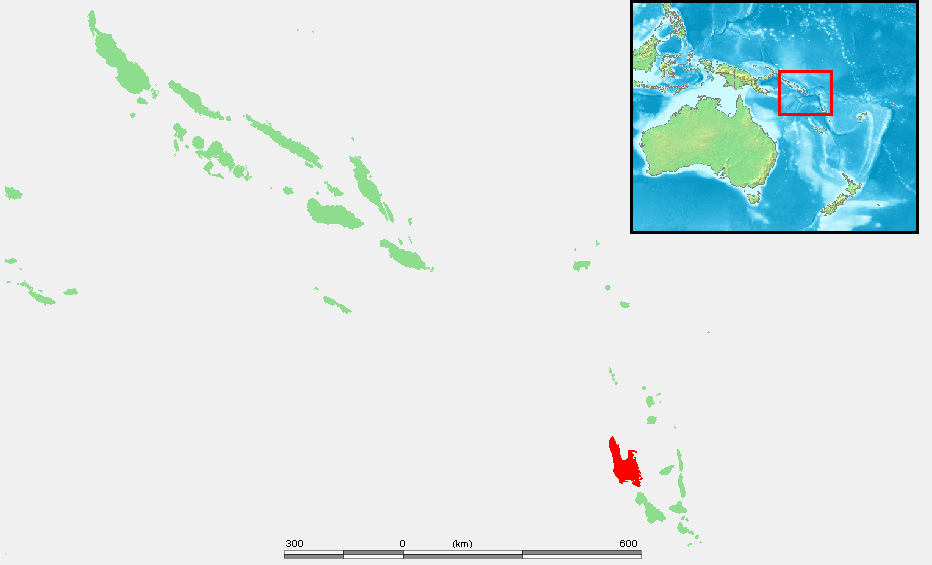
- Map of Espiritu Santo inside Vanuatu
Date	August 1980
Location	Espiritu Santo, Vanuatu
Result	Vanuatuan, Papua New Guinean and Solomon Islander victory

Belligerents
Vanuatu; Papua New Guinea; Solomon Islands; United Kingdom; France	Nagriamel rebels Support: French residents Phoenix Foundation

Commanders and leaders
(Vanuatu) Ati George Sokomanu (Vanuatu) Walter Lini (Papua New Guinea) Sir Tore Lokoloko (Papua New Guinea) Sir Julius Chan (Solomon Islands) Baddeley Devesi (Solomon Islands) Sir Peter Kenilorea (United Kingdom) Andrew Stuart (United Kingdom) Charles Guthrie (United Kingdom) Colin Halgill (France) François Mitterrand (France) Raymond Barre (France) Jacques Robert	Jimmy Stevens (POW)

The Coconut War was a brief clash between Papua New Guinean soldiers and rebels in Espiritu Santo shortly before and after the independence of the Republic of Vanuatu was declared on 30 July 1980.

== Background ==
Prior to Vanuatu's independence, the islands were known as the New Hebrides. The New Hebrides were governed by a condominium of France and the United Kingdom. In 1980, France and the United Kingdom agreed that Vanuatu would be granted independence on 30 July 1980.

Beginning in June 1980, Jimmy Stevens, head of the Nagriamel movement, led an uprising against the colonial officials and the plans for independence. The uprising lasted about 12 weeks. The rebels blockaded Santo-Pekoa International Airport, destroyed two bridges, and declared the independence of Espiritu Santo island as the "State of Vemerana". Stevens was supported by French-speaking landowners, residents in some of the francophone and kastom villages on Santo, some Asian residents, and by the Phoenix Foundation, an American business foundation that supported the establishment of a libertarian tax haven in the New Hebrides.

== Confrontation ==
On 8 June 1980, the New Hebrides government asked Britain and France to send troops to put down a rebellion on the island of Espiritu Santo. France and Britain sent troops but the French refused to allow them to take any effective action against the rebels. As independence day neared, the Prime Minister-elect, Walter Lini, asked Papua New Guinea if it would send troops to intervene, which was approved by Prime Minister Julius Chan. As Papua New Guinean soldiers began arriving in Espiritu Santo, the foreign press began referring to the ongoing events as the "Coconut War". (This nomenclature was popularised by Shears (1980) – in Vanuatu, it is known much more widely as "The Santo Rebellion", cf. Beasant (1984).) The conflict became the first time that the Papua New Guinea Defence Force was deployed overseas.

However, the "war" was brief and unconventional. The residents of Espiritu Santo generally welcomed the Papua New Guineans as fellow Melanesians. Stevens's followers were armed with only bows and arrows, rocks, and slings. There were few casualties, and the war came to a sudden end: when a vehicle carrying Stevens's son burst through a Papua New Guinean roadblock in late August 1980, the soldiers opened fire on the vehicle, killing Stevens's son. On 28 August, Jimmy Stevens surrendered, stating that he had never intended that anyone be harmed.

At Stevens's trial, the support of the Phoenix Foundation to the Nagriamel movement was revealed. It was also revealed that the French government had secretly supported Stevens in his efforts. Stevens was sentenced to 14 years' imprisonment; he remained in prison until 1991.
