= Mary Gilu =

Vanuatuan politician

Member of the Representative Assembly
- In office 1975–1977
- Constituency: Santo Town

Mary Laufa Gilu is a Vanuatuan former politician. She and Tessa Fowler were the first women elected to the New Hebrides Representative Assembly, serving from 1975 to 1977.

== Biography ==
After working as a staff nurse for the British Solomon Islands government, Gilu attended the SPC Community Education Training Centre, graduating in 1965. She subsequently became an assistant women's interests officer in Honiara, She later married Francis Gilu, a vicar, and moved to the New Hebrides.

She became a member of the New Hebrides National Party and contested the Santo Town constituency in the November 1975 elections. Although she was elected to the Representative Assembly, in May 1976, her election – and that of three other members – was annulled. An appeal to Joint Court in July was unsuccessful, but Gilu was re-elected in the by-elections on 25 October, increasing her majority.

The National Party boycotted the 1977 elections and Gilu lost her seat. Following independence she worked as a civil servant, becoming a social skills social development coordinator for the Ministry of Education, Youth and Sports. In 1982 she was awarded the Vanuatu Independence Medal by President Ati George Sokomanu.
