= Vanuaaku People's Provisional Government =

Rendering of the provisional government's flag, based on that of the Vanua'aku Pati

The Vanuaaku People's Provisional Government (VPPG) was an provisional government in the New Hebrides Condominium (present-day Vanuatu) from November 1977 to May 1978.

The PPG was created by the pro-independence Vanua'aku Pati to accompany its boycott of the 1977 New Hebridean general election.

== Background ==
In February 1977, the pro-independence Vanua'aku Pati (VP) withdrew its representatives from the New Hebrides Representative Assembly in protest at the continuation of six reserved seats for the Chamber of Commerce, representing the small European population. Their withdrawal made the Assembly inquorate and resulted in its dissolution by the condominium authorities.

On 9 October 1977, Barak Sopé announced at a public rally in Vila that the VP would established a provisional government if the administration went ahead with the planned elections.

== Proclamation and leadership ==
The People's Provisional Government was declared on 29 November 1977, one day after the boycotted general election.

The VVPG used a parallel structure to the VP's leadership. Its cabinet included:

- President: Walter Lini
- Vice-President: Maraki Timakata
- Secretary-General: Barak Sopé
- Vice-Chairman of the Executive Council: George Kalkoa
- Secretary for Finance: William Edgell
- Secretary for Community Affairs: Donald Kalpokas
- Secretary for Information: Kalkot Matas

== Activities ==
The VPPG assumed control over most of the New Hebrides outside of the urban areas of Vila and Santo.

The VPPG occupied or supported the occupation of foreign-owned plantations, which continued to operate and produce copra for export.

== Suspension and aftermath ==
The VPPG was suspended on 11 May 1978 following an agreement between the VP and Kalsakau's government to form an ad hoc committee of 15 members to progress electoral reform. Despite holding only four positions on the committee, the VP secured its desired reforms including a winner-takes-all system that would allow the party to form a stable government upon independence. The French authorities subsequently stalled plans for the next general election on the basis that a census would need to be conducted beforehand, causing the VP to threaten to revive the provisional government. A government of national unity was eventually established on 27 December 1978, with Kalsakau replaced as chief minister by Gérard Leymang and equal representation from the VP and the parties of the Representative Assembly.

== Sources ==
- Jupp, James; Sawer, Marian (1979). "New Hebrides 1978–79: Self‐government by whom and for whom?". The Journal of Pacific History. 14 (2): 208–220. doi:10.1080/00223347908572377.
- Plant, Christopher (1978). "New Hebrides 1977: Year of Crisis". The Journal of Pacific History. 13 (4): 194–204. doi:10.1080/00223347808572356.
