= Emae =

- Island
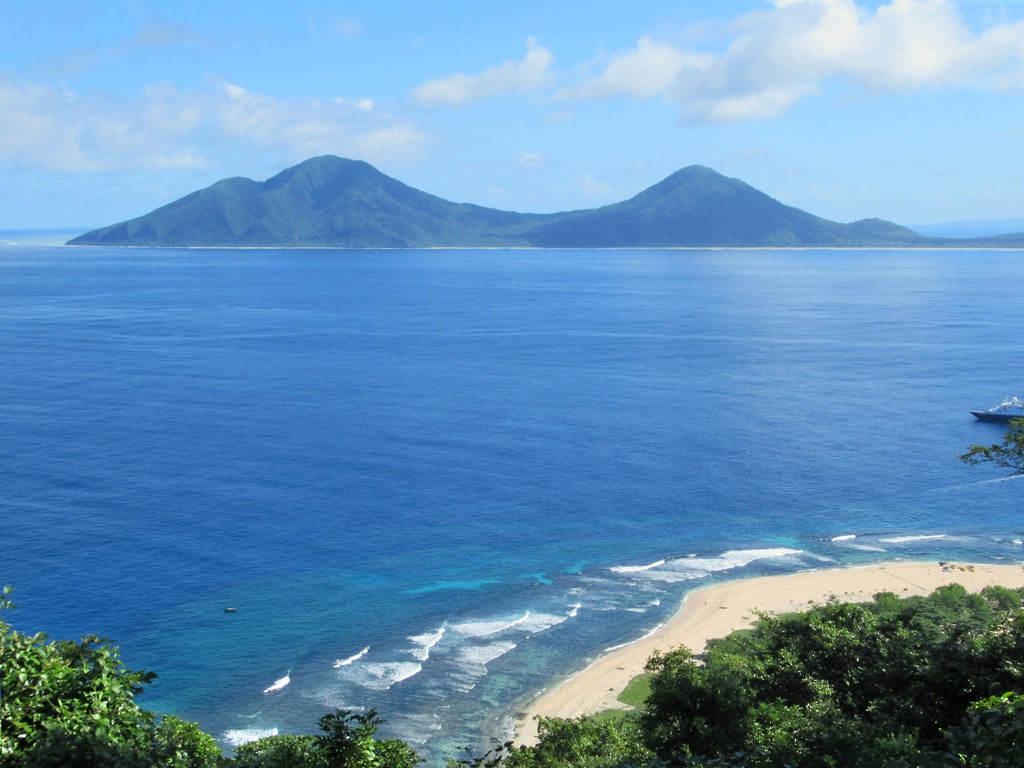
- A view of the East part of Emae as seen from Makura.

- Location in Vanuatu
- Coordinates: 17°4′00″S 168°22′30″E
- Country: Vanuatu
- Province: Shefa Province

Area
  - Total: 32 km^{2} (12 sq mi)
- Highest elevation: 644 m (2,113 ft)

Population (2009)
  - Total: 743
  - Density: 23/km^{2} (60/sq mi)
- Time zone: UTC+11 (VUT)

Emae is an island in the Shepherd Islands, Shefa, Vanuatu.

== Geography ==
Maunga Lasi is the highest peak at 644 m. It forms the northern rim of the (mostly) underwater volcano of Makura, which also covers the nearby islands of Makura and Mataso. It is 10 km (6 mi) long and up to 5 km (3 mi) wide, with an area of 32 square kilometres (12 square miles).

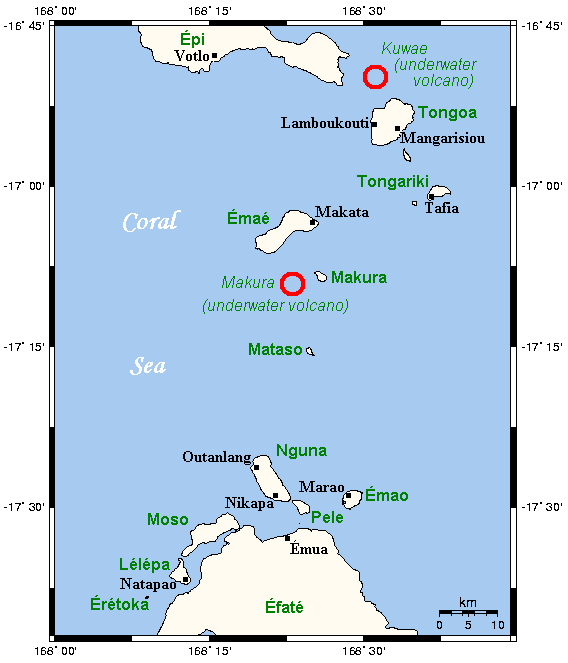
Shepherd Islands

== Population ==
The island supports a population of about 750, growing at 3.1% per year. The main settlement is Makata. The principal economic activity is subsistence agriculture. The GDP of the island is $457 per capita. Unlike the surrounding islands populated by Melanesians, Emae and Makura are Polynesian outliers. The island's language, also called Emae, is in the Futunic language family, which includes most of the outliers in Vanuatu. North Efate, one of the other languages of the archipelago, is used as a second language. Many of the islanders now live in Port Vila. The crowning of four Emae chiefs in 2004 occurred there, and many of the tribal chiefs live there.

== Transportation ==
The island has an airport, Aromai Airport, Siwo (IATA: EAE, ICAO: NVSE). The nearby Cook's Reef is a popular dive site.

== See also ==
- Polynesian outliers
