= Nagriamel =

- Leader: John Lum
- Founded: January 1966
- Ideology: Ni-Vanuatu traditionalism Espiritu Santo autonomy Regionalism; Cultural conservatism Economic liberalism Welfarism
- Political position: Center to center-right
- Parliament: 1 / 52

Proposed flag of the Republic of Vemerana (1980)

Nagriamel (sometimes seen as Vemarana, Vemerana or the Nagriamel Customs Union or Nagriamel Movement) is a political party in Vanuatu.

== History ==
The party was established in January 1966 at a meeting of chiefs in Espiritu Santo convened by Chief Buluk of Big Bay. The first territory-wide political movement in the New Hebrides, by 1969 it was estimated to have around 10,000 members (around one in eight of the population), mostly in the north of the territory. The name 'Nagriamel' was taken from combining the names of two plants, nagria (a croton) and mel (a cycas). Soon after its establishment, Jimmy Stevens became involved with the party after offering to sell guns to the chiefs. He used much of the funds donated to the party to build an agricultural complex in Vanafo.

The party called for the return of all European-owned land that had not been used for agricultural development, It also held the view that the New Hebrides was not ready for independence and the modernization it would bring, though the party was reputedly manipulated by anti-independence French factions and the Phoenix Foundation. In the 1975 elections, the party won two of the 29 popularly elected seats in the new Representative Assembly.

As the independence movement gathered momentum after 1975, led by the more Anglo-centric Walter Lini and the Vanua'aku Pati, Nagriamel sought to delay the end of British–French condominium. With backing from the Phoenix Foundation, Nagriamel declared the independence of the 'Republic of Vemerana' on Santo on the eve of independence in 1980. Vanua'aku Party and Papua New Guinean soldiers quashed the new state weeks later. Reprisals against Nagriamel supporters spread throughout the northern islands.

Following independence, the party contested the 1983 elections, winning one seat, taken by Harry Karaeu. This seat was lost in the 1987 elections, but the party won a seat again in the 1991 elections. The party retained its single seat in the 1995 elections, but lost their parliamentary representation in the 1998 elections. It regained a seat in the 2008 elections, with Havo Moli elected in Malo/Aore. Moli was subsequently appointed Minister for Agriculture.

In the 2012 elections, the party won three seats, with Moli joined in parliament by Samson Samsen and John Lum. It retained all three seats in the 2016 elections before losing two in 2020. In the 2022 election the party retained its only seat and remained in the opposition.

The party tends to support Vanuatu's status as a tax haven as well as private enterprise, but is in favour of free education and health care (generally a position popular on the left), and is against modern individualism corrupting customary values.

In 2024, John Lum was elected as the party's new president. Lum won the only seat for Nagriamel in the 2025 election. In accordance with the results of the 2024 Vanuatuan constitutional referendum, Lum was forced to affiliate with a larger party, and chose the Land and Justice Party.

== Election results ==
Parliament
Election	Leader	Votes	%	Seats	+/–	Government
1975	Jimmy Stevens	650	1.26 (#4)	0 / 29	New	Extra-parliamentary
1977	Jimmy Stevens	Boycotted		0 / 38	0	Extra-parliamentary
1979	Jimmy Stevens	Did not contest		0 / 39	0	Extra-parliamentary
1983	Jimmy Stevens	1,254	2.84 (#4)	1 / 39	▲1	Opposition
1987	Jimmy Stevens	766	1.36 (#1)	0 / 46	▼0	Extra-parliamentary
1991	Jimmy Stevens	1,822	2.93 (#6)	1 / 46	▲1	Opposition
1995	?	1,337	1.76 (#1)	1 / 50	0	Opposition
1998	?	162	0.23 (#13)	0 / 52	▼1	Extra-parliamentary
2002	?	505	0.64 (#14)	0 / 52	0	Extra-parliamentary
2004	?	405	0.44 (#16)	0 / 52	0	Extra-parliamentary
2008	?	3,016	2.87 (#10)	1 / 52	▲1	Coalition
2012	?	5,092	4.23 (#7)	3 / 52	▲2	Coalition
2016	Moli Abel Nako	4,128	3.65 (#9)	3 / 52	0	Coalition
2020	Song Keaspai	2,980	2.07 (#10)	1 / 52	▼2	Opposition
2022	Song Keaspai	3,240	2.45 (#9)	1 / 52	0	Opposition
2025	John Lum	3,102	2.12 (#10)	1 / 52	0	Opposition

== See also ==
- Turaga nation
