= 1977 New Hebridean general election =

General Elections

Early general elections were held in the New Hebrides on 29 November 1977 following the dissolution of the Representative Assembly elected in 1975 due to the Vanua'aku Pati blocking its work in order to protest the inclusion of members elected by the Chamber of Commerce.

The Vanua'aku Pati and other pro-independence parties boycotted the elections, meaning no seats were contested. The result was a victory for the francophone Tanunion. Nagriamel emerged as the second-largest party with seven seats.

== Background ==
After the elections were announced, the Vanua'aku Pati issued a list of five demands that if not met, would result in them boycotting the elections. The demands were that voting rights be restricted to the indigenous population, the voting age be reduced to 18, a party winning a majority of seats be able to form a government alone, that the new government should have the powers required for self-government, and that an independence referendum be held by the end of the year.

== Results ==
Of the 38 members elected, 26 were new to the Assembly.

Nagriamel won seven seats and the Natatok Efate party won five. Other parties that won seats included the Movement for the Autonomy of the New Hebrides (MANH), Tanunion (a successor to the UCNH) and the Federation of Independents (FEDIP).

A majority group of 21 representatives was established by Tanunion, Natatok Efate and two independents. FEDIP, the MANH and Nagriamel joined with three independents to form an opposition bloc holding the remaining 17 seats.

== Aftermath ==
On election day the Vanua'aku Pati announced the establishment of the Vanuaaku People's Provisional Government, raising its flag at 47 of 50 party locations. It subsequently which took control of large areas of several islands until it was dissolved in May 1978.

When the newly elected Assembly met, Maxime Carlot Korman was elected as its president. George Kalsakau of Natatok Efate was appointed as the first Chief Minister, heading a seven-member Council of Ministers including four members of the Tanunion/Natatko Efate group and two members of the FEDIP/MANH group.

Kalsakau cabinet
Position	Minister
Chief Minister	George Kalsakau
Minister for Finance	Guy Prévot
Minister for Internal Affairs	Vincent Boulekone
Minister for Natural Resources	Albert Ravuti
Minister for Social Affairs	Gérard Leymang
Minister for Trade, Industry and Tourism	Aimé Maleré

On 15 December 1978 Kalsakau lost a motion of no confidence by thirty votes to six, and was removed as Chief Minister; the following day he was appointed as the Speaker of the Assembly. On 21 December he was succeeded as Chief Minister by Gérard Leymang who formed a unity government including the Vanua'aku Pati. Vanua'aku Pati leader Walter Lini was appointed Deputy Chief Minister and Minister for Social Affairs.

Leymang cabinet
Position	Minister
Chief Minister	Gérard Leymang
Deputy Chief Minister; Minister for Social Affairs	Walter Lini
Minister for Education	Donald Kalpokas
Minister for Finance	Guy Prévot
Minister for Health	John Naupa
Minister for Internal Affairs	Maxime Carlot Korman
Minister for Public Services	George Kalkoa
Minister for Trade, Industry and Tourism	Aimé Maleré
Minister for Transport and Communications	Luke Dini
Minister for Natural Resources	Thomas Reuben
