= Republic of Minerva =

1972 micronation in the Pacific Ocean

Coordinates: 23°38′30″S 178°54′47″W

- Unrecognized micronation
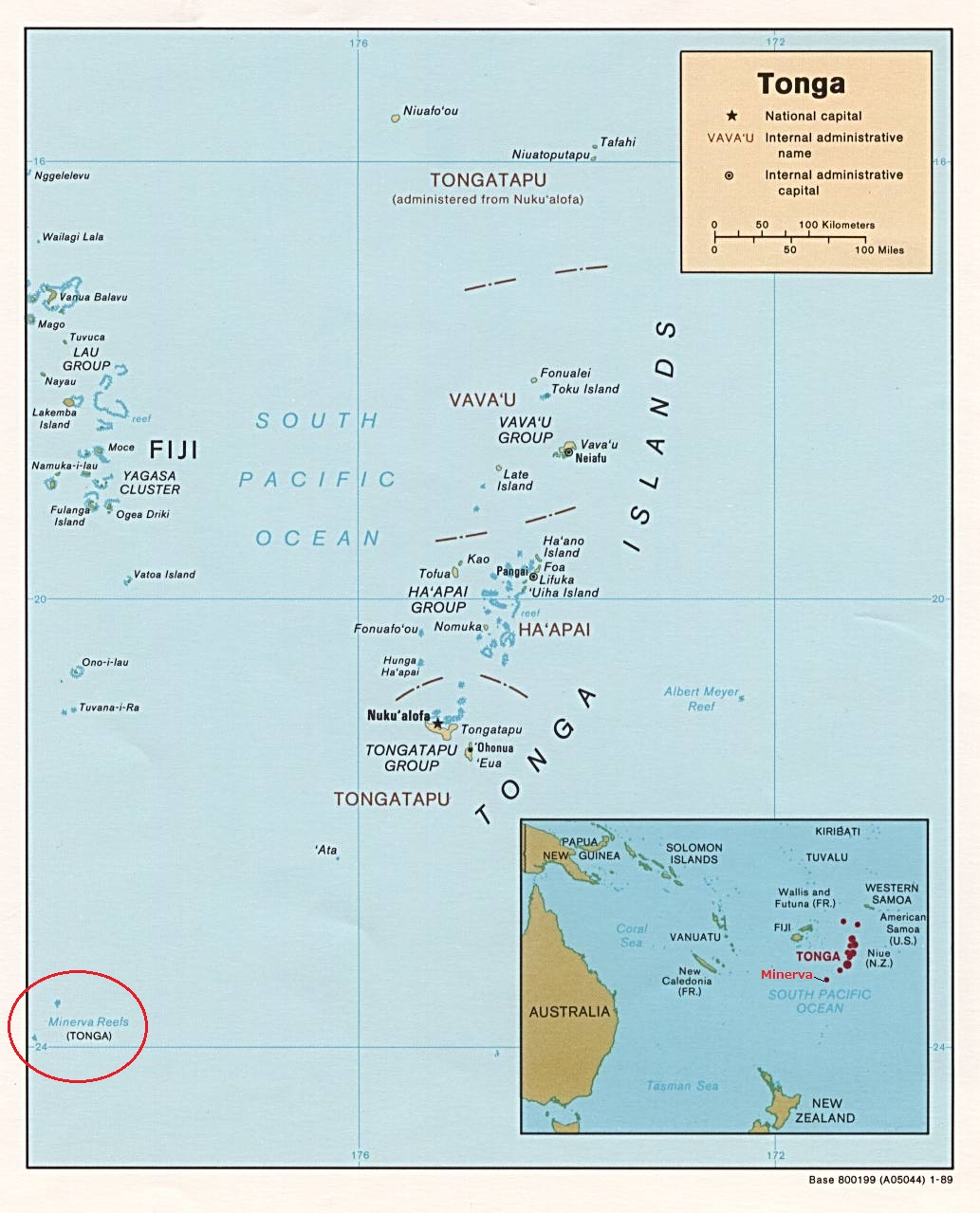
- Location of Minerva Reefs
- Claimed by: Michael Oliver
- Dates claimed: 1972–1973, 1982
- Area claimed: Minerva Reefs (Tonga)

The Republic of Minerva was a micronation consisting of the Minerva Reefs. It was one of the few modern attempts at creating a sovereign micronation on the reclaimed land of an artificial island in 1972. The architect was Las Vegas real estate millionaire and political activist Michael Oliver, who went on to other similar attempts in the following decade. Lithuanian-born Oliver formed a syndicate, the Ocean Life Research Foundation, which had considerable finances for the project and had offices in New York and London. They anticipated a libertarian society with "no taxation, welfare, subsidies, or any form of economic interventionism." In addition to tourism and fishing, the economy of the new nation would include light industry and other commerce.

On 24 February 1972 Tonga made a claim over the Minerva Reefs, which was backed by Australia, New Zealand (including the Cook Islands), Fiji, Nauru and Samoa. A Tongan expedition was sent to enforce the claim, arriving on 18 June 1972. In 1982 a group of Americans led by Morris C. "Bud" Davis tried to occupy the reefs, but were forced off by Tongan troops after three weeks. No known claimant group since 1982 has made any attempt to take possession of the Minerva Reefs. According to Reason, Minerva has today been "more or less reclaimed by the sea".

== History ==
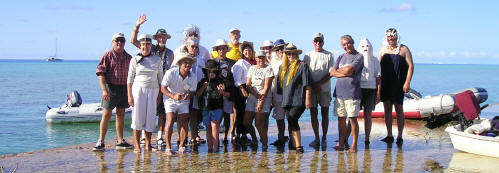
Landing on Minerva, years after the confrontation.

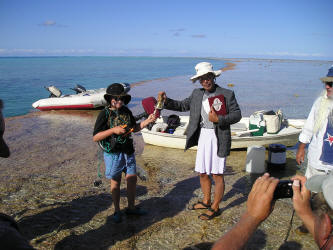
More people walking on Minerva.

The reefs were put on the charts by Captain John Nicholson of LMS Haweis in December 1818 as reported in The Sydney Gazette 30 January 1819 and had been marked on charts as "Nicholson's Shoal" since the late 1820s. Captain H. M. Denham of HMS Herald surveyed the reefs in 1854 and renamed them after the Australian whaler Minerva, which collided with South Minerva Reef on 9 September 1829.

Flag of Minerva

In 1971 barges loaded with sand arrived from Australia, bringing the reef level above the water and allowing construction of a small tower and flag. The Republic of Minerva issued a declaration of independence on 19 January 1972, in letters to neighboring countries and even created their own currency. Morris C. "Bud" Davis was elected as President of the Republic of Minerva.

Prior to 1972, Tonga had not claimed sovereignty over the Minerva Reefs. In 1887, when King George Tupou I of Tonga first proclaimed Tonga’s territory, the Minerva Reefs were not included. When asked about the Minervan's project, the King of Tonga, Taufaʻahau Tupou IV, denied rumors that Tonga meant to claim sovereignty over it, yet said "it was in the best interest of Tonga not to allow a group of people, whose objects were to make money and whose activities could be harmful, to become established on the reefs." Neighboring countries agreed; Fiji’s Prime Minister, Ratu Sir Kamisese Mara, claimed the actions of the Minervans set a dangerous precedent: "If these people can claim Minerva, what would stop them from doing it here?"

Consequently, a conference of the neighboring states (Australia, New Zealand, Tonga, Fiji, Nauru, Samoa, and territory of Cook Islands) met on 24 February 1972 at which Tonga made a claim over the Minerva Reefs, and the rest of the states recognized its claim.

On 15 June 1972 the following proclamation was published in a Tongan government gazette:

PROCLAMATION

His Majesty King Taufaʻahau Tupou IV in Council DOES HEREBY PROCLAIM:
WHEREAS the Reefs known as North Minerva Reef and South Minerva Reef have long served as fishing grounds for the Tongan people and have long been regarded as belonging to the Kingdom of Tonga has now created on these Reefs islands known as Teleki Tokelau and Teleki Tonga; AND WHEREAS it is expedient that we should now confirm the rights of the Kingdom of Tonga to these islands; THEREFORE we do hereby AFFIRM and PROCLAIM that the islands, rocks, reefs, foreshores and waters lying within a radius of twelve miles [19.31 km] thereof are part of our Kingdom of Tonga.

A Tongan expedition was sent to enforce the claim, arriving on 18 June 1972. The Flag of Tonga was raised on 19 June 1972 on North Minerva and on South Minerva on 21 June 1972. Tonga's claim was recognized by the South Pacific Forum in September 1972. Meanwhile, Provisional President Davis was fired by founder Michael Oliver and the project collapsed in confusion. Nevertheless, Minerva was referred to in O. T. Nelson's post-apocalyptic children's novel The Girl Who Owned a City, published in 1975, as an example of an invented utopia that the book's protagonists could try to emulate.

In 1982 a group of Americans led again by Davis tried to occupy the reefs, but were forced off by Tongan troops after three weeks.

In November 2005, Fiji lodged a complaint with the International Seabed Authority concerning Tonga's maritime waters claims surrounding Minerva. Tonga has lodged a counter claim.

== Coins ==
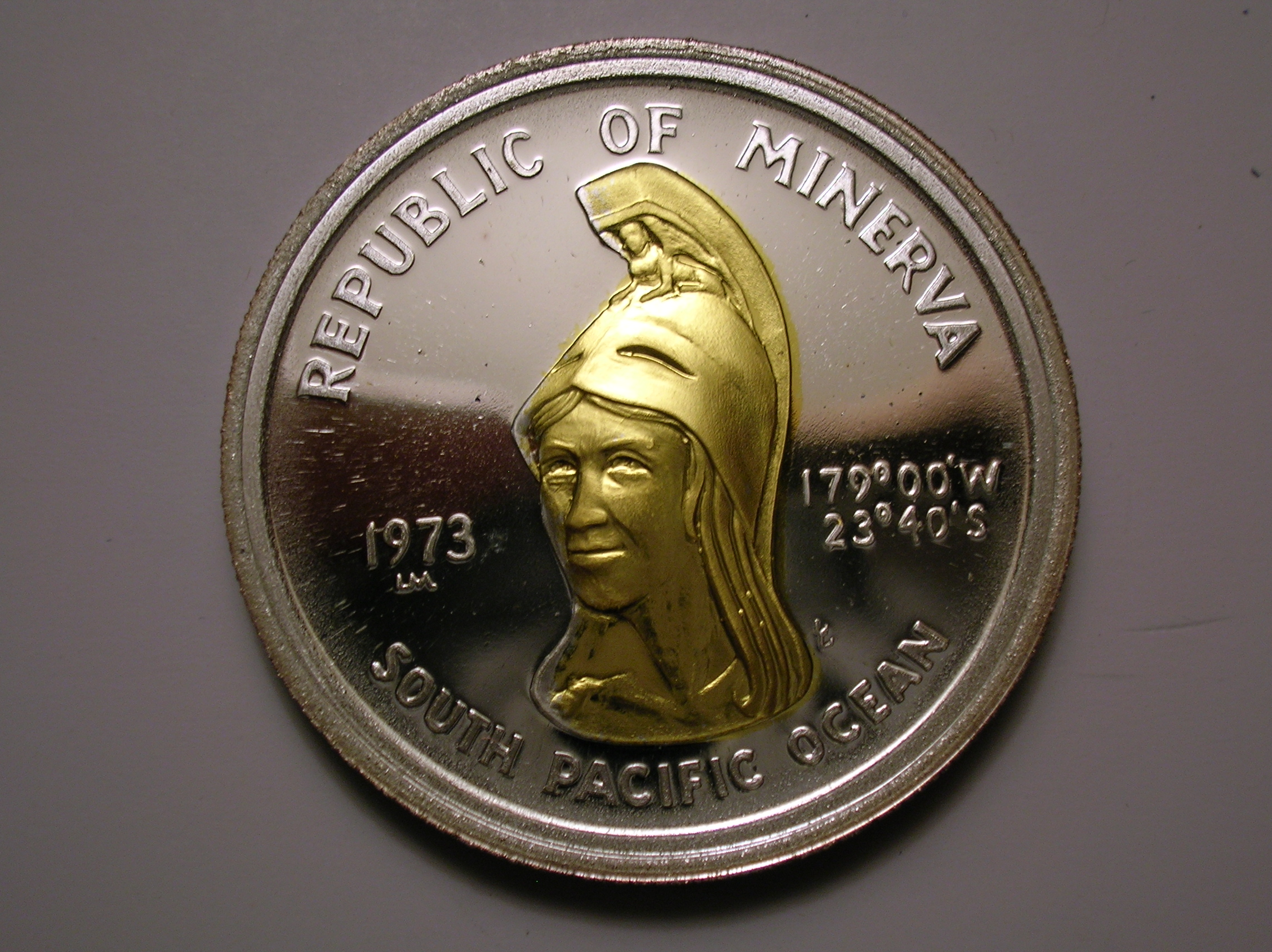
The obverse of the 35 Minerva Dollar coin

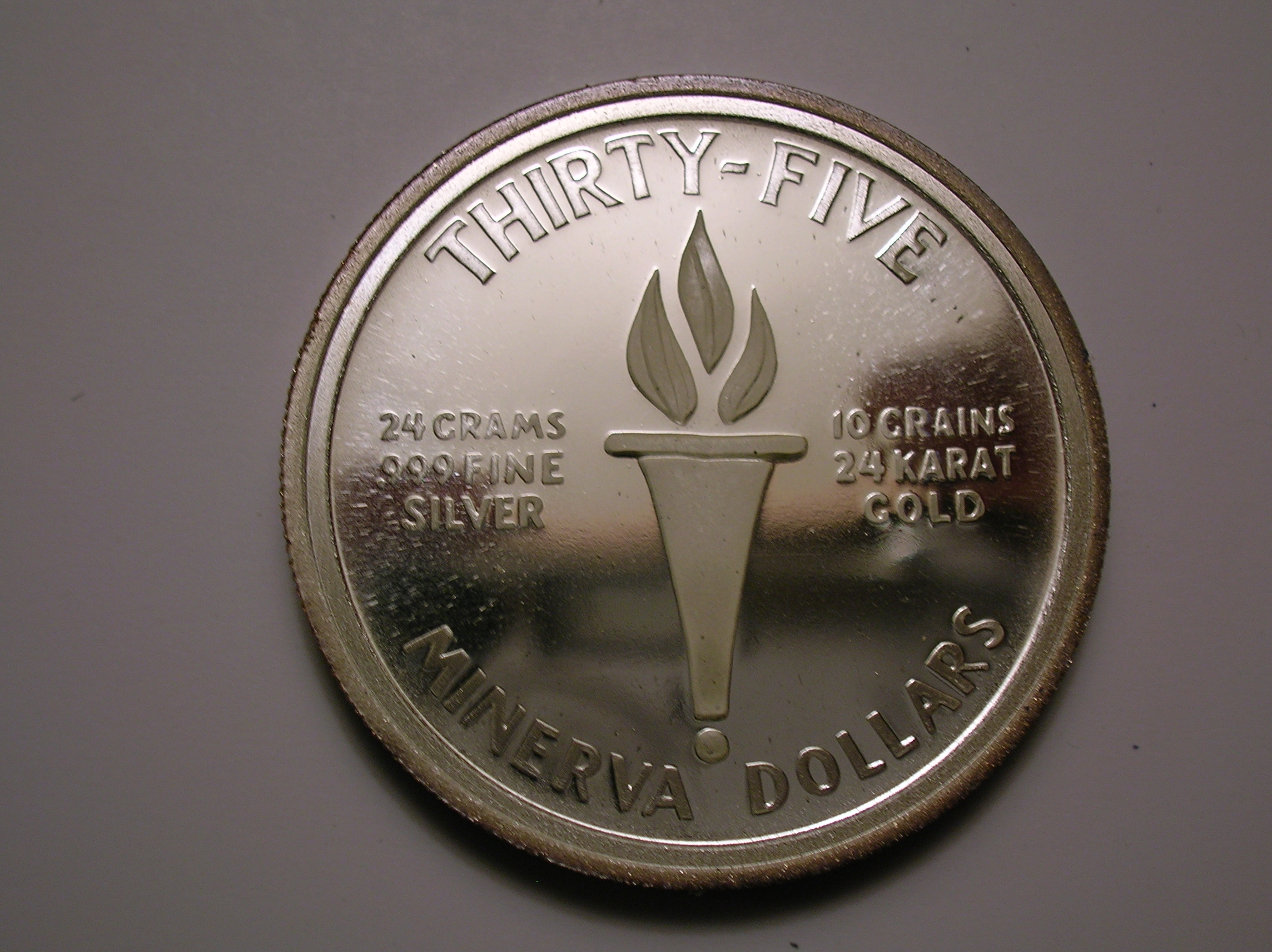
The reverse of the 1973 35 Minerva Dollar coin

== See also ==
- Liberland – a micronation formed on previously unclaimed territory between Croatia and Serbia on the Danube River
- Ocean colonization
- Sealand – a declared principality off the coast of the United Kingdom is built on a WWII sea fort
- REM Island – a platform towed into international waters for the purposes of offshore radio broadcasting
- Republic of Rose Island – a micronation on a platform built off the coast of Italy in the Adriatic Sea
- Saya de Malha Bank
- Seasteading
- How to Start Your Own Country
