= Phoenix Foundation =

Political organization

- Predecessor: Ocean Life Research
- Formation: June 1975
- Founder: Michael Oliver; James Murt McKeever; Harry D. Schultz
- Headquarters: Amsterdam

The Phoenix Foundation is a libertarian foundation that has supported numerous attempts to create independent libertarian states through freebooting. The foundation was created by US-based real estate millionaire Michael Oliver (1928-2024), his friend James Murt McKeever, and investment advisor Harry D. Schultz.

Flag of the Republic of Minerva

In 1972 the Foundation began to construct a platform in the South Pacific. Part of a reef, normally a metre below sea level at high tide, was piled high with sand and a small stone platform was erected carrying the flag of the Republic of Minerva—a golden torch on a blue background. The 'President of Minerva', Morris Davis, declared at the time: "People will be free to do as they damn well please. Nothing will be illegal so long it does not infringe on the rights of others. If a citizen wishes to open a tavern, set up gambling or make pornographic films, the government will not interfere." Tonga's claim to the reef was recognized by the South Pacific Forum in September 1972. A Tongan expedition was sent to enforce the claim, arriving on 18 June 1972. The Flag of Tonga was raised on 19 June 1972 on North Minerva and on South Minerva on 21 June 1972.

The Foundation's next attempt to establish a libertarian state was in 1973 on the island of Abaco in the Bahamas. In the period approaching Bahamian independence, a number of white residents objected to living under black rule. In June 1973, one month before the intended independence, the Foundation financed Chuck Hall and Bert Williams' Abaco Independence Movement (AIM), which sought to make Abaco independent of the Bahamas. With the financial support of the Phoenix Foundation the AIM published a newsletter, The Abaco Independent.

Flag of the Republic of Vemerana

In 1980, Michael Oliver allied with Jimmy Stevens of the New Hebrides Autonomy Movement in Vanuatu, which had been unsuccessful in recent elections. NHAM (or MANH) declared an independent Republic of Vemerana in the island of Espiritu Santo. The government of Vanuatu appealed for aid from Papua New Guinea, which sent a battalion of soldiers to stop the rebellion.

During the attempt in Vanuatu, NPR described the Phoenix Foundation as "a sinister right-wing organization". Instituto del Tercer Mundo (Third World Institute), alleged "Jimmy Stevens received $250,000, arms and a radio from the Phoenix Foundation, an ultra-right US organization, in return for concessions to install a casino and, allegedly, cover for illicit activities from Stevens' Republic of Vemarana."
