= Maria Crowby =

Ni-Vanuatu politician (died 2020)

Maria Crowby (died 28 April 2020) was a politician from Vanuatu. She was a Member of the Parliament of Vanuatu for the Union of Moderate Parties. She was elected in 1987 for the electorate of Port Vila, in the same election as Motarilavoa Hilda Lin̄i; the two women were the first women members of parliament elected in Vanuatu. Crowby lost the seat in 1988.

In 2001 and 2002 Crowby and Lin̄i co-led training workshops for potential women parliamentary candidates in order to encourage more women to stand for election. Vanuatu elected its third woman Member of Parliament, Isabelle Donald, in May 2002.

Crowby died on 28 April 2020 in New Caledonia. A large state funeral in Vanuatu's capital, Port Vila, would have been held in her honour but was not possible due to the COVID-19 pandemic.

== See also ==
- List of the first women holders of political offices in Oceania
