= Motarilavoa Hilda Lin̄i =

Ni-Vanuatu politician and activist (1953–2025)

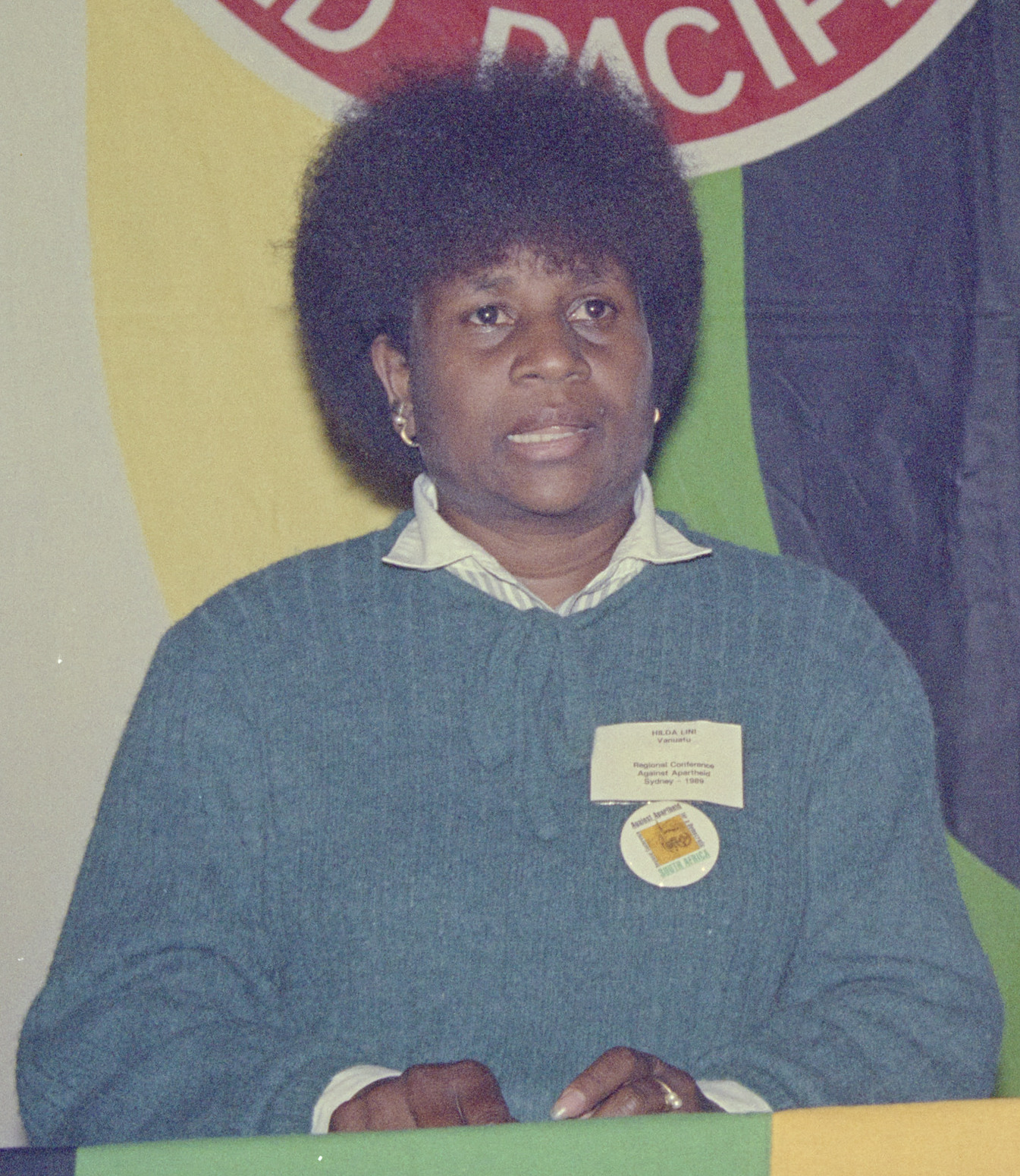
- Liñi in 1989

Minister of Justice, Culture and Women's Affairs
- In office October 1996 – November 1996
- Preceded by: Joe Natuman
- Succeeded by: Walter Lini

Minister of Rural Water Supply and Health
- In office 1991–1995

Member of Parliament from the Constituency of Port Vila
- In office 1987–1996

Personal details
- Born: 7 September 1953 Pentecost Island, New Hebrides (now Vanuatu)
- Died: 25 May 2025 (aged 71) Port Vila, Vanuatu
- Relations: Walter Lini (brother)
- Education: University of Papua New Guinea
- Awards: Nuclear-Free Future Award (2005)

Motarilavoa Hilda Lin̄i (7 September 1953 – 25 May 2025) was a Ni-Vanuatu politician, a tribal chief of the Turaga nation of Pentecost Island in Vanuatu in the South Pacific, who was associated with the nuclear-free Pacific movement, women's rights, indigenous rights and environmental issues.

== Life and career ==
Lin̄i was born on 7 September 1953. An alumna of the University of Papua New Guinea, following Vanuatu's independence in 1980, she became one of the first two women elected to the Parliament of Vanuatu, in 1987.

She served as member of parliament until 1996. During the early 1990s, as Minister of Health, she helped to persuade the World Health Organization to bring the question of the legality of nuclear weapons to the International Court of Justice in The Hague. She was briefly Minister of Justice, from October 1996 to November 1996. She received The Nuclear-Free Future Award in 2005. She was a sister of Vanuatu's first Prime Minister, Walter Lin̄i.

Lin̄i died at Port Vila Central Hospital in Port Vila, on 25 May 2025, at the age of 72.

== See also ==
- List of the first women holders of political offices in Oceania
