= 1979 New Hebridean general election =

General elections were held in the New Hebrides on 14 November 1979 for the seats in Representative Assembly, the last before independence the following year. The result was a victory for the Vanua'aku Pati, which won 25 of the 39 seats, with its partner party Natui Tanno winning one. Voter turnout was 90.3%.

== Background ==
Prior to the elections, the New Hebrides Federal Party was formed by former members of Tanunion and Natatok, as well as members of Nagriamel.

== Electoral system ==
The 39 members of the legislature were elected from 15 constituencies.

== Results ==
Party	Votes	%	Seats
Vanua'aku Pati	28,636	60.77	25
New Hebrides Federal Party	5,742	12.19	5
Moderate Party	2,731	5.80	2
Namangi Aute	1,985	4.21	2
John Frum Movement	1,050	2.23	1
Kapiel	985	2.09	1
Natui Tanno	719	1.53	1
Kastom	683	1.45	0
Natatok	640	1.36	0
Tabwemasana	155	0.33	0
Independents	3,796	8.06	2
Total	47,122	100.00	39
Valid votes	47,122	99.12	
Invalid/blank votes	418	0.88	
Total votes	47,540	100.00	
Registered voters/turnout	52,636	90.32	
Source: Zorgbibe

== Aftermath ==
After it was announced that the Vanua'aku Pati had also won a majority on the regional assembly election of Espiritu Santo were announced, supporters of Nagriamel and Tabwemasana took to the streets with weapons to tell immigrants to leave the island. Almost 360 people took sanctuary in the Anglican church compound and around 350–500 people fled the island.

On 29 November the Representative Assembly elected Walter Lini as Chief Minister. Lini received 26 votes, defeating Gérard Leymang who received three; three members abstained and seven MHAs from Espiritu Santo boycotted the session, claiming there had been electoral fraud.

Position	Member
Chief Minister; Minister of Justice	Walter Lini
Deputy Chief Minister; Minister of the Interior	George Kalkoa
Minister of Education	Donald Kalpokas
Minister of Finance	Kalpokor Kalsakau
Minister of Health	George Worek
Minister of Lands	Sethy Regenvanu
Minister of Natural Resources	Thomas Reuben
Minister of Social Affairs	Willie Korisa
Minister of Transport, Communications and Civil Aviation	John Naupa

== See also ==
- List of members of the Parliament of Vanuatu (1979–1983)
