= Jimmy Stevens (politician) =

Vanuatuan politician (died 1994)

Proposed flag of the Republic of Vemerana (1980)

Jimmy Stevens (1916 or 1920s – 28 February 1994), known as "Moses", was a Ni-Vanuatu nationalist and politician.

As leader of the conservative Nagriamel movement, he declared the independence of Espiritu Santo island as the "State of Vemerana" in June 1980 and referred to himself as "prime minister". After the Republic of Vanuatu was granted independence in July, Prime Minister Walter Lini deployed Papua New Guinean troops and the revolt was crushed in August.

At Stevens' trial, it was revealed that Stevens and Nagriamel received US$250,000 from the American-based Phoenix Foundation, a libertarian group that previously attempted to establish an independent tax-haven state in Abaco Island, the Bahamas in 1973. Stevens was convicted and sentenced to 14 years' imprisonment. On 12 September 1982, Stevens escaped from prison but was recaptured just two days after his escape. Stevens was released from prison on 14 August 1991.

Stevens was of part-European, part-Melanesian, and part-Polynesian descent. He claimed that his father was Scottish and that his mother was Tongan. He reportedly had 23 wives and fathered four dozen children. He died in Espiritu Santo of stomach cancer.
