= Namakura language =

Austronesian language spoken in Vanuatu

Namakura
- Namakir
- Native to: Vanuatu
- Region: Shepherds Islands (Tongoa & Tongariki), north of Efate
- Native speakers: (3,800 cited 2001)
- Language family: Austronesian: Malayo-Polynesian; Oceanic; Southern Oceanic; North-Central Vanuatu; Central Vanuatu; Epi-Efate; Efate; Namakura

Language codes
- ISO 639-3: nmk
- Glottolog: nama1268
- Namakura is not endangered according to the classification system of the UNESCO Atlas of the World's Languages in Danger

A Namakura speaker, recorded in Vanuatu.

The Namakura language, Makura or Namakir, is an Oceanic language of Vanuatu. The language is spoken in Shefa Province, north Efate, Tongoa, and Tongariki. It is the only North-Central Vanuatu language to have preserved the Proto-Oceanic *q, reflected as a glottal stop.

== Phonology ==
=== Consonants ===
		Labial		Coronal	Velar	Glottal
		plain	lab.	Coronal	Velar	Glottal
Nasal		m	mʷ	n	ŋ	
Plosive	voiceless	p	pʷ	t	k	ʔ
Plosive	prenasal	ᵐb	ᵐbʷ	ⁿd	ᵑɡ	
Fricative	voiceless	f		s		h
Fricative	voiced	v				
Approximant		w		l		
Rhotic				r		

- /v/ may also range to bilabial as [β], in free variation.
- /h/ can also range to uvular as [χ], in free variation.
- /ⁿd/ can also range to a retroflex [ᶯɖ] in free variation. When followed by a /r/, it is then realized as a trilled-articulated sound [ⁿdʳ, ᶯɖʳ].
- /r/ can be heard as a flap [ɾ] in initial position and as a trill [r] elsewhere.

=== Vowels ===
	Front	Central	Back
Close	i iː		u uː
Mid	e eː		o oː
Open		a aː	

- Two nasal vowel sounds [ẽ õ] are also rarely heard.
- /i/ when preceding a vowel can be heard as a glide [j].
