= Onneyn Tahi =

Vanuatuan politician

Acting President of Vanuatu
- In office 12 January 1989 – 30 January 1989
- Prime Minister: Walter Lini
- Preceded by: Ati George Sokomanu
- Succeeded by: Frederick Karlomuana Timakata

Speaker of the Parliament
- In office December 1987 – June 1991
- Preceded by: Frederick Karlomuana Timakata
- Succeeded by: Tele Taun

Personal details
- Born: July 24, 1944 Aoba Island
- Died: 1998 Aoba Island
- Party: Vanua'aku Pati
- Other political affiliations: People's Democratic Party

Onneyn Morris Tahi (24 July 1944 – 1998) was a Vanuatuan politician.

== Biography ==
Tahi was born on 24 July 1944 in the small town of Losingoiburie on Aoba Island. Shortly thereafter, he moved to his father's village Lovuietu, where his father owned a shop, bakery, and copra processing shed. He attended the Tavolala Village School, the Holy Trinity School, and the Aobabalu School.

After some years in civil service, Tahi entered politics in 1979 when he ran for and won a seat on the Aoba Islands Subcommittee. He represented Ambae constituency in Parliament from 1980 to 1995. In 1993, he was given the ministerial portfolio of education and sports. Tahi was the speaker of the Parliament from 1987 to 1991. He briefly served as acting president of Vanuatu in January 1991 after Ati George Sokomanu was removed from Office by the Electoral College due to gross misconduct. Tahi was named Minister of Agriculture in 1991. He began to see some opposition due to a perceived failure to initiate projects in his constituency. He was Minister of Finance in 1992.

In 1994, he was one of the founding members of the People's Democratic Party. He returned to the Vanua'aku Pati in 1997. In the lead up to the 1998 parliamentary elections, Tahi was killed in a car crash.
