= New Hebrides Representative Assembly =

Type
- Type: Unicameral

History
- Founded: 1975
- Disbanded: 1980

Meeting place
- Vila

The New Hebrides Representative Assembly was the unicameral legislature of the New Hebrides Condominium (present-day Vanuatu) from 1975 to 1980. It was the first elected legislative arm in the condominium.

The Representative Assembly replaced the unelected advisory council. It had initially 42 members, and the 1975 elections with universal suffrage allowed Melanesians to participate for the first time. In addition to the members elected by universal suffrage also other interest groups elected members. The first meeting of the assembly took place in July 1976. The British and the French resident commissioners had override veto power over assembly decisions.

New Hebrides became internally self-governing in January 1978 under an administration formed by George Kalsakau. The pro-independence Vanua'aku Pati (VP) had boycotted the November 1977 election and formed a competing Vanuaaku People's Provisional Government, which controlled most of the islands. The provisional government was suspended in May 1978 and a new government of national unity was formed in December 1978, drawing both from Assembly members and from the extraparliamentary Vanua'aku Pati.

The Parliament of Vanuatu took over all functions of the Representative Assembly upon Vanuatu's independence in July 1980.

== Chairmen of the Assembly ==
Name	Took office	Left office	Notes
Gérard Leymang	July 1976	November 1977	
Maxime Carlot Korman	November 1977	December 1978	
George Kalsakau	December 1978	1979	
Fred Timakata	November 1979	1980	Resigned
Maxime Carlot Korman	1980	July 1980	Became Speaker of the Parliament of Vanuatu

== Elections ==
- 1975 New Hebridean general election
- 1977 New Hebridean general election
- 1979 New Hebridean general election

== See also ==
- New Hebrides Condominium
- Parliament of Vanuatu
- List of legislatures by country
