= Central Vanuatu languages =

Subgroup of the Oceanic branch of the Austronesian language family

Central Vanuatu
- Geographic distribution: Vanuatu
- Linguistic classification: Austronesian: Malayo-Polynesian; Oceanic; Southern Oceanic; Central Vanuatu

Language codes
- Glottolog: cent2269

The Central Vanuatu languages form a linkage of Southern Oceanic languages spoken in central Vanuatu.

== Languages ==
=== Clark (2009) ===
Clark (2009) provides the following classification of the Central Vanuatu languages, divided into geographic areas. Outlier (aberrant) languages identified by Clark (2009) are in italics. Clark's Central Vanuatu branch is wider in scope, including not only the Shepherd–Efate languages, but also the Malakula and Ambrym–Paama–Epi languages.

- Central Vanuatu
  - Malakula languages
    - Northeast Malakula (Uripiv), Vao, Vovo; Mpotovoro
    - Dirak, Malua Bay
    - V’ënen Taut, Tape
    - Larevat, Neve’ei, Naman
    - Navava, Nevwervwer
    - Unua-Pangkumu
    - Banam Bay, Aulua
    - Lendamboi; Nasarian
    - Axamb, Avok, Maskelynes, Port Sandwich
    - Sinesip, Naha’ai; Ninde
  - Ambrym–Paama–Epi area
    - Ambrym Island: North Ambrym, West Ambrym, South Ambrym
    - Paama Island: Southeast Ambrym, Paamese
    - Epi Island: Lewo, Lamen, Bierebo, Baki
    - Epi Island: Mkir, Bieria
  - Shepherd–Efate area
    - Shepherd Islands: Nakanamanga (Nguna); Namakir
    - Efate Island: South Efate

=== François et al. (2015) ===
The following list of 19 Central Vanuatu languages (excluding the Malakula languages) is from François et al. (2015:18–21).

No.	Language	Other names	Speakers	ISO 639-3	Region
107	North Ambrym		5250	mmg	Ambrym
108	Orkon	Fanbak	30	fnb	Ambrym
109	Southeast Ambrym		3700	tvk	Ambrym
110	Daakie	Port Vato	1300	ptv	Ambrym
111	Daakaka	South Ambrym, Baiap	1200	bpa	Ambrym
112	Dalkalaen		1000		Ambrym
113	Raljago	West Ambrym, Lonwolwol	<10	crc	Ambrym
114	Paama	Paamese	6000	paa	Paama
115	Lamen	Lamenu, Varmali	850	lmu	Epi, Lamen
116	Lewo	Varsu	2200	lww	Epi
117	Bierebo	Bonkovia-Yevali	900	bnk	Epi
118	Baki	Burumba, Paki	350	bki	Epi
119	Mkir	Maii	180	mmm	Epi
120	Bieria	Bieri, Vovo, Wowo	25	brj	Epi
121	Namakura	Makura, Namakir	3750	nmk	Efate, Shepherd Islands (Tongoa, Tongariki)
123	Nakanamanga		9500	llp	Efate, Shepherd Islands (Nguna, Tongoa)
124	Lelepa	Havannah Harbour	400	lpa	Efate, Lelepa
125	Eton		500	etn	Efate
126	South Efate	Erakor	6000	erk	Efate

Additionally, the extinct Sowa language was formerly spoken in central Vanuatu.
