= Dalkalaen language =

Austronesian language spoken in Vanuatu

Dalkalaen
- Native to: Vanuatu
- Region: Ambrym Island
- Native speakers: 1,000 (2015)
- Language family: Austronesian: Malayo-Polynesian; Oceanic; Southern Oceanic; North-Central Vanuatu; Central Vanuatu; Dalkalaen

Language codes
- ISO 639-3: –
- Glottolog: dalk1234

Dalkalaen is a Central Vanuatu language spoken by about 1,000 people on the southwestern tip of Ambrym Island, Vanuatu.

Dalkalaen is closely related to the Daakaka language.
