= Nafsan language =

Austronesian language spoken in Vanuatu

Nafsan
- South Efate
- Fate, Erakor
- Native to: Northeast Vanuatu
- Region: Efate Island
- Native speakers: (6,000 cited 2001)
- Language family: Austronesian: Malayo-Polynesian; Oceanic; Southern Oceanic; North-Central Vanuatu; Central Vanuatu; Epi-Efate; Efate; Nafsan

Language codes
- ISO 639-3: erk
- Glottolog: sout2856
- Nafsan is not endangered according to the classification system of the UNESCO Atlas of the World's Languages in Danger

The Nafsan language, also known as South Efate or Erakor, is a Southern Oceanic language spoken on the island of Efate in central Vanuatu. As of 2005, there are approximately 6,000 speakers who live in coastal villages from Pango to Eton. The language's grammar has been studied by Nicholas Thieberger, who has also produced a book of stories and a dictionary of the language.

Nafsan is closely related to Nguna and to Lelepa. Based on shared features with southern Vanuatu languages (including echo–subject marking, and the free and preposed 1st-singular-possessive morphemes), Lynch (2001) suggests it could form part of a southern Vanuatu subgroup that includes New Caledonia instead of the neighboring Efate languages.

== Phonology ==
Nafsan has a total of 20 phonemes consisting of 15 consonant and 5 vowel sounds. (Note: Thieberger (2006: 45).)

Consonants (Note: Thieberger (2006: 46).)
	Labial	Alveolar	Dorsal	Labiovelar
Nasal	m ⟨m⟩	n ⟨n⟩	ŋ ⟨g⟩	ŋ͡m ⟨m̃⟩
Stop	p ⟨p⟩	t ⟨t⟩	k ⟨k⟩	k͡p ⟨p̃⟩
Fricative	f ⟨f⟩	s ⟨s⟩		
Approximant		l ⟨l⟩	j ⟨y⟩	w ⟨w⟩
Trill		r ⟨r⟩		
Trill		nᵈr ⟨nr⟩		

Vowels
	Front	Back
High	i ⟨i⟩	u ⟨u⟩
Mid	e ⟨e⟩	o ⟨o⟩
Low	a ⟨a⟩	

As seen in the above chart, Nafsan's vowel phoneme inventory is that of a five-vowel system; this is one of the most commonly seen vowel inventories in any given language in the world and also especially evident in many Oceanic languages. There is a distinction between short and long vowels but it is currently in a process of change that makes its status unclear. (Note: Thieberger (2006: 54).)

=== Degemination ===
In Nafsan, it is typical that two contiguous identical consonants occurring in an utterance undergo a process of degemination to be realised as a single consonant. In (1), the two contiguous identical consonants /n/ result in the phonetic attachment of demonstrative ne 'this' to the preceding word nawen ne [nawene] 'this sand'. (Note: Thieberger (2006: 74))

I=tao nawen ne
3SG.RS=left sand this
She left this sand bank.

=== Vowel centralisation ===
High vowels in prepositions acting as a prefix often undergo a process of vowel centralisation to reduce the unstressed syllable. In (2), the high vowel /i/ in the preposition ki is reduced to [ə] when preceding the demonstrative nen 'that'. (Note: Thieberger (2006: 78))

ki- nen > kenen, kne
PREP- AD > PREP.AD {}
to, of that

== Numerals ==
The system of numerals in Nafsan is base-5 (quinary). Numbers for two to five are distinct numerals that are then seen repeated in slight variation for the numbers seven to ten. The pattern of the numerals can be seen in the table below. (Note: Thieberger (2006: 77).)

Cardinal	English
i-skei	one
i-nru; nran; nru	two
i-tol	three
i-pat	four
i-lim	five
i-lates	six
i-laru	seven
i-latol	eight
i-lfot	nine
ralim iskei	ten

Ralim iskei can be used as an example to see the method for displaying number ten and above in South Efate; the numeral for ten ralim is followed by its multiplier, which in this case is iskei for one. The term for and atmat is added after the multiplier with an additional numeral to form a number such as thirty seven:

ralim itol atmat ilaru
ten three and seven
thirty-seven

== Morphosyntax ==
=== Adnominal possession ===
There are two ways of marking adnominal possession in Nafsan: through the use of a possessive pronoun (indirect possession), or directly on the noun (direct possession). Indirect possession is used for general possession, while direct possession is used for nouns that are closely associated items (e.g., body parts or products, kinship terms, etc.). (Note: Thieberger (2006: 127).)

==== Indirect/general possession ====
Indirect possession is morphosyntactically represented through the use of the possessive markers ni (of) or knen (of it), or of the presence of a possessive pronoun such as nakte (my/mine).

When possession is marked by a possessive pronoun, the pronouns follow the possessed NP:

Nasum̃tap p̃ur nigmam nen i=tarp̃ek.
church big 1PL.EX.POS REL 3SG.RS=fall.down
It was our church that fell down. (Note: Thieberger (2006: 128).)

ni possession: the preposition ni only occurs when the possessum is a noun. The NP follows the form of ‘possessed ni possessor’.

I=pi nawesien ni Atua.
3SG.RS=be work of God
It is God's work.

knen possession: This form is used as an inanimate referent, and often indicates a previously mentioned participant in the discourse. It is positioned following the referent noun.

Natrauswen kaaru i=pitlak nalag knen.
story next 3SG.RS=have song of.it
The next story, it has its song. (Note: Thieberger (2006: 129).)

==== Direct possession ====
Direct possession is used for inalienably possessed nouns. This is similar to other languages of Vanuatu that denote inalienable nouns as those that refer to relationships of part-whole association such as kinship terms, body parts or products, and associated parts (such as leaf/stem). These nouns take directly suffixed possession markers, however they can also occur without possessive marking when the possessor is encoded by a noun. The directly possessed (DP) suffix only attaches to the class of directly possessed nouns. For sg and 3p forms, an unpredictable vowel (V) may be inserted to aid DP suffixation. (Note: Thieberger (2006: 124))

Go ra=paos-ki-n ki, "Gaag tm-a-m go rait-o-m wa?"
and 3d.RS=ask-TR-3sg.O PREP 2sg.POS father-V-2sg.DP and mother-V-3sg.DP where
And they asked, "Where are your father and mother?" (Note: Thieberger (2006: 130).)

If the directly possessed noun has no possessive suffix, the referent is presumed unknown or disembodied. Lack of possession also occurs when possession is encoded by the possessed noun preceding the possessor. As in the following example, the directly possessed noun rait (mother) is preceded by the noun tesa (child).

Go rait tesa ke=fo tae tuleg preg tete namrun ses.
and mother child 3sg.IRR=PSP:IR able stand.up make some thing small
And the child's mother can stand up and do some small things. (Note: Thieberger (2006: 131).)

=== Negation ===
Negation in Nafsan occurs in two ways. The first is the use of the intransitive verb tik (no, nothing), which can be used singularly or paired with the generic proclitic i= (3sgRS). The second, more widely used method, is through the use of discontinuous negative particles ta ... mau. Nafsan also does not differentiate between the negation of predicates and the negation of whole propositions.

==== Tik ====
Tik is a verb translated as 'no' or 'nothing' and is used in similar contexts to its English translations. In the following example, tik is used in the same way as in the English translation.

Go Ririal i=mer. nrik Ririel ki na, "Tik, ag p̃a=fag."
and Ririal 3sg.RS=in.turn tell Ririal PREP say no 2sg 2sg.IRR=climb:IR
And Ririal, in turn, said to Ririel, "No, you climb."

Tik is also able to be made into a transitive verb through the addition of the transitive suffix -ki. When this occurs, the new gloss is 'to not have'. As such, in the following example there is no instance of a possessive verb being negated, instead the verb in the sentence (tik-ki) is negative in meaning. Another verb that is negative in meaning is tap, meaning 'to not do something'.

Ru=tik-ki kram
3p.RS=no-TR axe
they had no axe.

==== Negative particles ====
The other way of negating predicates in Nafsan is through the use of two negative particles: ta(p)...mau. There is free variation between the use of ta and tap, ie the usage does not change according to any specific environment. (Note: Thieberger (2004: 250))Ta(p) is used preceding the proposition to be negated, and mau follows at the end of the sentence. The following examples show a positive sentence, which is then negated in the second example.

Ki=mai pi as
3sg.PS=come be {coconut crab}
He became a coconut crab. (Note: Thieberger (2006: 246))

Ki=ta mai pi as mau
3sg.PS=NEG come be {coconut crab} NEG
He didn't become a coconut-crab.

Sometimes, in the casual speech of young people predominantly, the second negative particle mau is left off, as seen in the following example.

Rui=pe ta mur na ruk=nrog a?
3PL.PS=PRF NEG want say 3PL.IRR=hear INT
They don't want to hear, they don't want to believe eh?

The ta marker can also act a durative marker, so in negative sentences where both uses of ta are present it can result in two different readings of a sentence. In the first example below, reading the first ta as the negative one results in the whole proposition being negated. In the second example, exactly the same sentence, reading the second ta as the negative results in only the final verb (puet 'to take') being negated, thus creating a different meaning entirely.

A=ta mro-ki-n na ruk=fo mer ta puet kineu mau.
1SG.RS=NEG think-TS-3SG.O say 3p.IRR=PSP:IR in.turn DUR take 1SG NEG.
I don't think that they would still take me. (Note: Thieberger (2006: 249))

A=ta mro-ki-n na ruk=fo mer ta puet kineu mau.
1SG.RS=DUR think-TS-3SG.O say 3p.IRR=PSP:IR in.turn NEG take 1SG NEG.
I still think that they would not take me.

=== Demonstratives ===
There are three common forms of demonstratives in Nafsan: go 'that, near addressee', ne 'this', and nen 'that'. Similar to other Southern Oceanic languages, these forms serve both spatio-temporal and discourse deictic functions. (Note: Thieberger (2006: 149-153)) The form go 'that' is addressee-anchored referent to a spatial location nearer to the addressee from the speaker's perspective or something previously said by the addressee. This encoding is found in other languages of Vanuatu, such as Ske, that do not belong to the Central Vanuatu subgroup. There is an ability for syntactic ambiguity stemming from the two common functions encoded by demonstratives resulting in dual interpretations possible in some utterances. This is shown in example (16) and (17) where the noun kal 'digging stick' used with the demonstrative go can mean 'the digging stick near you' from the spatial sense of the form or 'the digging stick you talked about' from the discourse sense of the form.

Me kal go i=na i=mailumlum.
but digging.stick AD 3sg.RS=INCH 3sg.RS=soft:REDUP
But this digging stick (near you) is soft.

Me kal go i=na i=mailumlum.
but digging.stick AD 3sg.RS=INCH 3sg.RS=soft:REDUP
But this digging stick (you talked about) is soft.

In Nafsan, demonstratives have a noun-demonstrative word order which is typical of Austronesian languages according to the World Atlas of Language Structures. They typically appear in two locations within a sentence as shown in examples (18) and (19); as a modifier of the noun phrase and following a directional adverb, respectively. Otherwise, demonstratives must undergo nominalisation through the addition of the prefix te- (see 3.4.1) as they cannot occur as the only exponent of a noun phrase. While demonstratives can co-occur with lexical nouns and focal pronouns, they cannot do so with clitic pronouns in Nafsan.

Ale tesa ses ne i=to kai.
okay child small this 3SG.RS=STAT cry
Okay, this small child was crying.

Ag ku=totan sa-go me kineu a=mur-i-n na ka=taf.
2.SG 2SG.RS=sit here-AD but 1SG 1SG.RS=want-TS-3SG.O COMP 1SG.IRR=leave
You sit down here (near addressee) but I want to leave. (Note: Thieberger (2006: 144))

The form nen 'that' frequently occurs in collocation with the subordinator kin to create the English equivalent 'that which' as seen in example (19). As the form nen 'that' has the potential to act as a demonstrative or a relativiser, the pause given between the two forms nen and kin indicates that it is likely the form nen 'that' is acting as a demonstrative that is modifying the noun phrase in this context. (Note: Thieberger (2006: 300))

I=tau-ø pak nanre, nen kin pal-u-k nen imat wik nen pa i=tk-os.
3sg.RS=carry-3sg.O to side that REL brother-V-1sg.DP REL 3sg.RS=dead week that go 3sg.RS=stay-3sg.OBL
He took her to the side, that (place) which my brother who died last week stayed at.

The demonstratives ne 'this', and nen 'that' also often occur in collocation with the noun mal 'time' to create the forms malne 'this time', as seen in example (20) and malnen 'that time'.

Ga me i=po sain mal ne.
3sg adn 3sg.RS=PSP sign time this
He would sign it this time. (Note: Thieberger (2006: 146))

==== Distant Clitic ====
The distinction between demonstrative forms ne 'this', and nen 'that' is a result of the distance-encoding clitic =n. This clitic can occur with several word classes as shown in the table below. Furthermore, like spatio-temporal demonstratives, it also has the deictic function of acting as a referent to previous parts of a discourse as shown in example (21).

Examples of distant clitic on different word classes
Word Class	Form	Gloss	Form + Clitic	Gloss
Demonstrative	ne	this	nen	that
Verb	pa	to go	pan	to go there
Preposition	reki	for	rekin	for that

Go nafiaselwen ni tiawi gakit, tu=tae pitlak-e=n mes.
and friendship of old.people 1p.in 1p.inRS=know have-V=DST today
And the friendship of our old people, we can have that today.

==== Presentative Demonstrative ====
The presentative morpheme is a demonstrative in Nafsan which has no paradigmatic relationship with the demonstrators detailed above. The form kia is often collocated with interrogatives such as, such as fei kia 'who here', and typically places emphasis on the preceding nominal or utterance, as shown in example (22).

This function of drawing attention to its preceding forms has been used alongside fillers iwel, gawan, tkanwan which are all used to mean 'thus', 'that's the way', or 'like that', the latter of which is used at the end of the story as seen in example (23).

I=tae mai nrik naot ki-n na, "Ore kineu kia, a=preg proplem".
3sgRS=can come tell chief PREP-3sgO say yes 1sg PR 1sgRS=make problem
He can come and tell the chief, "Yes, it is me who caused the problem."

Me apu neu kia i=mat pato Erueti naur to. Me kineu a=to Efat. Naur pur. m.m Gawan kia.
and g.father 1sgPOS PR 3sgRS=die be.at p.name island at but 1sg 1sgRS=stay p.name island big " like.that PR
And my grandfather died at Erueti island. But I stay on Efate. The big island. m.m. Like that. Like that.

The emphatic purpose of this demonstrative is similar to those found in other languages of Vanuatu such as the form na- in Ske in example (24).

waq na-n=dae, Makila!
ship ASSOC-CONST=DIST M
'That ship there, (is the) Makila.'

=== Nominalisation ===
==== 'Te-' Nominalisation ====
Nominalisation of demonstratives, verbs, possessives, ordinal numbers, quantifiers, and nouns occurs in Nafsan through the attachment of the determiner prefix te-. The productive process of te-nominalisation allows for the derivation of a large class of demonstrative pronouns. (Note: Thieberger (2006: 142))

'Te + demonstrative' nominalisation
Form	Gloss	Te + Form	Gloss
ne	this	tene	this one
nen	that	tenen	that one (distant)
go	that (near addressee)	tego	that one (near addressee)

Example (25) reflects how addressee deixis is encoded in the demonstratives that have undergone te-nominalisation.

Te-go ru=to, fei kin i=repot?
DET-AD 3p.RS=stay who REL 3sgRS=report
Those (near you) here, who will report?

The prefix ka- is attached to nominals greater than one in Nafsan to form ordinal numbers which can then further gain the prefix te- to form a demonstrative as shown in example (26).

'Te + ordinal number' nominalisation
Form	Gloss	Te + Form	Gloss
pei	first	tepei	the first one
karu	second	tekaru	the second one
katol	third	tekatol	the third one

Tag i=pi te-karu, te-katol i=pi Andre.
p.name 3sgRS=be DET-second DET-third 3sgRS=be p.name
Tag is the second, the third is Andre. (Note: Thieberger (2006: 139))

== Pronoun and person marker ==
There are mainly two classes of pronoun in Nafsan. The free pronoun and the bound pronoun. (Note: Thieberger (2006: 103))

=== Free pronoun ===
The free pronouns incorporate three area, demonstrative pronouns, focal pronouns(function as both subject and object) and the oblique free pronoun (in either possessive or benefactive form).

==== Focal pronoun ====
The focal pronoun (Lynch, 2000), also known as an independent pronoun (Crowley, 1998), functions as both the subject and object in an argument. It allows the pronoun itself to be the NP on their own unlike the bound pronouns which have to be attached to a verb. Focal pronouns express singular and plural but do not distinguish dual number.

1a) subject role

Me kineu a=tap nrogtesa-wes mau.
but 1SG 1SG.RS=NEG fell.bad-3SG.O NEG
But I don't/feel bad about it. (Note: Thieberger (2006: 104))

1b) object role

Ruk=fo wat kineu.
3PL.RS=PSP:IR hit 1SG
They will hit me.

The examples (1a)& (1b) show the 1st person singular pronoun kineu performed as the subject and object correspondingly. And the following is a list of the focal pronouns in Nafsan.

Focal pronouns
		Singular	Plural
1st person	inclusive	kineu/neu	akit
1st person	exclusive	kineu/neu	komam
2nd person		ag	akam
3rd person		ga	gar

==== Oblique free pronoun ====
Oblique free pronoun function in possessive also benefactive case. For the possessive pronoun, it follows the possessed NP, generally made up of the preposition -nig ‘from’/ ‘of’.

2) Possessive pronouns follow the possessed NP

Nasum̃tap p̃ur nigmam nen i=tarp̃ek.
church big 1PL.EX.POS REL 3SG.RS=fall.down
It was our church that fell down.

There are variation forms of the suffix -nig, when it combines with an unstressed syllable, the high vowel will become lower. E.g. (niger → neger)

===== Benefactive =====
In the benefactive, the argument shares the same possessive morphology, yet the possessive morpheme is used in the pre-verbal position to express the beneficiary. The following example shows how beneficiary expressed by a pre-verbal position.

Mlapuas kin i=min nalkis nl sokfal.
{owl sp}. COMP 3SG.RS=drink herbs of {owl sp.}
Mlapuas who drank sokfal 's herbs. (Note: Thieberger (2006: 279))

Ki=ni sokfal ut nai.
3SG.lRR=of {owl sp.} pour water
He poured water for sokfal.

=== Bound Pronoun ===
Bound pronoun comprises subject proclitics, object suffix for direct object and direct possessive. For the subject proclitics, there is neither separate set of dual object, nor oblique form. The obligatory subject proclitic pronouns are being seen as the arguments of the verb. For the pronominal suffixes of bound pronouns, the plural form is used to express any number that is greater than one.

==== Bound subject pronouns ====
The proclitic subject pronoun cannot stand alone without attaching to the first element of the Verb compound. They are considered to be clitics since they can attach to any part of the Verb compound. Subject proclitics happened in three archetypes, realis, irrealis and perfect. The subject proclitic represents the subject argument since it is the only obligatory element in the sentence except for the verb.

===== Realis/irrealis pronominal =====
Proclitic subjects distinguish realis and irrealis situation. The realis is unmarked, and the irrealis being marked in the subject to show the action is yet to be realised, including most of the future events but not all, all the imperatives and hortatives. There is a strong preference for the subject of desideratives, achievement and predicates to be using irrealis form.

4)realis and irrealis paradigm

A=nrik-i-n ki na "He a=muri-n na p̃a=mai ni Kaltog preg nalkis, i=wel ku=f tae preg-i-Ø."
1SG.RS=tell-TS-3SG.O PREP COMP hey 1SG.RS=want-TS-3SG.O COMP 2SG.lRR=come BEN p.name make medicine 3SG.RS=thus 2SG.RS=COND know make-TS-3SG.O
I said to him, "Hey, I want you to bring some medicine for Kaltog, if you can do that." (Note: Thieberger (2006: 110))

The examples (4) show all realis form of pronouns in all cases except the subject of the verb mai ‘to come’ which is appeared in a desiderative complement.

===== Perfect pronominal =====
When dealing with aspectual past (event that is over), regarding the speaking event and past time reference, the perfect form of proclitic is used. Generally, perfect proclitics directly followed by the perfective particle pe, yet it is not a necessary criterion. Notably, perfect proclitics never occur in imperatives. Perfect proclitics can be found in narratives that deal with long events like World War 2.

5) narrative

I=piatlak tete nen kin ru=weswes skot-i-r. Go, ru=lap te-p̃ur rui=pe mat. Rukoi=pe mat.
3SG.RS=have some that REL 3PL.RS=work with-TS-3PL.O and 3PL.RS=many DET-big 3PL.PS=PRF dead 3PL.RS=PRF dead
There are some who worked with them (the Americans). And very many died. They died.

The example(5) shows the perfect proclitics being used to refer to those who are long dead in a narrative sentence.

Traditional stories in Nafsan often use perfect proclitic form as they are set in the past. The example(6) of an extract of a custom story telling also shows that perfective particle pe is not necessary to appear in perfect proclitic sentence.

6) Storytelling

Kaltog i=kel ntak Selwin tefla=n go rakai=ler mai pak esum̃
Kaltag 3SG.RS=hold back Selwin thus=DST and 3DU.PS=return come to LOC-house
Kaltog rubbed Selwin's back like that and they returned to the house. (Note: Thieberger (2006: 111))

==== Bound Object pronoun ====
There are two separate types of object suffix, can be distinguished by the roles they encoded and the host they attached to. One type is for direct objects, the direct object suffixes attached to the object of the predicator to encode it. The other type is for oblique objects, the oblique object suffixes encode typically the location and the case of semi-transitive verbs. Based on the semantics of the semi-transitive verbs in the oblique case, the oblique object suffixes apply to movement to, at, or from a location. There are list of distinctive bound suffix being used in two types of object in table.2.

			Direct Object	Oblique Object	Direct Possessive
1st person	singular		-wou	-wou	-k
1st person	plural	inclusive	-kit	-kit	-kit
1st person	plural	exclusive	-mam/-mom/-m	-mam	-mam/-mom/-m
2nd person	singular		(transitivisor) -k	-wok	-m
2nd person	plural		-mus	-mus	-mus
3rd person	singular		(transitivisor) -ø/ -n	-wes	-n
3rd person	plural		(transitivisor) -r	-wer	-r

===== Direct object =====
Object suffixes encode the object of derived transitive verbs, ambitransitive verbs, ditransitive verbs and of the preposition -ki. To reference an object in Nafsan can be either by an object suffix or a lexical NP. Therefore, object suffix cannot appear in the Verb Complex while there is a referential lexical NP for object indication.

7) transitive verb/ preposition -ki

Ke=fo pes-kerai-ki-k tete nrak, tete nrak, masta nen kin i=wi, i=pes-kerkerai-ki ag m̃as.
3SG.IRR=PSP:IR talk-strong-TR-2SG.O some time some time, boss that REL 3SG.RS=good 3SG.RS=talk-strong-TR 2SG only
He will speak harshly to you, sometimes, sometimes a good boss will just speak harshly to you. (as opposed to beating you) (Note: Thieberger (2006: 116))

This is an example (7) showing how object suffix used in transitive verb. The intransitive verb pes-kerai takes the transitivising suffix -ki to become transitive which allows it to take the object suffix -k in the first use. However, to emphasize the object, the last clause used the focal pronoun ag ‘you(singular)’ instead of the object suffix.

8) ambitransitive verb

I=f wel ku=f tae trok-wes go ka=fo plak-e-r ler.
3SG.RS=COND thus 2SG.RS=COND know agree-3SG.OBL and 1SG.IRR=PSP:IR with-TS-3p.O return
If you agree with it, then I will go back with them. (Thieberger, 2006, p. 116)

In general, ambitransitive verbs requires a transitive suffix before the addition of the object suffix. The example (8) shows that transitive suffix -e is added before the object suffix -r occurred.

9) ditransitive verb

Or ka=fo mer nrik-i-r ki i=skei.
yes 1SG.IRR=PSP:IR in.turn tell-TS-3PL.O PREP 3SG.RS=one
Yes, I will now tell them one (story). (Thieberger, 2006, p. 116)

The object suffix indicates the recipient when it is with a ditransitive verb. The example (9) shows when the suffix -r is used to encode the addresses.

===== Oblique object =====
The oblique suffix has a locational meaning. The oblique case can also be indicating temporal and spatial references. The example shows the suffix -wes encoded the day that the race was held.

10) oblique suffix

Naliati nen rak=fo res-wes me katom i=pei usrek-ki ser nagis.
day this 3DU.IRR=PSP:IR race-3SG.OBL but hermit.crab 3SG.RS=first go.round-TR every point
That day they would race, but the hermit crab was first around every point. (Note: Thieberger (2006: 119))

==== Bound direct possessive pronouns ====
The direct possessive suffix can only be attached to direct possessed nouns and reflexive/reciprocal morpheme yet not being a clitic. The 3 person singular is the most common form of direct possessive pronoun being found, even though there is other direct possessive pronoun see table.2. The following example(11) shows the 3sg direct possessive suffix -r.

11) direct possessive suffix

Gar nen ru=lek-a-Ø ki namt-e-r.
3PL REL 3PL.RS=see-TS-3SG.O PREP eye-V-3PL.DP
It was they who saw it with their own eyes. (Note: Thieberger (2006: 122))

== Common abbreviations ==
Below is a table explaining the common abbreviations used in negation examples above: (Note: Thieberger (2006: xviii-xix))

Abbreviation	Meaning
AD	Addressee deictic
DET	Determiner
DST	Distant
DUR	Durative
IR	Irrealis
IRR	Irrealis subject
NEG	Negative marker
PREP	Preposition
PS	Perfect subject
PSP	Prospective
REL	Relativiser
RS	Realis subject
TR	Transitive marker
TS	Transitive suffix

== Access to resources ==
Thieberger's field recordings have been archived with Paradisec:

- summary of the collection of materials in Nafsan
- listing of all material available via the Open Language Archives Community for Nafsan.

== Notes ==
- Pages from: Thieberger, Nick (2006). A Grammar of South Efate: An Oceanic Language of Vanuatu. Honolulu: University of Hawaii Press. ISBN 9780824830618.
- Other references:
