= Fanbak language =

Austronesian language spoken in Vanuatu

Fanbyak
- Fanbak, Orkon
- Native to: Vanuatu
- Region: Ambrym Island
- Native speakers: 95 (2015)
- Language family: Austronesian: Malayo-Polynesian; Oceanic; Southern Oceanic; North-Central Vanuatu; Central Vanuatu; Fanbyak

Language codes
- ISO 639-3: fnb
- Glottolog: orko1234 Orkon-Fanbak
- ELP: Orkon

Fanbyak is a minor language of Ambrym Island, Vanuatu.

== Name ==
Fanbyak takes its name from the village of the same name, where it used to be spoken. Fanbyak village has been abandoned, with residents now living among speakers of North Ambrym.

Lynch and Crowley (2001) called the language "Orkon". However, it appears that Orkon, spoken in the Orkon village, really referred to a lect (either a dialect or a separate language) distinct from Fanbak. Nothing is known about Orkon proper, which is now extinct.
