= Lewo language =

Austronesian language spoken in Vanuatu

Lewo
- Varsu
- Native to: Vanuatu
- Region: Epi Island
- Native speakers: 2,200 (2001)
- Language family: Austronesian: Malayo-Polynesian; Oceanic; Southern Oceanic; North-Central Vanuatu; Central Vanuatu; Epi-Efate; Epi; Lewo

Language codes
- ISO 639-3: lww
- Glottolog: lewo1242
- Lewo is not endangered according to the classification system of the UNESCO Atlas of the World's Languages in Danger

Lewo (also known as Varsu or Laewo) is an Oceanic language spoken on Epi Island, in Vanuatu.

== Overview ==
Lewo is spoken on the eastern part of Epi Island in Shefa Province. As of 2001, there are approximately 2,200 speakers of Lewo. Despite being the most widely spoken language in eastern Epi, speakers of Lewo can be found in various parts of the island; village settlements are small but widely scattered.

Lewo previously had many more different dialects than it does today, and many lexical items from various Epi languages are said to have originated from Lewo. Tasiko (sometimes Tasiwo), Lemaroro and Maluba (Malupa) are all dialects of Lewo. Many Lewo speakers are bilingual, with proficiency in Bierebo; only the very elderly and very young are monolingual. Lewo is closely related to the Epi language of Lamen, sharing 78% lexical similarity.

== Phonology ==
=== Consonants ===
	Labio- velar	Labial	Alveolar	Dorsal
Nasal	ŋ͡mʷ (Note: /ŋ͡mʷ/ is heard as a non-labialized [ŋ͡m] before /a/ and word-final.)	m	n	ŋ
Plosive	k͡pʷ (Note: /k͡pʷ/ is heard as non-labialized [k͡p] when word-final, and as a voiceless implosive affricate [ɠ̊͡ɓ̥] before /a/.)	p	t	k
Fricative		β	s	
Approximant	w		l	j
Rhotic			r (Note: /r/ is heard as [d͡r] when occurring after /n/.)	

=== Vowels ===
	Front	Back
Close	i	u
Mid	e	o
Open	a	

- /a/ is heard as [æ] when occurring after labial consonants /p, m, β/. It is heard as [a] elsewhere.
- Vowels /e, o, u/ within the peak of closed syllables are heard as [ɛ, ɔ, ʊ].

== Morphology and word classes ==
=== Demonstratives and spatial deixis ===
Lewo identifies four grades of deixis when referencing spatial location. For expressing reference to an object which is located near the speaker, such as in physical contact with the speaker or in the same surrounding area, the deictic particle nini is used. If the object is closer to the hearer, the particle nam̃aa is used. Conversely, if the object in reference is proximity to both speaker and hearer, or within the speaker-hearer interaction, the particle nene is used. The fourth deictic particle, nena, is used to express distal or unknown location.

Lewo's four-way deixis system is atypical from those employed by other Oceanic non-Polynesian and Polynesian languages. Typically, these languages have only three grades of deictic relationship referencing: near speaker, near hearer, and elsewhere.

Lewo has a noun-demonstrative (NDem) word order, as does most other languages in Vanuatu.

kinan-ena nini ka-la lala lua
eat-NOM DEIC POSS-3PL.P 3PL two
'This food is the two of theirs'

sa-na puruvi la nene
POSS-3SG.P brother PL DEIC
'Those brothers of his'

==== Nini ====
Nini marks an explicit reference to an entity which is in proximity or physically connected to the speaker.

kam pununga nap̃a a-si-ke e nini
2PL all REL 2PL.S-be.at-TA LOC DEIC
'All of you who are here'

yo-marava nini
place-clear DEIC
'The world'

==== Nam̃aa ====
Nam̃aa is employed when referencing objects within the proximity of the hearer, such as objects the hearer is carrying.

o-kus mapu-u nam̃aa o-kom pe
2SG.S-carry grandchild-1SG.P DEIC 2SG.S-pass where
'Where are you carrying my grandchild there to?'

Early also notes an additional pragmatic function to this particle, whereby it is employed by speakers to request an object be brought to the location of the hearer. See example (6) below demonstrating an interaction between a father (speaker) and mother (hearer) about their child.

ka yaru nam̃aa
(excl) person DEIC
'Look at that fellow there'

Despite the father being located closer to the child (and thus would typically employ nini), he uses nam̃aa to request the mother to aid their child instead of himself.

==== Nene ====
Because nene is used to address entities near both speaker and hearer, it is also frequently employed for general unmarked deictic references. Due to this general use, it often mimics the function of a definite article. As Lewo only has an indefinite article tai ('a', 'one'), it seems nene functions in place of the definite.

yaru nene na-e pe
man DEIC GEN-LOC where
'Where is this/that/the guy from?'

lala telu nene a-puyu a-pa metava
3PL three DEIC 3PL.S-R.climb 3PL.S-R.go above
'These three/the three of them climbed up'

==== Nena ====
While not frequently used, nena can be employed to indicate spatial reference.

a-kom e pulu-mara-n mrae nena a-pimi
3PL.S-pass LOC hole-face-3SG.P sun DEIC 3PL.S-R.come
'They came out of the sun there'

While the particle is known to reference distal or unknown location, Early notes a more common function of nena, in which it presents an identified object, providing importance or instancy to it. See examples (10) and (11).

a-visa legiana nena
2PL.S-I.say day DEIC
'You should announce the exact day'

a kolemalo nena ø-kus viyu
CONJ night DEIC 3SG.S-carry gun
'That very night he took his gun'

==== Deictic clitics ====
The Lewo deictic particles, with the exception of nam̃aa, can each be shortened to a monosyllabic form in order to cliticise to other words. Early gives an example of this cliticisation with deictic particles following the preposition e.

e 'nene → 'e-ne
e 'nini → 'e-ni*
*with high vowel deletion, occurs as en

This cliticisation can occur with various nouns and verbs. For instance, the word for 'man' 'yaru + 'nene becomes 'yar-ne 'that man'. The verb 'be like' 'sa + 'nini occurs as 'sa-n(i) 'like this'.

==== Nap̃a ====
In Lewo, the relative pronoun nap̃a functions as a deictic. to equate to the English 'the aforementioned'. Despite being glossed as REL, it acts as a discourse-level deictic in many instances.

Additionally, ap̃a functions as an anaphoric deictic particle. That is, it functions to provide anaphoric reference to an already-introduced entity. It is also employed to refer to entities part of real-life environment, or shared knowledge of the interlocutors.

a-m̃e pui nap̃a ana a-si-lua la-na kompasia
3PL.S-R.kill pig REL CONJ 3PL.S-cut-out leg-3SG.P side
'They killed the/that pig, and cut off one of its legs'

In example (13), nap̃a appears before the conjunction ana. As the conjunction is part of the following clause, nap̃a functions here to bring an entity (pui 'pig') into the foreground.

Nap̃a also interacts frequently with the main deictic system in Lewo. As the function of nene can be often be described as an anaphoric reference marker, it is often cliticised with nap̃a and as such produces the form nap̃a-ni. Such cliticisation also occurs with the other deictic particles, producing nap̃a-na and nap̃a-ne. See example (14):

Ana yoko na ø-sa nap̃a kie-la kumai na narin kumali tai ø-te-ke si ø-lavisi-ni-a na narin kumai nap̃a-na naga-na ne sira tai ø-te-ke e-a.
CONJ FUT EMPH 3SG.S-be.like REL POSS-3PL.P village EMPH small village ART 3SG.S-be.at-TA again 3SG.S-close-TR-3SG.O EMPH small village REL-DEIC 3SG-EMPH DEIC woman ART 3SG.S-be.at-TA LOC-3SG.O
'And it was like their village / another small village was close to it / and at this village there was a woman living there'

In this example, the 'small village' narin kumali is introduced with tai (ART). In the following line, it is reintroduced as narin kumali nap̃a-na (REL-DEIC).

Another function of nap̃a as a deictic particle occurs when referring to real-world knowledge, or shared knowledge by all interlocutors. For instance, if asked where some people might be, a speaker may respond in one of two ways:

a-pa ke lokove
3PL.S-R.go TA garden
'They are at the garden'

a-pa ke lokove nap̃a
3PL.S-R.go TA garden REL
'They are at the garden'

Example (15) has the unmarked case, and indicates that the people in question went to the garden that they are most likely to go to, such as their own garden. However, the addition of nap̃a in example (16) indicates a separate garden understood by both interlocutors.

This method of deixis is frequently used in Lewo, and can be used in many pragmatic contexts, to expressing deprecating, or euphemistic expressions, as shown in example (17).

ya nap̃a
what REL
'What on earth is that?'

==== Deixis in noun phrases ====
Deictic particles which occur in noun phrases can not only modify nominal heads, but also function as the noun heads themselves.

ko, o-to-tano e nam̃aa, inu ne-to-tano e nini
2SG, 2SG.S-sit-down LOC DEIC 1SG 1SG.S-sit-down LOC DEIC
'OK, you sit down there, I'll sit down here'

Example (19) shows nam̃aa and nini as the prepositional object of e. That is, instead of functioning as a determiner to a noun, it acts as a preposition.

ko, o-to-tano e na-nini, inu ne-to-tano e na-nam̃aa
2SG 2SG.S-sit-down LOC NOM-DEIC 1SG 1SG.S-sit.down LOC NOM-DEIC
'OK, you sit down on this one, I'll sit down on that one (near you)'

Example (18) shows that deictics can act additionally as nominal heads. Early notes that three of the four Lewo deictics (with the exception of nena), with the prefix na- added, act as demonstrative pronouns. See examples below:

na-nini
NOM-DEIC
'This one'

na-nam̃aa
NOM-DEIC
'The one there near you'

na-nene
NOM-DEIC
'That one'

==== Deixis in interrogatives ====
The deictic particle nape is used to ask 'which?' in Lewo.

o-wulu lole nape?
2SG.S-l.buy lolly which
'Which lolly do you want to buy?'

o-wulu nape?
2SG.S-l.buy which
'Which (one) will you buy?'

Example (21) demonstrates nape in the position normally occupied by constituents that modify the phrase. Example (22) shows nape as the head of the phrase.

Occasionally, nape occurs in a non-interrogative form.

naga ø-sape o-kilia o-la nape nap̃a o-kekara-ni-a
3SG 3SG.S-say 2SG.S-can 2SG.S-take which REL 2SG.S-glad-TR-3SG.O
'She said you can have whichever you like'

== Bibliography ==
- Early, Robert (1994). A grammar of Lewo, Vanuatu (PhD dissertation). Canberra: The Australian National University. doi:10.25911/5D723CAC6B4A2.
