= North Efate language =

Austronesian language spoken in Vanuatu

North Efate
- Nakanamanga
- Nguna
- Region: Efate, Vanuatu
- Native speakers: 9,500 (2001)
- Language family: Austronesian: Malayo-Polynesian; Oceanic; Southern Oceanic; North-Central Vanuatu; Central Vanuatu; Epi-Efate; Efate; North Efate

Language codes
- ISO 639-3: llp
- Glottolog: nort2836
- North Efate is not endangered according to the classification system of the UNESCO Atlas of the World's Languages in Danger

A Nakanamanga, or North Efate, speaker.

North Efate, also known as Nakanamanga or Nguna, is an Oceanic language spoken on the northern area of Efate in Vanuatu, as well as on a number of islands off the northern coast – including Nguna, and parts of Tongoa, Emae and Epi.

The population of speakers is recorded to be 9,500. This makes Nakanamanga one of the largest languages of Vanuatu, an archipelago known for having the world's highest linguistic density.

== Phonology ==
The consonant and vowels sounds of North Efate (Nguna).

Consonant sounds
		Labial	Dental	Velar
Plosive	plain	p	t̪	k
Plosive	implosive	ɓʷ		
Fricative		v	s	
Nasal	plain	m	n	ŋ
Nasal	prenasal	ᵑm		
Liquid			l r	
Semivowel		w		

Vowel sounds
	Front	Central	Back
High	i		u
Mid	e		o
Low		a	

Subdialects of North Efate include:

- Buninga
- Emau
- Livara
- Nguna
- Paunangis
- Sesake
