= Lelepa =

Lelepa can refer to:

- Lelepa (island), an island in Vanuatu
- Lelepa language, an Oceanic language spoken on that island
- Lelepa, Samoa, a village on Savai'i, Samoa
