= ULB =

ULB may refer to:

- the IATA code for Ulei Airport in Ulei, Vanuatu
- "Ultralight Beam", a song by American hip hop artist Kanye West
- Underwater locator beacon, a device fitted to aviation flight recorders
- Free University of Brussels (Université libre de Bruxelles), a university in Belgium between 1834 and 1969
- Université libre de Bruxelles, a university in Belgium from 1970 onwards
- Urban local body, a representative body in India
- Universitäts- und Landesbibliothek (University and State Library Darmstadt, University and State Library Düsseldorf)
