= Lonwolwol language =

Austronesian language spoken in Vanuatu

Lonwolwol
- West Ambrym, Raljago, Craig Cove
- Native to: Vanuatu
- Region: Ambrym Island
- Native speakers: (1,200 cited 2001)
- Language family: Austronesian: Malayo-Polynesian; Oceanic; Southern Oceanic; North-Central Vanuatu; Central Vanuatu; Lonwolwol

Language codes
- ISO 639-3: crc
- Glottolog: lonw1238
- ELP: Raljago
- Approximate location within Vanuatu, on the western tip of Ambrym Island Lonwolwol language (Oceania)
- Coordinates: 16°15′54″S 167°55′28″E

Lonwolwol, West Ambrym, or Raljago is an Oceanic language of Vanuatu. It is spoken by about 1,200 people on the western portion of Ambrym Island.

== Geographic distribution ==
Lonwolwol is spoken in villages around Craig Cove on the western tip of Ambrym Island. It may have been used by a Presbyterian mission on Ambrym as a lingua franca throughout the northern and western portions of the island.

Lonwolwol's geographic limits are not well established, due in part to limited documentation of any language on Ambrym Island, and in part to similarities between Lonwolwol and some other Ambrym languages, which are believed to form a dialect chain.

== Phonology ==
The main documentation of Lonwolwol comes from a dictionary published by a local missionary rather than a professional linguist or ethnographer, with a great deal of phonological variation. As such, the IPA charts below are estimates of the phonemic inventory.

=== Consonants ===
Lonwolwol consonants
	Bilabial or Labiodental		Alveolar		Palatal	Velar		Glottal
Plosive		b	t	d		k	ɡ	
Fricative	f	v	s					h
Nasal		m		n	ɲ		ŋ	
Trill				r				
Approximant		w			j			
Lateral approximant				l				

=== Vowels ===
Lonwolwol monophthongs
	Front	Central	Back
Close	i	ʉ	u
Close-mid	e		o
Open		a	
