= Maii language =

Austronesian language spoken in Vanuatu

Maii
- Mkir
- Native to: Vanuatu
- Region: Epi Island
- Ethnicity: 260 (2001)
- Native speakers: 180 (2001)
- Language family: Austronesian: Malayo-Polynesian; Oceanic; Southern Oceanic; North-Central Vanuatu; Central Vanuatu; Epi-Efate; Epi; Maii

Language codes
- ISO 639-3: mmm
- Glottolog: maii1238
- ELP: Mkir
- Maii is not endangered according to the classification system of the UNESCO Atlas of the World's Languages in Danger

Maii (Mae) is an Oceanic language spoken on Epi Island, in Vanuatu.
