= Vovo language =

Vovo language may refer to two different languages spoken in Vanuatu:

- A dialect of (or a language closely related to) the Vao language, spoken on the northern coast of Malakula Island
- A dialect of the endangered Bieria language, spoken on Epi Island
