= Emiotungan =

Emiotungan Meltungon
- Village
- Emiotungan village, with tamtam.

- Location in Vanuatu
- Coordinates: 16°14′56″S 167°57′5″E
- Country: Vanuatu
- Province: Malampa Province
- Island: Ambrym

Population (2009)
  - Total: 70
- Time zone: UTC+11 (VUT)

Nasara, cult place of Emiotungan.

Emiotungan, also Meltungon, is an inland village of about 70 inhabitants in the southwestern part of the island of Ambrym in Vanuatu.

Emiotungan, which means house of fight in the local Daakaka language, has a recognized nasara, a cult place used for ceremonies. It also has a Presbyterian church, an anglophone primary school shared with the coastal village of Baiap, and two guest houses for visitors.

== Transportation ==
Connected to the airfield of Craig Cove by dirt road, it has an access road to the caldera with the two active volcanoes, Mt. Benbow and Mt. Marum.
