= Eton language (Vanuatu) =

Austronesian language spoken in Vanuatu

Eton
- Native to: Vanuatu
- Region: Efate
- Native speakers: (500 cited 1989 census)
- Language family: Austronesian: Malayo-Polynesian; Oceanic; Southern Oceanic; North-Central Vanuatu; Central Vanuatu; Epi-Efate; Efate; Eton

Language codes
- ISO 639-3: etn
- Glottolog: eton1255
- ELP: Eton
- Eton is not endangered according to the classification system of the UNESCO Atlas of the World's Languages in Danger

Eton is a small Oceanic language of Vanuatu, in the southeast of Efate Island.
