= Lonwolwol =

- Abandoned village
- Location in Vanuatu
- Coordinates: 16°13′29″S 167°56′25″E
- Country: Vanuatu
- Province: Malampa Province
- Island: Ambrym
- Time zone: UTC+11 (VUT)

Lonwolwol was a village on the island Ambrym in Vanuatu.

== Destruction ==
The village had a hospital that was destroyed in a volcanic eruption in 1913. As a result of the eruption a new lake called Lake Fanteng has been formed partially on the site of the former village.
