= Epi languages =

Oceanic language group of Vanuatu

Epi
- Api
- Geographic distribution: East Vanuatu, Epi Island
- Linguistic classification: Austronesian: Malayo-Polynesian; Oceanic; Southern Oceanic; North-Central Vanuatu; Central Vanuatu; Epi-Efate; Epi
- Proto-language: Proto-Epi

Language codes
- ISO 639-3: –
- Glottolog: epii1237

The half dozen Epi languages are spoken on Epi Island in Vanuatu.

The population of Epi Island was over 14,000 before being reduced to 800 in the early 20th century due to economic exploitation and introduced disease. As of 2001, the population of these languages had climbed back to 4,400.

== Languages ==
The languages are:

- Baki–Bierebo: Baki (Burumba), Bierebo (Bonkovia-Yevali)
- Bieria–Maii: Bieria (Vovo), Maii (Mkir)
- Lamen–Lewo: Lamen (Lamenu, Varmali), Lewo (Varsu)
