= Southeast Ambrym language =

Austronesian language spoken in Vanuatu

Southeast Ambrym
- Taveak
- Native to: Vanuatu
- Region: Ambrym Island
- Native speakers: 3,700 (2001)
- Language family: Austronesian: Malayo-Polynesian; Oceanic; Southern Oceanic; North-Central Vanuatu; Central Vanuatu; Southeast Ambrym

Language codes
- ISO 639-3: tvk
- Glottolog: sout2859
- Southeast Ambrym is not endangered according to the classification system of the UNESCO Atlas of the World's Languages in Danger

Southeast Ambrym, Vatlongos, or Taveak, is a language of Ambrym Island, Vanuatu. It is closely related to Paamese.

== Phonology ==
=== Consonants ===
Consonants
		Labial	Alveolar	Velar	Glottal
Nasal		m	n	ŋ	
Stop	voiceless	p	t	k	
Stop	prenasal	ᵐb	ⁿd	ᵑɡ	
Fricative		v	s	x	h
Lateral			l		
Trill			r		

=== Vowels ===
Vowels
	Front	Back
High	i	u
Mid	e	o
Low	æ	a
