= BKI =

BKI may refer to:

- The airport code of Kota Kinabalu International Airport
- The ISO 639-3 code of Baki language, Epi Island, Vanuatu
- BKI (Bijdragen Koninklijk Instituut), the abbreviated name of the journal Bijdragen tot de Taal-, Land- en Volkenkunde
