= Valesdir Airport =

Airport in Vanuatu

- IATA: VLS; ICAO: NVSV

Summary
- Airport type: Public
- Serves: Valesdir, Épi Island, Vanuatu
- Elevation AMSL: 10 ft / 3 m
- Coordinates: 16°47′46″S 168°10′37″E

Map
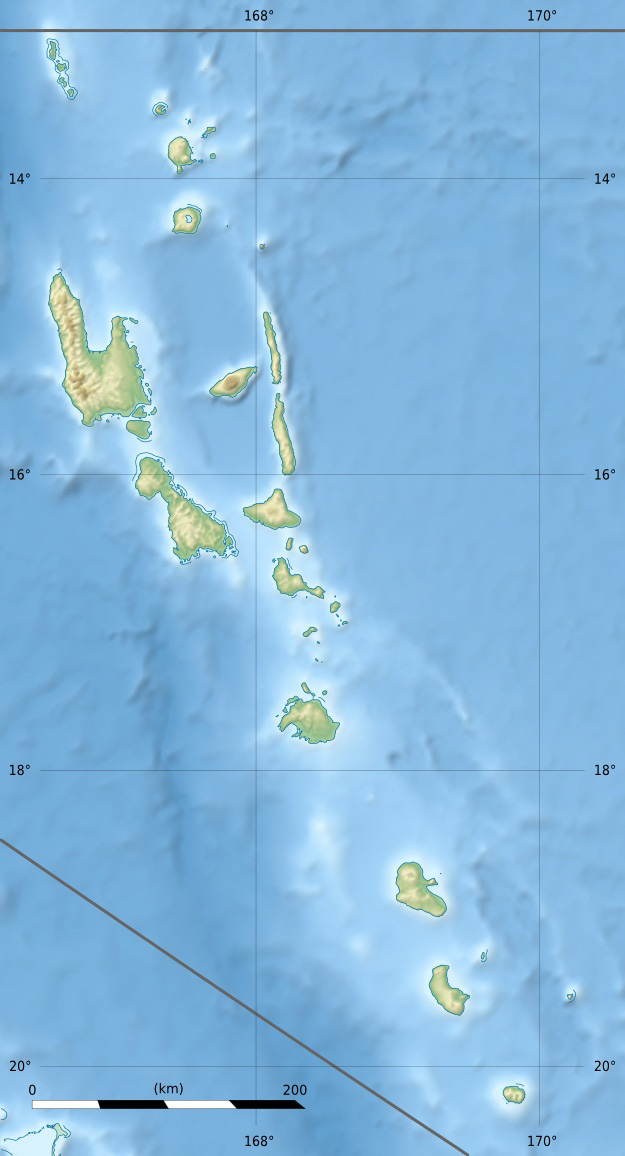
- Location of airport in Vanuatu

Runways
Direction	Length		Surface
Direction	m	ft	Surface
	600	1,969

Valesdir Airport is an airport in Valesdir, Epi, Vanuatu (IATA: VLS, ICAO: NVSV).
