= North Ambrym language =

Austronesian language spoken in Vanuatu

North Ambrym
- Native to: Vanuatu
- Region: Ambrym Island
- Native speakers: 5,300 (2001)
- Language family: Austronesian: Malayo-Polynesian; Oceanic; Southern Oceanic; North-Central Vanuatu; Central Vanuatu; North Ambrym

Language codes
- ISO 639-3: mmg
- Glottolog: nort2839
- ELP: North Ambrym
- North Ambrym is not endangered according to the classification system of the UNESCO Atlas of the World's Languages in Danger

North Ambrym is a language of Ambrym Island, Vanuatu.

== Dialects ==
Today there are two main dialects of North Ambrym, levelled from a previous five or six due to population movements towards the coast. The Western dialect (spoken in Lonhali district) is better documented than the North-Eastern dialect (spoken in Wowan district).

== Phonology ==
=== Consonants ===
		Bilabial			Labio- dental			Alveolar		Post-alv./ Palatal	Velar	Glottal
		plain	lab.	pal.	plain	lab.	pal.	plain	pal.	Post-alv./ Palatal	Velar	Glottal
Plosive		b	bʷ	bʲ				t			k	
Affricate										tʃ		
Nasal		m	mʷ					n	nʲ		ŋ	
Rhotic	trill							r				
Rhotic	tap							ɾ				
Fricative		β		βʲ	f	fʷ	fʲ	s			ɣ	h
Approximant		w						l		j		

- /r/ can have an allophone of [d̚] in free variation in word-final position.

=== Vowels ===
	Front	Back
Close	i	u
Near-close		ʊ
Mid	e	o
Near-open	æ	
Open	a	

- Sounds /i, e/ are heard as [ɪ, ɛ] in closed syllables.

== Grammar ==
=== Noun Phrases ===
There are two classes of nouns – free nouns that occur independently or bound nouns that require a possessor, either a pronominal suffix or a possessor noun phrase. Some nouns alternate between free and bound classes.

Nouns can also be derived from verbs using two clitics: instruments are derived with a= and abstract nouns are derived with =an.

Free pronouns distinguish between singular, dual, paucal, and plural numbers, and distinguish inclusive and exclusive first person.

		Singular	Dual	Paucal	Plural
1st person	inclusive	ni	kerong	kesul, kensul	ken
1st person	exclusive	ni	gemaro	gemasul	gema
2nd person		neng	gomoro	gomosul	gimi
3rd person		nge	nyero	nyesul	nyer

Non-singular third-person pronouns can be used to quantify nominals, and paucal and plural third-person pronouns can be used to quantify over proper names, signifying a group containing that person.

Nominal modifiers (such as adjectives, possessor nominals, quantifiers, numerals, and relative clauses) generally follow the head nominal. There are four deictic demonstratives (two proximal, one medial, and one distal) which must be introduced by either the subordinate clause marker ge or the topic marker nge. The numeral hu 'one' can appear directly after the head nominal to indicate a specific indefinite, and non-specific indefinites are marked with te hu and only occur in negative or irrealis clauses. Te hu can also function as a pronominal meaning 'no one'.

Noun phrases can be coordinated with the verb kirine 'be with' or the third person dual free pronoun nyero, or with disjunctive o which is also used to coordinate clauses.

=== Verb phrases ===
The verbal complex can contain the following elements, with optional elements in brackets:

(potential)	subject indexing particle	(tense/mood/negation)	(aspect)	verb	(compound)	(-valence increasing suffix)

In addition the subject indexing particle can take tense prefixes and tense or mood suffixes.

Verbs can be transitive or intransitive.

Dynamic intransitive verbs can take preposition phrases as oblique arguments and a subset can have their valency changed by the applicative suffix Ci-. Stative/inchoative intransitive verbs select a patient subject, and are interpreted as stative or inchoative depending on the aspect marking. When marked with the non-recent past tense marker, these are interpreted as perfective stative verbs, while the recent past marker is interpreted as imperfective and inchoative. A subset of stative/inchoative verbs can be transitivised with the transitive suffix -ne, which also makes the subject the agent. m-initial stative/inchoative verbs begin with /m/ and are derived from the Proto-Oceanic stative verb prefix *ma-, though only one has a non-stative equivalent remaining.

While there is a small group of morphologically simple transitive verbs, a large group are derived from semitransitive verbs with the transitive suffix -ne. Semitransitive verbs have a transitive meaning and a derived transitive form but only allow restricted objects.

Non-verbal predicates are also possible in topic-comment constructions, and have to include the topic marker nge.

=== Possession ===
In North Ambrym there are two main possessive constructions – direct and indirect possession. Direct possession patterns predominantly with inalienable possession where the relationship between possessor and possessed is more permanent, such as kinship terms, body parts and parts of wholes. Indirect possession patterns predominantly with alienable possession where the relationship between possessor and possessed is less permanent, and more easily removed from the possessor.

==== Direct Possession ====
Direct possessive constructions are so called as a pronominal possessor can be directly suffixed to the possessed noun:^{:219}

rahe-ng
mother-1SG
‘my mother’

When the possessor is a personal noun, such as a proper name, the possessor is juxtaposed to the directly possessed noun:^{:219}

rahe John
mother john
‘John’s mother’

When the possessor is a common noun, the possessed noun is suffixed by a linking morpheme known as a construct suffix, which is then followed by the possessor noun:^{:102}

ye-n vanten
leg-CST person
‘the person’s leg’

Direct possessive constructions cover the following semantic relationships:^{:225-231}

- Kinship terms, such as rahen ‘his/her mother’ and taalan ‘his/her brother’.
- External body parts, such as woulun ‘his/her hair’ and veran ‘his/her hand’.
- Non-human external body parts, such as lengate ‘its scales’ and byúte ‘its wing’.
- Some body by-products, such as mihun ‘his/her urine’ and túlúte ‘its egg’.
- Intrinsic and intimate possessions, such as tolon ‘his/her voice’ and towon ‘his penis-sheath’.
- Parts of wholes, such as kilite ‘its meat’, tangvate ‘its broken piece’.

==== Indirect Possession ====
In indirect possessive constructions a pronominal possessor is not able to suffix directly to the possessed noun, but instead attaches to one of a set of possessive classifiers:^{:232}

a-n to
POSS.CL-3SG chicken
‘his/her chicken’

When the possessor is a lexical noun phrase, there is a word order change, with the possessed noun occurring before the possessive classifier. When the possessor is a personal noun, such as a proper name, the possessor phrase follows the possessive classifier, with no intervening morphology:^{:232}

barrbarr a Massing
pig POSS.CL Massing
‘Massing’s pig’

When the possessor is a common noun, the possessive classifier noun is suffixed by the linking construct suffix, which is then followed by the possessor noun:^{:96}

meyee a-n vanten
food POSS.CL-CST person
‘a/the person’s food’

There are five different possessive classifiers in North Ambrym that are used with different types of possessions:^{:239-243;}^{:97}

- The ye-/a- classifier covers the semantic domains of food, such as meyee ‘food’; animals, such as bwehel ‘bird’; tools, such as ayi ‘machete’; units of time, such as huwo ‘year’; fruit (and the trees that bear them), such as beta ‘breadfruit’; and some kinship terms, such as ina ‘paternal auntie’.
- The mwe-/ma- classifier covers liquids, such as we ‘water’; containers of liquids, such as bwelaye ‘container (i.e. cup/bottle)’; buildings, such as im ‘house’; holes, such as tuye ‘tree hollow’; and mats, such as hul ‘mat’.
- The bo- classifier covers fire related items, such as fyang ‘fire’ and yem ‘firewood’.
- The to- classifier covers different types of baskets, such as arrbol ‘basket’.
- The mwene-/mwena- classifier is the general or residual classifier and covers items not included with the other classifiers. This includes items such as derived nominals mese=an ‘sickness’; and some kinship terms, such as metahal ‘sister’.

==== Overlap ====
Overlap or fluidity is when a possessed noun can occur in different possessive constructions. In many Oceanic languages, nouns that are directly possessed can be indirectly possessed, and nouns that are indirectly possessed by one classifier can occur with different classifiers, depending upon the interaction between the possessor and possessed. However, in North Ambrym, directly possessed nouns are unable to occur in indirect possessive constructions. Furthermore, there is a lack of overlap or fluidity between nouns that occur in indirect possession. For example, the noun we ‘water’ only occurs with the classifier for liquids, mwe-/ma-, and never with the general or residual classifier, mwene-/mwena-:^{:95}

Grammatical:

mwe-ng we
POSS.CL-1SG water
‘my water (for drinking, washing etc.)’

Ungrammatical:

*Mwene-ng we
POSS.CL-1SG water
Intended: ‘my water’

This more rigid collocation between noun and classifier has been described as non-canonical grammatical gender, as rigid assignment between a noun and a gender marker is a feature of grammatical gender rather than of classifiers. The North Ambrym classifier system is a potential emergent stage towards the development of a grammatical gender system.
