= Bierebo language =

Austronesian language spoken in Vanuatu

Bierebo
- Native to: Vanuatu
- Region: Epi Island
- Ethnicity: 1,140 (no date)
- Native speakers: (800 cited 2001)
- Language family: Austronesian: Malayo-Polynesian; Oceanic; Southern Oceanic; North-Central Vanuatu; Central Vanuatu; Epi-Efate; Epi; Bierebo

Language codes
- ISO 639-3: bnk
- Glottolog: bier1244
- ELP: Bierebo
- Bierebo is classified as Vulnerable by the UNESCO Atlas of the World's Languages in Danger.

Bierebo, or Bonkovia-Yevali, is an Oceanic language spoken on Epi Island, in Vanuatu.
