= Bieria language =

Austronesian language spoken in Vanuatu

Bieria
- Vovo
- Native to: Vanuatu
- Region: Epi Island
- Ethnicity: 100 (2006?)
- Native speakers: 70 (2006)
- Language family: Austronesian: Malayo-Polynesian; Oceanic; Southern Oceanic; North-Central Vanuatu; Central Vanuatu; Epi-Efate; Epi; Bieria
- Dialects: Bieria; Vovo

Language codes
- ISO 639-3: brj
- Glottolog: bier1246
- ELP: Bieria; Vovo
- Bieria is classified as Critically Endangered by the UNESCO Atlas of the World's Languages in Danger.

Bieria is an Oceanic language spoken on Epi Island, in Vanuatu.

== Names ==
The alternate names for Bieria are Bieri, Vovo and Wowo.
