= Iriwiti Lep =

Island in Vanuatu

- Interactive map of Iriwiti Lep

Geography
- Location: Pacific Ocean
- Coordinates: 17.814°S 168.467°E
- Archipelago: Vanuatu

Administration
- Vanuatu
- Province: Shefa Province

Demographics
- Population: 0 (2015)

Iriwiti Lep is a small uninhabited island in the Pacific Ocean, a part of the Shefa Province of Vanuatu.

== Geography ==
The island lies off the south coast of Efate Island.
