= Baki language =

Austronesian language spoken in Vanuatu

Baki
- Burumba
- Native to: Vanuatu
- Region: Epi Island
- Native speakers: (350 cited 2001)
- Language family: Austronesian: Malayo-Polynesian; Oceanic; Southern Oceanic; North-Central Vanuatu; Central Vanuatu; Epi-Efate; Epi; Baki

Language codes
- ISO 639-3: bki
- Glottolog: baki1244
- ELP: Baki
- Baki is classified as Vulnerable by the UNESCO Atlas of the World's Languages in Danger.

Baki (or Burumba) is an Oceanic language spoken on Epi Island, in Vanuatu.

== Names ==
The alternate names for Baki are Burumba and Paki.
