= Lelepa language =

Austronesian language spoken in Vanuatu

Lelepa
- Havannah Harbour
- Native to: Vanuatu
- Region: Efate
- Native speakers: (400 cited 1989 census)
- Language family: Austronesian: Malayo-Polynesian; Oceanic; Southern Oceanic; North-Central Vanuatu; Central Vanuatu; Epi-Efate; Efate; Lelepa

Language codes
- ISO 639-3: lpa
- Glottolog: lele1267
- ELP: Lelepa
- Lelepa is not endangered according to the classification system of the UNESCO Atlas of the World's Languages in Danger

Lelepa (Havannah Harbour) is a small Oceanic language of Vanuatu, spoken on Lelepa, off northwest Efate Island.
