= Efate =

Vanuatu island

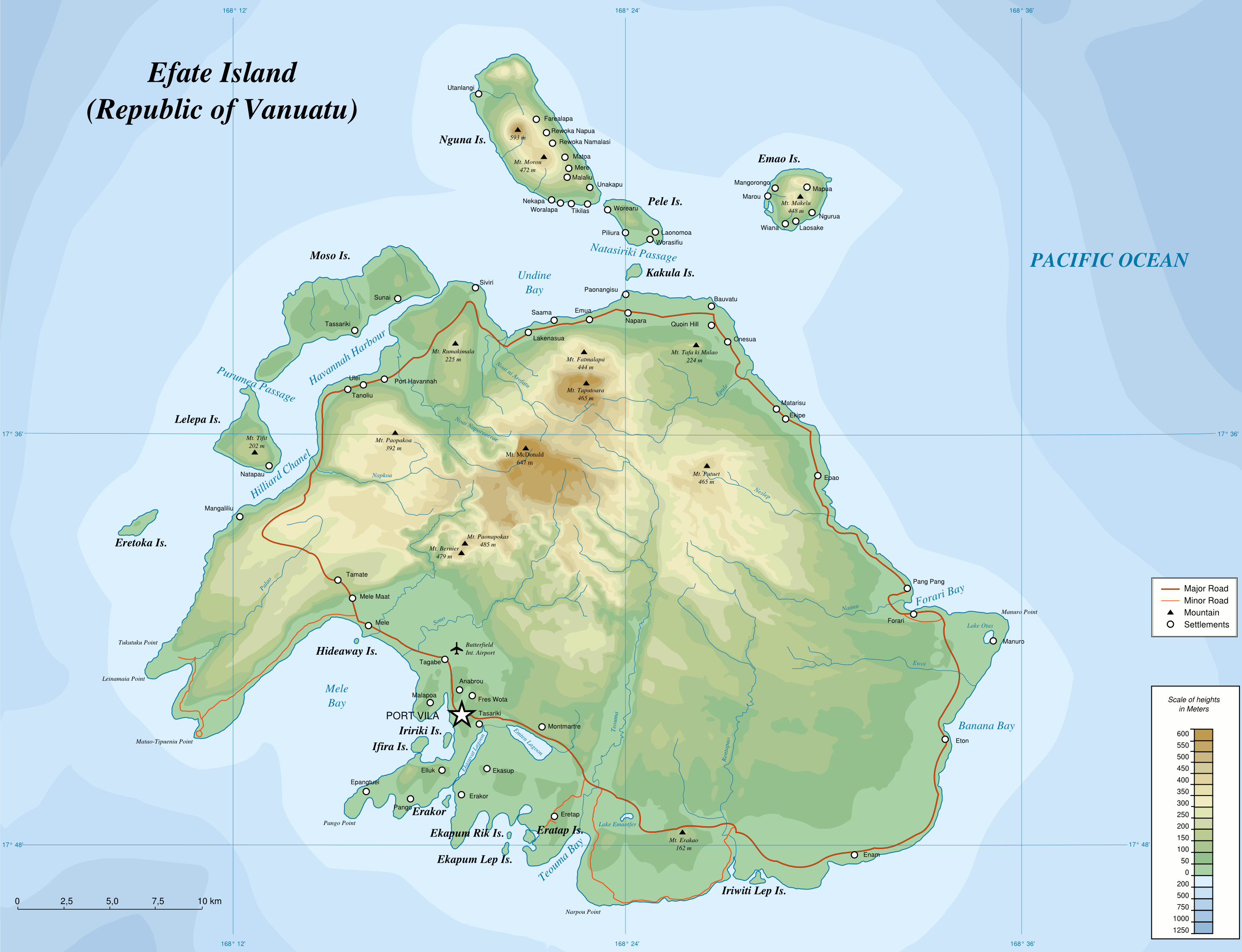
- Map of Efate

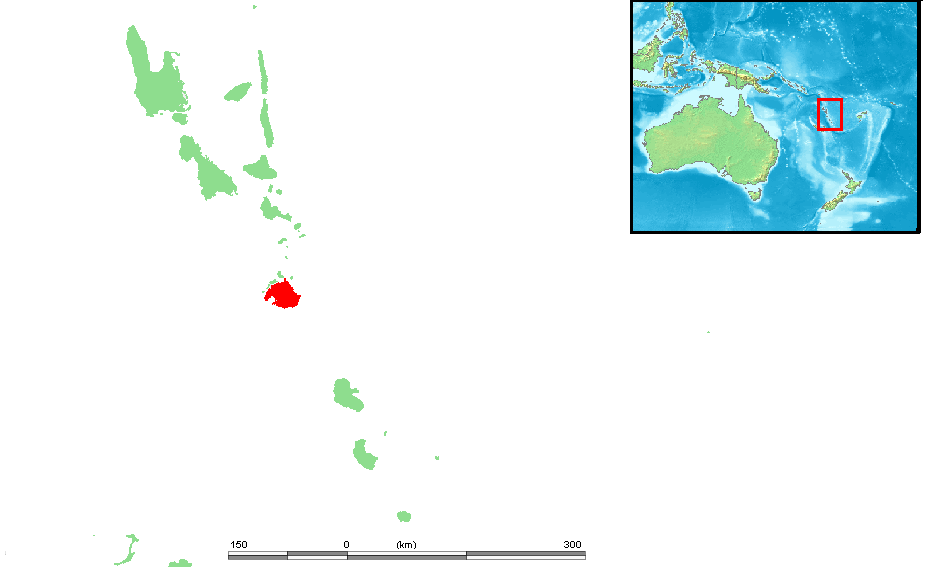

Geography
- Location: Pacific Ocean
- Coordinates: 17°40′S 168°25′E
- Archipelago: Vanuatu
- Area: 899.5 km^{2} (347.3 sq mi)
- Highest elevation: 647 m (2123 ft)
- Highest point: Mount McDonald

Administration
- Vanuatu
- Province: Shefa Province
- Largest settlement: Port Vila

Demographics
- Population: 66,000 (2010)
- Pop. density: 55.6/km^{2} (144/sq mi)

Efate (French: Éfaté), originally named Sandwich Island and also known as Île Vate (French: [il vat]) or just Vate, is an island in the Pacific Ocean. It is part of the Shefa Province in Vanuatu, and the capital city, Port Vila, is located on the island.

== History ==
Captain James Cook named the island Sandwich Island in honour of his patron, the Earl of Sandwich, on his 1774 voyage on HMS Resolution.

The island was referred to by its French name, Île Vate, or simply Vate, in newspaper reports in 1850 and 1851, when it was visited by the Royal Navy vessel HMS Havannah

Coconut trees were planted on large plantations by European settlers in the islands in the late 1800s, owing to the growing demand for copra, the dried flesh of the coconut that contains the oil. The first of these coconut plantations was on Efate, planted in 1877.

During the 19th century, Australian, British, French, and German settlers settled in the territory of the New Hebrides. In 1878, the United Kingdom and France declared all of the New Hebrides to be neutral territory. In 1887, the Anglo-French Joint Naval Commission took charge of the territory. On 9 August 1889, Franceville, an area around present-day Port Vila, declared itself an independent commune under the leadership of elected mayor/president Ferdinand-Albert Chevillard, and with its own red, white and blue flag with five stars. It became one of the first self-governing nations in recorded history to practice universal suffrage without distinction of sex or race. However, the new government was soon suppressed, and by June 1890, Franceville as a commune was reported to have been "practically broken up", with the Naval Commission resuming control.

Between 1903 and 1905, one of the first major geological works of Melanesia was produced by Australian geologist Sir Douglas Mawson (later renowned for his expeditions to Antarctica). After spending from April to September 1903 exploring the islands with W.T. Quaife, Mawson produced a report which included geological maps of the islands of Efate and Santo. This was his first major independent geological work. The men travelled to the islands aboard the Ysabel, under the auspices of the British Deputy Commissioner of the New Hebrides, Captain Ernest Rason. (Note: AKA British resident commissioner, 1902-1907) HMS Archer was also used on the trip. Mawson's detailed report, "The Geology of the New Hebrides", was published in the Proceedings of the Linnean Society of New South Wales in December 1905.

In 1906, the naval commission was replaced by a more structured British-French Condominium.

During World War II, Efate served an important role as a United States military base.

On 13 March 2015, Port Vila, the island's largest human settlement and the capital of Vanuatu, bore extensive damage from Cyclone Pam. In December 2024, a magnitude 7.3 earthquake reportedly damaged almost every single house on Efate, resulting in 19 fatalities. The United Nations Office for the Coordination of Humanitarian Affairs estimated that 116,000 people had been directly affected by the earthquake, equivalent to a third of Vanuatu's population.

== Geography ==
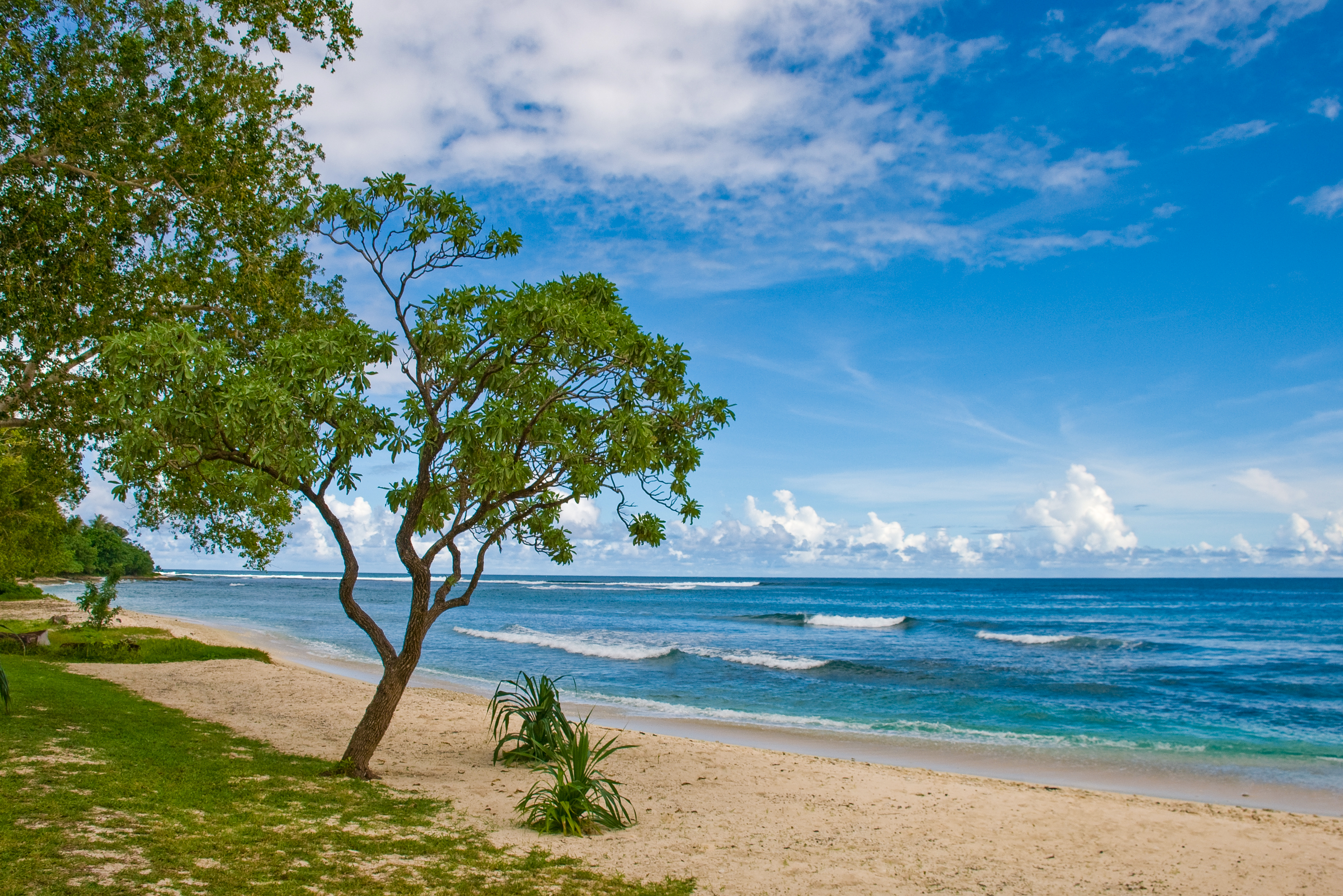
Eratap, a small outer island

Efate's land area of 899.5 square kilometres (347.3 sq mi) makes it Vanuatu's third largest island.

Its geological past was heavily volcanic, meaning that a lava shelf surrounds much of the island. Its highest mountain is Mount Macdonald, with a height of 647 metres (2,123 ft). The terrain is rugged.

Efate's climate is warm and humid, and the island mostly covered by tropical rainforest.

Port Vila is the capital city, and lies on the southwest coast in Shefa Province. Its harbour is Mélé Bay. Pango is a community located on the southern coast of Efate, 7 km (4.3 mi) away from Port Vila, and is considered peri-urban.

On the other side of the island, on the northwest coast, is the village of Port Havannah.

=== Small islands off Efate ===
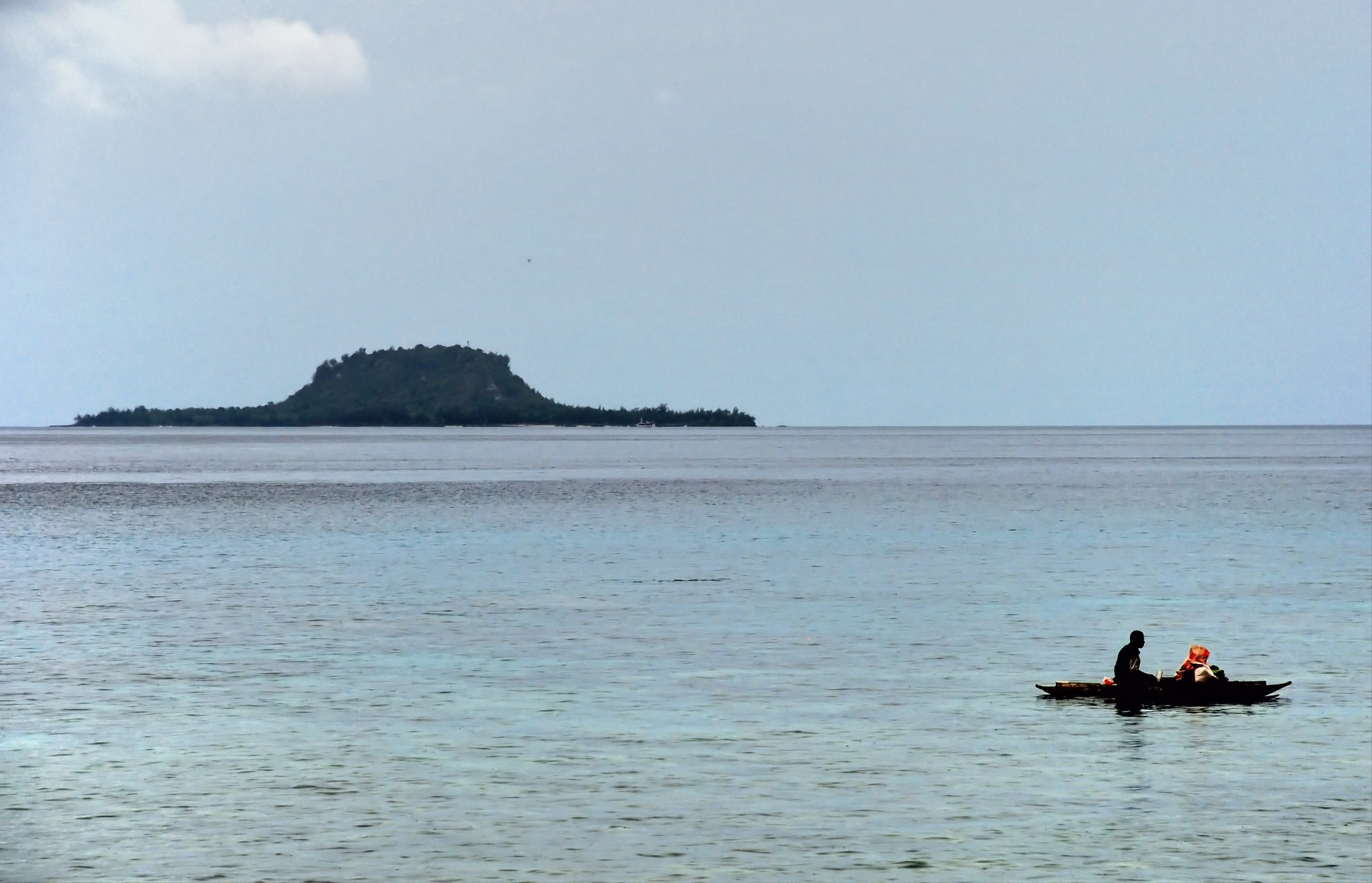
Eretoka (3 km (2 mi) west)

Around Efate lie many small islands, among them are Eretoka (Hat) Island, Lelepa, Nguna, Pele, Ekapum Lep, Erueti Lep, Ekapum Rik, Iriwiti Lep, Hideaway Island, Ifira Island, and Emao.

Eretoka Island is a small island that, when seen from a distance looks like a floppy hat. This is where the famous Chief Roi Mata, along with his 20 wives and many other servants, were buried. Nguna, Pele and Emao are stratovolcanoes, which may form the rim of a volcanic caldera to their north.

== Demographics ==
Efate is the most populous island in Vanuatu, with 50,340 persons, representing 17 per cent of the national population, as recorded in the 2020 census. Most inhabitants of Efate live in Port Vila, the national capital.

There are roughly half a dozen languages spoken on Efate, including Central Vanuatu languages such as Nakanamanga (Nguna, North Efate), Namakura (Makura, Namakir), Nafsan (Erakor, South Efate), Lelepa (Havannah Harbour), and Eton, as well as the Polynesian outlier language Mele-Fila. The North Efate and South Efate languages are not very closely related, and when missionaries became active on the island, they encouraged the use of a zonal auxiliary language, Efatese, based on various languages of Efate.

== Governance ==
Efate is governed by both the Port Vila Municipality and the Shefa Provincial Council, whose governance is the town limits of Port Vila only, and rural Efate and the outer Efate Islands, respectively.

The island outside of Port Vila is represented in Parliament by the five-seat riding of Efate. Port Vila has its own five-seat riding. These ten MPs are elected through Single non-transferable voting.

== Economy and tourism ==
The economy of Vanuatu is largely dependent on subsistence agriculture and tourism. Since the 2010s, planting of coconut plantations and the production of coconut products has increased, after falling into neglect in the 1980s.

The capital of Port Vila is the hub of tourism in Vanuatu, receiving tourists by air, cruise ships, and the yachts. Due to the British and French influence, both cuisines are readily available in the capital. There are also Chinese eateries across Vila and the Mummas Market downtown. Outside of Port Vila, most people live a traditional lifestyle, cooking island food or aelan kakae, and swimming at the beach.

The Mele Cascades and the quieter Lololima Falls and rock pools are popular recreation areas for tourists. Other attractions include Eton Beach and the Tanalilui Road Markets.

Port Vila services the domestic carrier Air Vanuatu which goes to the outer islands of Vanuatu. Popular destinations such as Tanna and Santo can be reached daily from Port Vila, while more remote locations can be reached on a less regular basis. The island is served by Bauerfield International Airport.

== In popular culture ==
Efate was used as the location for three seasons of the reality game show, Survivor. The island was used for season 9 of the American edition of Survivor (titled Survivor: Vanuatu - Islands of Fire), season 2 of Australian Survivor (titled Australian Celebrity Survivor: Vanuatu) and season 6 of the French edition (titled Koh-Lanta: Vanuatu).

Much of the Survivor: Vanuatu and Australian Celebrity Survivor was filmed approximately 30 minutes from Port Vila near Mangililu and Gideon's Landing, the latter of which is now a commonly visited tourist attraction.
