= Ulei Airport =

Airport in Vanuatu

- IATA: ULB; ICAO: NVSU

Summary
- Airport type: Public
- Serves: Ulei, Ambryn, Vanuatu
- Coordinates: 16°20′S 168°17′E

Map
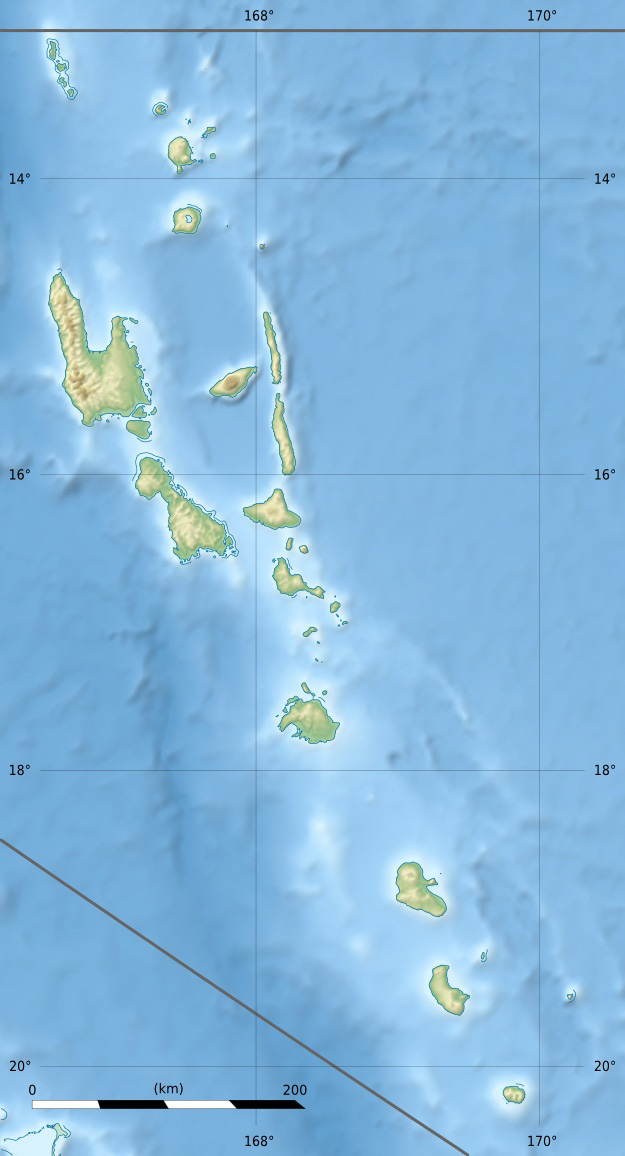
- Location of airport in Vanuatu

Ulei Airport is an airport in Ulei, Ambrym, Vanuatu (IATA: ULB, ICAO: NVSU).
