= Daakaka language =

Austronesian language spoken in Vanuatu

Daakaka
- Native to: Vanuatu
- Region: Ambrym
- Native speakers: 1,000 (2012)
- Language family: Austronesian: Malayo-Polynesian; Oceanic; Southern Oceanic; North-Central Vanuatu; Central Vanuatu; Daakaka

Language codes
- ISO 639-3: bpa
- Glottolog: daka1243
- Area where Daakaka is spoken on Ambrym

- Daakaka is not endangered according to the classification system of the UNESCO Atlas of the World's Languages in Danger

Daakaka [ⁿdaːkaka] (also known as Dakaka, South Ambrym and Baiap) is a native language of Ambrym, Vanuatu. It is spoken by about one thousand speakers in the south-western corner of the island.

== Vitality ==
Most children in the region still acquire Daakaka as a first language, but it is under threat by significant socio-economic changes and the dominant use of Vanuatu's official languages, Bislama, English and French, in education and in official contexts.

== Phonology ==
=== Consonants ===
The system of consonantal phonemes is fairly typical for the region. Voiced stops are prenasalized. The difference between bilabial consonants with and without a labio-velar release is relevant only before front vowels.

		Labio-velar	Labial	Alveolar	Palatal	Velar
Nasal		mʷ	m	n		ŋ
Stop	voiceless	pʷ	p	t		k
Stop	prenasalized	ᵐbʷ	ᵐb	ⁿd		ᵑɡ
Fricative			v	s		
Trill				r		
Approximant		w			j	

=== Vowels ===
There are seven phonemically distinct vowel qualities, with one long and one short vowel phoneme for each variety, plus a marginally phonemic ə [ə]. The distinction between mid and open-mid vowels is only phonemic after alveolar consonants, as in tee [tɛː] "axe" vs. téé [teː] "see".

	Front	Central	Back
Close	i, iː		u, uː
Mid	e, eː	(ə)	o, oː
Open-mid	ɛ, ɛː		ɔ, ɔː
Open		a, aː	

== Word classes ==
The four major word classes are nouns, verbs, adjectives and adverbs. Only nouns can stand in argument position, only verbs and some adjectives can be used as predicates without the copula i, only adjectives can be used as attributes to nouns without further modification. The two biggest word classes by far are nouns and verbs.

=== Nouns ===
There are three subclasses of nouns. The biggest subclass consists of 'general nouns' such as em "house" or myaop "volcano"; in contrast to the other two classes, these nouns do not need to specify a possessor, they cannot be inflected and they cannot be directly followed by another noun phrase. 'Inflected nouns' always indicate their possessor by a person-number ending:

kus-uk
nose.of-1S.POSS
"my nose"

Transitive or relational nouns also obligatorily specify an inalienable possessor, but this possessor is given by a subsequent noun phrase, not by an inflectional ending. Known, definite, non-human possessors can also be indicated by the suffix -sye or its allomorph -tye:

bwee tuwu
shell.of bush.nut
"the shell of the bush nut"

bwee-tye
shell.of-3S(n-hum).POSS
"its shell"

=== Verbs ===
Among verbs, there are several subgroups which differ either in terms of transitivity or in terms of the number of their internal argument (the subject of an intransitive verb or the object of a transitive verb).

==== Transitivity ====
There are three degrees of transitivity: verbs can be either intransitive, semitransitive or transitive. Intransitive verbs such as oko "walk" never take an object noun phrase. Semitransitive verbs can optionally be followed by an object noun phrase with indefinite reference; by contrast, transitive verbs are always interpreted to have a definite object.

Semitransitive en "eat":	Transitive ane "eat":
ya=m du en 3P=REAL PROG eat(SEMTR) "they are eating"	ya=m du ane 3P=REAL PROG eat(TR) "they are eating it"
ya=m du en mesyu 3P=REAL PROG eat(SEMTR) fish "they are eating fish"	ya=m du ane mesyu 3P=REAL PROG eat(TR) fish "they are eating the fish"

==== Pluractionality ====
While most verbs are neutral with regard to the number of their arguments, some verbs can take only singular arguments and some (pluractional) verbs can only take non-singular arguments. For example, mur, tesi and medap all mean "fall down", but only medap can have either a singular or a plural subject. By contrast, mur can only take a singular subject, while the subject of tesi always refers to more than one entity (starred examples, in red cells, are ungrammatical):

Singular	Pluractional	Number-neutral
ó swa mu mur coconut one REAL fall(SG) "one coconut fell down"	{* ó} swa ma tesi coconut one REAL fall(N-SG) intend.:"one coconut fell down"	ó swa ma medap coconut one REAL fall "one coconut fell down"
{* ó} mwe pwis mu mur coconut REAL be.many REAL fall(SG) intend.:"many coconuts fell down"	ó mwe pwis ma tesi coconut REAL be.many REAL fall(N-SG) "many coconuts fell down"	ó mwe pwis ma medap coconut REAL be.many REAL fall "many coconuts fell down"

== Clauses ==
=== Basic clause structure ===
A simple assertive clause always contains a subject pronoun, a TAM marker and a predicate - except for third person singular subjects, for which there is no subject pronoun. Predicates can consist of a verb, an adjective or a copula plus noun phrase (NP) or adverbial phrase.

Third person pronouns may be preceded by a subject NP. A few examples are given below:

Subject pronoun + TAM + VP

na=m kueli me
1S= return come
"I have returned"

Subject NP + TAM + Adjective

sini ma kekei
{green pigeon} REAL small
"the green pigeon is small"

Subject NP + TAM + Copula + NP

s-ok naana mw=i tyotyo
CL3-1S.POSS mother REAL=COP snake
"my mother is a snake"

=== Personal Pronouns ===
There are two kinds of personal pronouns, subject pronouns and non-subject pronouns. Subject pronouns end in a vowel and are followed directly by a TAM marker. They are obligatory in assertive clauses. Non-subject pronouns are used as topics or objects of verbs or prepositions. Each pronoun represents a combination of a person and a number value. There are four person values: first person inclusive (including both the speaker and the listener), first person exclusive (including only the speaker, not the listener), second person (including the listener) and third person (including neither speaker nor listener). The four number values are singular (one person), dual (two persons), paucal (few persons) and plural (an arbitrarily large number of persons).

Subject pronouns
		Singular	Dual	Paucal	Plural
1st person	exclusive	na	kana	kisi	kinye
1st person	inclusive	na	da	si	ra
2nd person		ko	ka	kasi	ki
3rd person		∅	ya	ye	ye

Non-subject pronouns
		Singular	Dual	Paucal	Plural
1st person	exclusive	nye	kenma	kinyemsi	kinyem
1st person	inclusive	nye	ada	ansi	ar/er
2nd person		ngok	kama	kamsi	kimim
3rd person		nge	nyoo	nya	nyosi

== Bibliography ==
- von Prince, Kilu (January 2015). A Grammar of Daakaka. De Gruyter Mouton. ISBN 978-3-11-034259-8.
