= Epi (island) =

Island in Shefa Province, Vanuatu

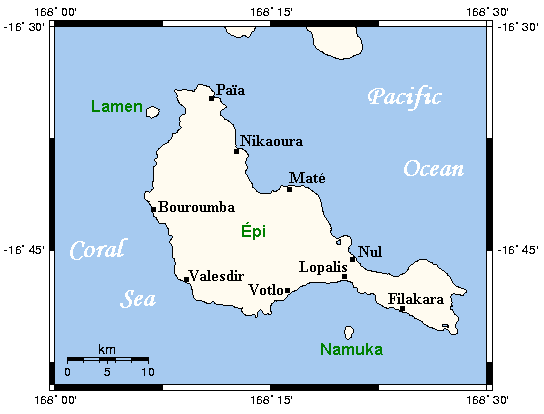
- Map of Epi

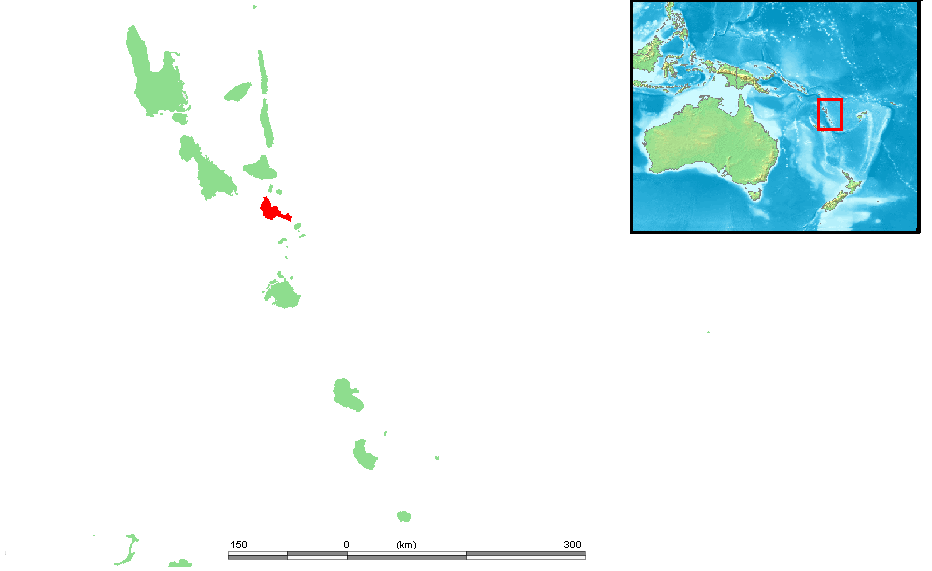

Geography
- Location: Pacific Ocean
- Coordinates: 16.89°S 168.30°E
- Archipelago: Vanuatu
- Area: 444 km^{2} (171 sq mi)
- Highest elevation: 833 m (2733 ft)
- Highest point: Mount Pomare

Administration
- Vanuatu
- Province: Shefa Province

Demographics
- Population: 5,207 (2009)
- Pop. density: 6.84/km^{2} (17.72/sq mi)

Epi (or Épi, Api; formerly known as Tasiko or Volcano Island) is an island in Shefa Province, Vanuatu, at the north end of the Shepherd Islands.

The island is 43 kilometres (27 mi) long northwest–southeast, and 18 kilometres (11 mi) wide, with an area of 444 square kilometres (171 sq mi). Its shoreline measures 130 km. In 1986 it had a population of 3,035 but in 2009 it had increased to 5,200.

== Geology and Geography ==
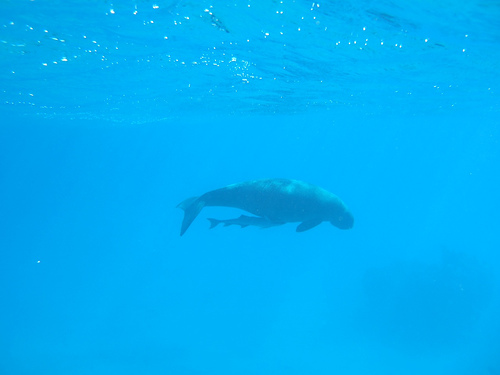
Dugong with attached remora, Lamen Island, Epi, Vanuatu.

The island is of volcanic origin, and its highest point, Mount Pomare, which reaches a height of 833 m above sea level, is a quaternary volcano. It lies 13 km from the more prominent Lopévi volcano. To the east is the largely underwater East Epi volcano. The neighboring islets are Tefala, Namuka, and Lamen.

On the northwest edge of the island is the sandy beach Lamen Bay, and the nearby small island of Lamen (pop. 500). The bay has some coral reefs which are the habitat of the dugong. On the west coast is Cape Forland. In the southeast is Valesdir. In the northeast is Drummond Bay, with the Nikaura Marine Protected Area, established in 2000 by the community of Nikaura. There are also black (volcanic) sand beaches, and three small freshwater lakes.

== History ==
Epi suffered depopulation during the nineteenth century on a scale that was more massive than in many other parts of Vanuatu. There is evidence that the island was considerably more diverse linguistically than it is today. The population of the interior was relocated to coastal villages after mission contact.

== Culture ==
Epi has a wide variety of languages for its size, including: Bieria in the south, Maii in the southwest, Baki in the west, Bierebo in the northwest, Lamenu at the northwest tip (and also the island of Lamen), and Lewo in the east. These languages are all spoken by a few to several hundred speakers each, and form a branch of the Austronesian languages of Vanuatu.

Epi High School, at Lamen Bay, is being renovated by a joint effort from Kiwanis, Air Vanuatu, and AusAID.

There is a Presbyterian hospital at Vaémali (Falmali), on the north end of the island.

== Economy ==
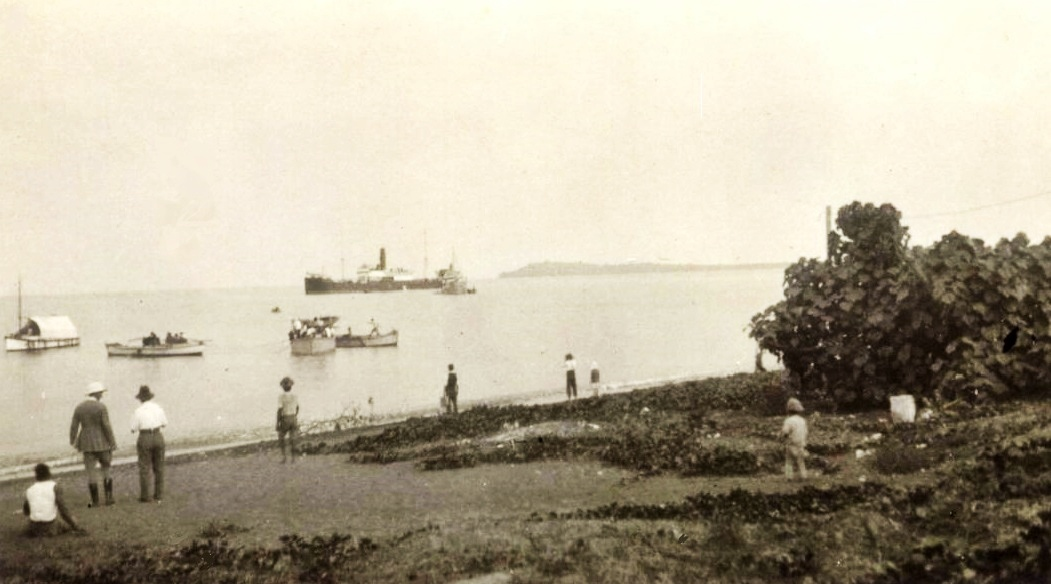
Cargo ship loading copra off Epi (early 1930s)

The principal economic activity is subsistence agriculture. The island's GDP is $457 per capita.

Formerly there were a number of large plantations for coconuts and copra, principally along the fertile coasts. Today most of these have been broken into small holdings, except for the large plantation at Valesdir, which continues to produce copra, beef, and kava. Other crops include peanuts (grown in the interior hills) and kava.

Fishing is important as well. The government has recently been promoting training in fishing to improve its efficiency and safety.

Tourism has become more important, especially in the Lamen Bay area and Valesdir. There is accommodation available in a few other places including Sara and Nikaura.

Since 2007 with the introduction of the Recognised Seasonal Employer (RSE) Scheme in New Zealand, in which New Zealand horticultural businesses can source seasonal labour from several Pacific Islands including Vanuatu, a small number of New Zealand businesses have sourced their RSE labour from Epi, primarily from the Lamen Bay area. Each year between 50 and 80 workers are recruited. These workers spend up to seven months of the year in New Zealand working as seasonal labourers in the horticultural industry; returning at the end of the period with their savings. A worker on the scheme could be anticipated to save approximately 450 000 Vatu over the seven-month work period. This has provided a substantial cash injection to the local economy and improved the living conditions of many of the residents and their families.

== Transport ==
There are two airports on the island, one in the northwest, Lamen Bay Airport, and one in the southwest at Valesdir. Both are serviced a five times a week by Belair and Air Vanuatu. The island can also be reached by ship.

The island has basic unsealed roads but few vehicles.
