= Ambrym =

Volcanic island in Vanuatu

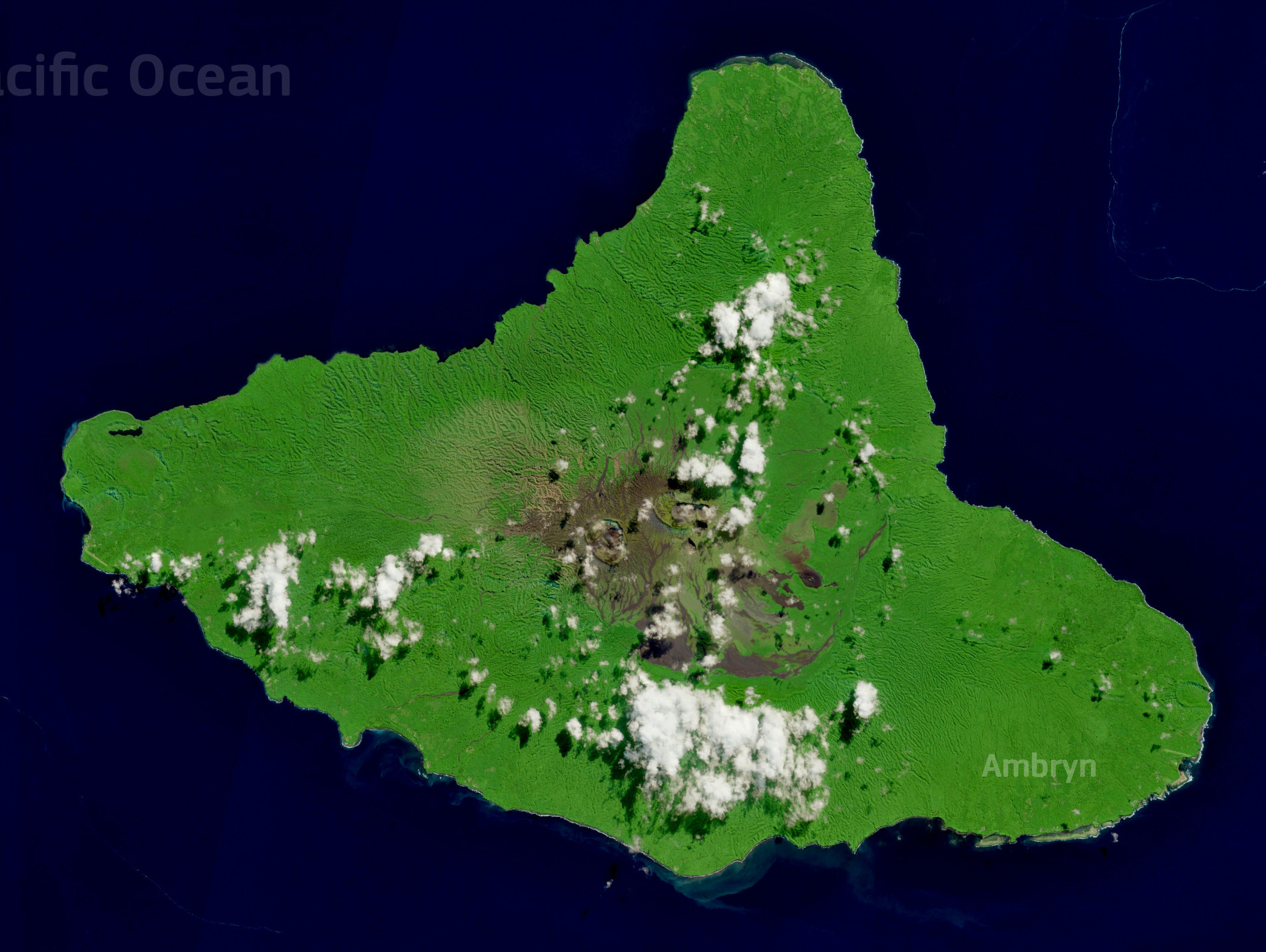

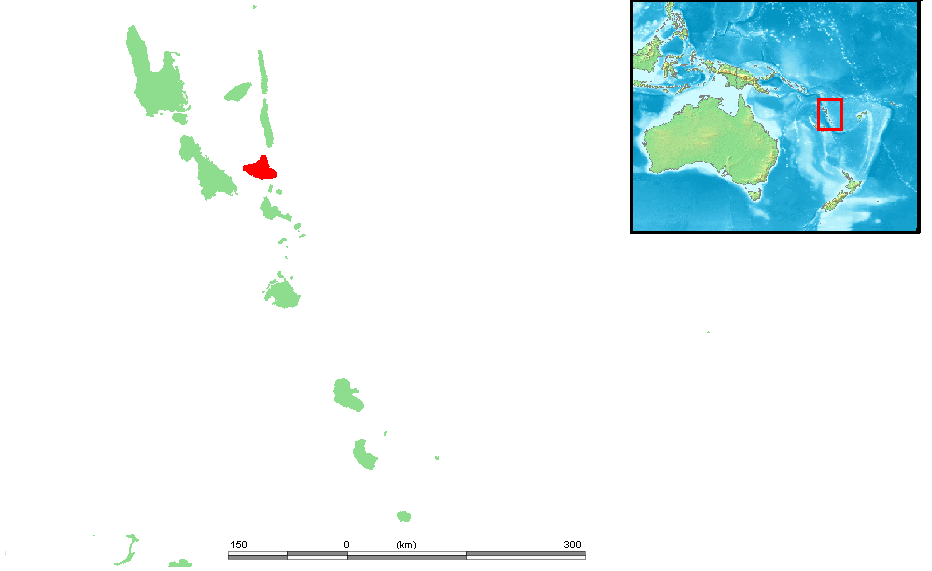
- Map of Ambrym

Geography
- Location: Pacific Ocean
- Coordinates: 16°15′S 168°7′E
- Archipelago: New Hebrides
- Area: 677.7 km^{2} (261.7 sq mi)
- Highest elevation: 1,334 m (4377 ft)

Administration
- Vanuatu
- Province: Malampa

Demographics
- Population: 7,275 (2009)
- Ethnic groups: Ni-Vanuatu

Ambrym
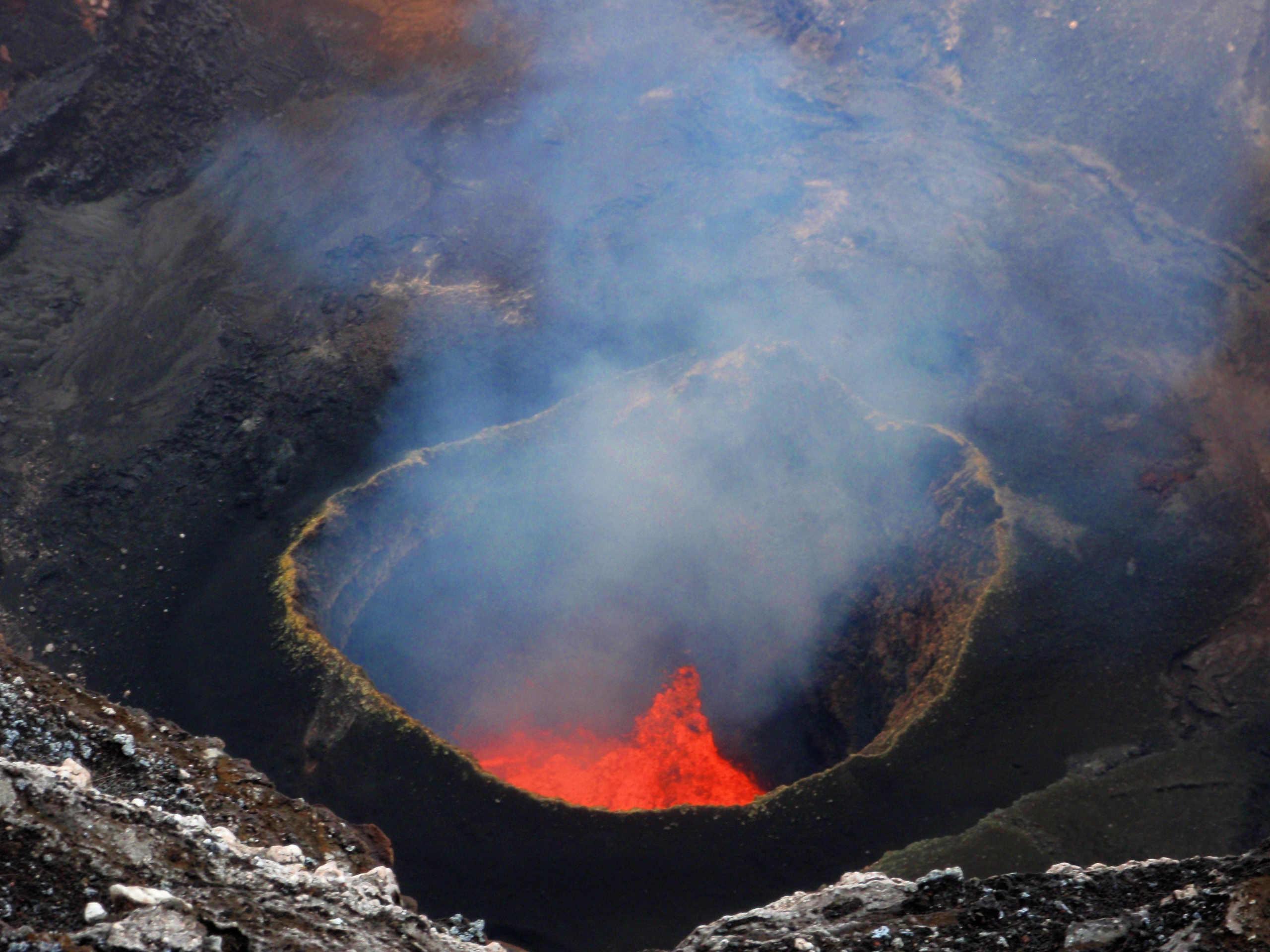
- Lava lake in Marum crater, Ambrym, in a photo taken 24 September 2009

Highest point
- Peak: Ambrym Volcano summit
- Elevation: 1,334 m (4,377 ft)
- Listing: Volcanoes of Vanuatu
- Coordinates: 16°15′S 168°7′E

Geography
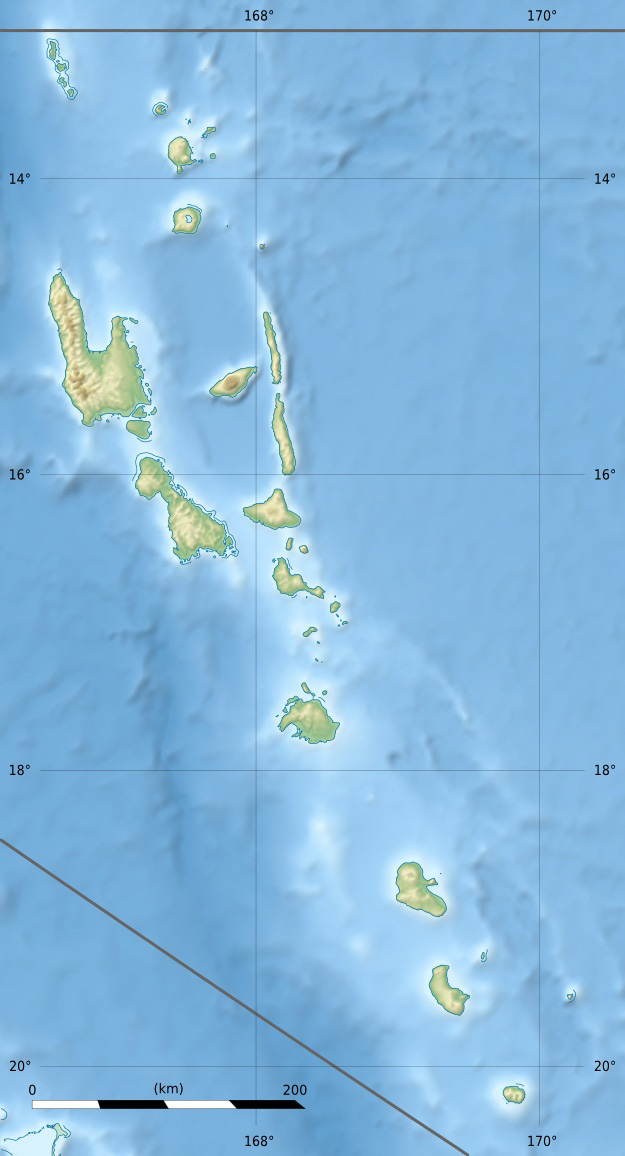
- Location within Vanuatu
- Location: Vanuatu

Geology
- Mountain type: Pyroclastic shield
- Volcanic arc: New Hebrides arc
- Last eruption: 2022

Ambrym is a volcanic island in Malampa Province in the archipelago of Vanuatu. It is located near the center of the archipelago of Vanuatu, and also hosts one of the most active volcanoes in the world, which includes lava lakes in two craters near the summit. It is currently the least populous island in the country.

== Etymology ==
Ambrym (also known as Ambrin, "ham rim" in the Ranon language) was allegedly named by Captain Cook, who is said to have anchored off there in 1774. In fact, his expedition never touched Ambrym.

== Geography ==
Located near the center of the Vanuatu archipelago, Ambrym is roughly triangular in shape, about 50 km (31 mi) wide. With 677.7 square kilometres (261.7 mi^{2}) of surface area, it is the fifth largest island in the country. The summit at the centre of the island is dominated by a desert-like caldera, which covers an area of 100 square kilometres (39 mi^{2}). With the exception of human settlements, the rest of the island is covered by a dense jungle.

=== Important Bird Area ===
The western part of the island, comprising 17,605 ha of forest, together with gardens around habitation, has been recognised as an Important Bird Area (IBA) by BirdLife International because it supports populations of Vanuatu megapodes, Tanna fruit doves, red-bellied fruit doves, grey-eared honeyeaters, cardinal myzomelas, fan-tailed gerygones, long-tailed trillers, streaked fantails, Melanesian flycatchers, buff-bellied monarchs and Vanuatu white-eyes.

== Volcanology ==
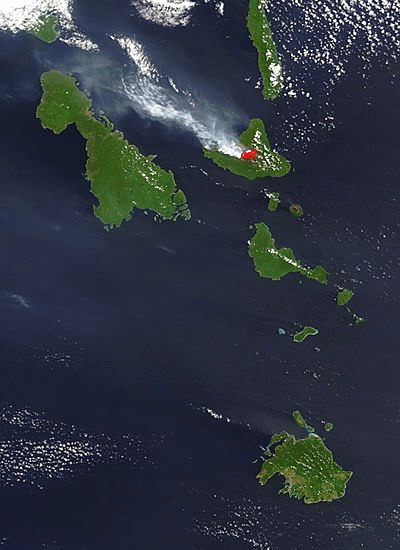
Ash plume from Ambrym Volcano, October 4, 2004

Ambrym is a large basaltic volcano with a 12-km-wide caldera, and is one of the most active volcanoes of the New Hebrides volcanic arc. The caldera is the result of a huge Plinian eruption, which took place around AD 50. Its explosive force is rated 6, the third highest in the Smithsonian Institution's Volcanic Explosivity Index ranks of the largest volcanic explosions in recent geological history.

While at higher elevations cinder cones predominate, the western tip of the island is characterized by a series of basaltic tuff rings, of which the largest is about 1 kilometre (0.62 mi) in diameter. These were produced by phreatic eruptions when magma contacted the water table and water-saturated sediments along the coast. The massive, 1900-year-old, 12 kilometres (7.5 mi) × 8 kilometres (5.0 mi) caldera is the site of two active volcanic cones, Benbow and Marum (also spelled Maroum). Mount Benbow was named after English Admiral John Benbow (1653–1702) by Captain Cook.

Several times a century, Ambrym volcano has destructive eruptions. Mount Benbow last erupted explosively in 1913, destroying the mission hospital at Dip Point. Volcanic gas emissions from this volcano are measured by a Multi-Component Gas Analyzer System, which detects pre-eruptive degassing of rising magmas, improving prediction of volcanic activity.

In March 2017, Google added Marum crater with its lava lakes to Google Streetview. Since the last fissure eruption on 16 Dec 2018, the lava lake has disappeared.

== Demographics ==
With the neighbouring island of Malakula and a few smaller islands, Ambrym forms Malampa Province. The population of 7,275 inhabitants lives mainly off coconut plantations in the three corners of the island.

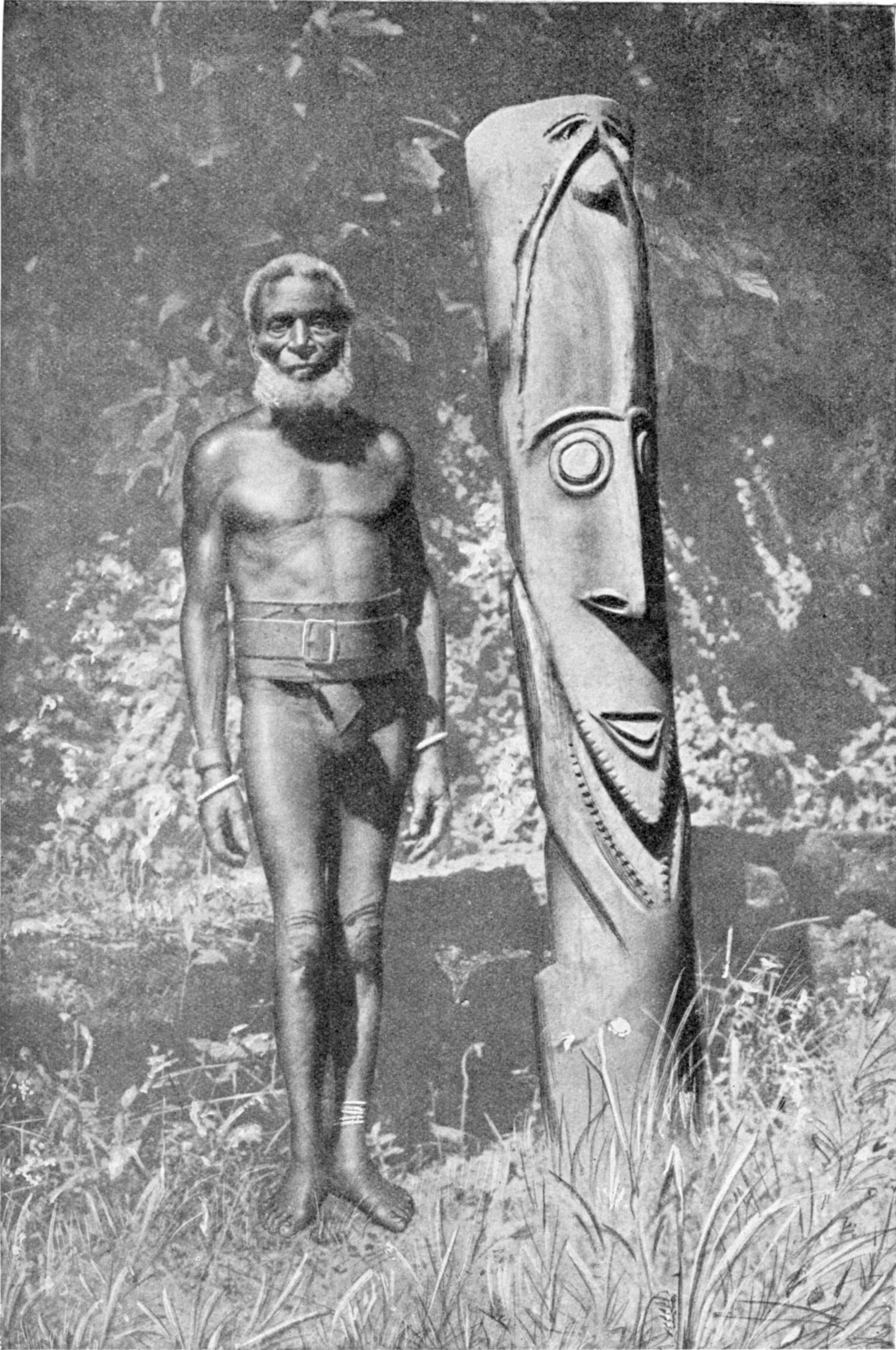
An Ambrym woodcarver, circa 1925

== Languages ==
Like many islands in Vanuatu, Ambrym has its own Austronesian languages.

In the north:

- Fanbyak
- North Ambrym language

In the southeast:

- Vatlongos (Southeast Ambrym language)

In the southwest:

- Daakie
- Daakaka
- Dalkalaen
- Lonwolwol
- Raljago

== Towns and villages ==
=== Southwest ===
- Fali, Craig Cove, Baiap, Sesivi, Port Vato, Bwele, Lalinda, Tow, Yaotilie, Sanesup, Emiotungan, Maranata and Pelibetakever

=== Southeast ===
- Maat, Paamal, Toak, Uléi, Utas, Tavéak, Asé, Pawé, Saméo, Endu, Pahakol and Benebo

=== North ===
- Ranuetlam, Ranon, Olal, Fanla, Linboul, Wilit, Lonwara, Fona, Nebul and Megham

== Tourism ==
Tourists are attracted by Ambrym's active volcanoes, tropical vegetation, and the customs of the local villagers. They stay in traditional bungalows, as there are no hotels on the island.

== Transportation ==
The island is served by two airports, Ulei Airport in the southeast and Craig Cove Airport in the southwest.

== Popular culture ==
Ambrym is featured in the 2016 Werner Herzog documentary, Into the Inferno.

Episode two of the BBC documentary "Into the Volcano" hosted by Kate Humble was filmed on Ambrym in 2014.

In 2015, Sam Cossman led an expedition that made multiple rope descents into the Marum crater, capturing drone and GoPro footage of the lava lake and producing a 3D model of the crater.
