= Southern Oceanic languages =

Subgroup of the Oceanic branch of the Austronesian language family

Southern Oceanic
- Geographic distribution: Vanuatu, New Caledonia
- Linguistic classification: Austronesian: Malayo-Polynesian; Oceanic; Central–Eastern; Southern Oceanic
- Proto-language: Proto-Southern Oceanic
- Subdivisions: North-Central Vanuatu; South Vanuatu; New Caledonian

Language codes
- Glottolog: None
- Southern Oceanic

The Southern Oceanic languages are a linkage (rather than family) of Oceanic languages spoken in Vanuatu and New Caledonia. It was proposed by John Lynch in 1995 and supported by later studies. It appears to be a linkage rather than a language family with a clearly defined internal nested structure.

== Classification ==
Clark (2009) groups the North Vanuatu and Central Vanuatu languages together into a North-Central Vanuatu (NCV) group and also reconstructs Proto-North-Central Vanuatu, but this is not accepted by Lynch (2018).

In addition to the Temotu languages and the Northwest Solomonic languages of the western Solomon Islands, Geraghty (2017) notes that many Southern Oceanic languages are often lexically and typologically aberrant, likely with Papuan substrata - particularly the Espiritu Santo, Malakula, South Vanuatu, and New Caledonian languages, and perhaps also some Central Vanuatu languages of Ambrym and Efate. Nevertheless, languages in the eastern Solomon Islands, including Guadalcanal, Malaita, Makira, and a scattering of North Vanuatu languages including Mota, Raga, and Tamambo, are much more conservative.

== Languages ==
Following Clark (2009) and Glottolog 4.0, three major groups can be delineated, which are North-Central Vanuatu, South Vanuatu, and New Caledonian. The first group is a linkage, while the others form genetic subgroups.

- North-Central Vanuatu
- South Vanuatu
- New Caledonian

=== Lynch (1995) ===
Lynch (1995) tentatively grouped the languages as follows:

- Banks–Torres family
- Northwest Santo family
- Southwest Santo family
- Sakao
- East Santo family
- Ambae–Maewo family
- Nuclear Southern Oceanic linkage
  - Central Vanuatu linkage
    - Malekula Coastal
    - Malekula Interior
    - Pentecost
    - Ambrym–Paama
  - Epi–Efate
    - Epi
    - Shepherds–North Efate
  - South Efate – Southern Melanesian linkage
    - South Efate dialect network
    - Southern Melanesian family
      - Southern Vanuatu family
      - New Caledonian family

The non-nuclear branches are subsumed under Northern Vanuatu.

=== Ross, Pawley, & Osmond (2016) ===
Ross, Pawley, & Osmond (2016) propose the following internal classification for Southern Oceanic.

- Southern Oceanic linkage
  - North Vanuatu linkage
  - Nuclear Southern Oceanic linkage
    - Central Vanuatu linkage
    - South Vanuatu languages
    - Loyalties-New Caledonia languages

== See also ==
- Languages of Vanuatu

== Notes and references ==
=== Bibliography ===
- Clark, Ross (2009). Leo Tuai: A comparative lexical study of North and Central Vanuatu languages. Canberra: Pacific Linguistics. doi:10.15144/PL-603. ISSN 1448-8310.
- François, Alexandre; Franjieh, Michael; Lacrampe, Sébastien; Schnell, Stefan (2015), "The exceptional linguistic density of Vanuatu", in François, Alexandre; Lacrampe, Sébastien; Franjieh, Michael; Schnell, Stefan (eds.), The Languages of Vanuatu: Unity and Diversity, Studies in the Languages of Island Melanesia, Canberra: Asia Pacific Linguistics Open Access, pp. 1–21, ISBN 9781922185235, archived from the original (PDF) on 25 August 2015.
- Lynch, John, and Terry Crowley. 2001. Languages of Vanuatu: A New Survey and Bibliography. (Pacific Linguistics, 517.) Canberra: Research School of Pacific and Asian Studies, Australian National University.
- Lynch, John, Malcolm Ross & Terry Crowley. 2002. The Oceanic Languages. Richmond, Surrey: Curzon Press.
