= Terry Crowley (linguist) =

English-Australian linguist (1953–2005)

- Crowley in May 2004
- Born: Terence Michael Crowley; 1 April 1953; Billericay, Essex, United Kingdom
- Died: 15 January 2005 (aged 51)
- Occupation: Linguist

Academic work
- Main interests: Oceanic languages and Bislama

Terence Michael Crowley (1 April 1953 – 15 January 2005) was an English-Australian linguist specializing in Oceanic languages as well as Bislama, the English-lexified creole recognized as a national language in Vanuatu. From 1991 he taught in New Zealand. Previously, he was with the Pacific Languages Unit of the University of the South Pacific in Vanuatu (1983–90) and with the Department of Language and Literature at the University of Papua New Guinea (1979–83).

== Life and career ==
Crowley was born in Billericay, Essex in 1953. His English parents emigrated to Australia when he was roughly 7 years old, and the family settled on a dairy farm in the rural north of Victoria, just outside Shepparton, where Crowley received his early education. His parents raised him in the outback. He decided to become a philologist early, during his high school years at Shepparton High School, from which he graduated as dux in 1970.

Crowley had already made inquiries as a fifteen-year old in 1968 by addressing a personal letter to Stephen Wurm asking if there were employment opportunities for people who took up languages. Donald Laycock answered, since Wurm was away at the time, and encouraged him to pursue linguistics by enclosing a copy of his own work on Sepik languages. (Note: The work in question was, Donald Laycock, The Ndu language family.(Sepik District, New Guinea), Australian National University, 1965) Crowley enrolled at the Australian National University in 1971 with an Asian studies scholarship, with a major in Indonesian, while also taking coursework on Aboriginal languages under Robert Dixon.

Crowley's precocity was already in evidence in his third year, when he produced a paper on the Nganyaywana language once spoken by the Anēwan of New England, in which, in the words of Nicholas Evans, Crowley made a brilliant demonstration of the fact that the Anewan language, far from being a language isolate as long thought, could be correlated with Pama-Nyungan once initial consonant loss was taken into account. He went on to graduate with first class honours, winning a University medal in linguistics, with an honours thesis on the dialects of Bundjalang.

Given diplomatic tensions between Australia and Indonesia at the time, Crowley did his post-graduate thesis work on Vanuatu, where 195,000 to 200,000 people speak approximately 100 distinct languages. (Note: 'Vanuatu is the world's most diverse nation in terms of the number of languages per head of population.') He obtained a doctorate in 1980 with a dissertation on Paamese, managing in the meantime to do linguistic salvage fieldwork describing several moribund Australian languages such as Djangadi, Gumbaynggir and Yaygir in New South Wales, and the Mpakwithi dialect of Anguthimri, together with Uradhi, both formerly spoken in the Cape York Peninsula.

Crowley was appointed lecturer at the University of Papua New Guinea where he worked (1979-1983) under John Lynch, who subsequently recommended him to Ron Crocombe when the latter's Institute of Pacific Studies decided to set up a Pacific Languages Unit (PLU) at Port Vila in Vanuatu in 1983, which Crowley directed until 1990.

In 1991 he relocated to Hamilton in New Zealand where he taught at University of Waikato, rising to a full professorship in 2003. Over the following decades, he wrote salvage descriptions of several Malakula languages, including Tape, and others, ranging from coastal Nāti, to the interior Malakula languages of Avava, Nese (spoken by a single family) and Naman, as well as documenting Sye on the island of Erromango and Gela on the Solomon Islands.

He died from a sudden, severe heart attack. Crowley took care to maintain a healthy lifestyle, which makes his death at the age of 51 all the more unexpected.

== Legacy ==
At the time of his death Crowley was working on writing grammars and dictionaries of 18 languages. In a book published posthumously, Crowley wrote of the urgency of doing dirty-boots linguistic fieldwork, with the ethical imperative of enabling thousands of cultures at risk of extinction to have their linguistic patrimony recorded, so that their descendants might thereby avoid the tragic consequences of the loss of Tasmanian languages. Almost nothing of structural value was transmitted in written archives by the time of Truganini's death, a fact which deprives all Palawa of Aboriginal descent of both their cultural identity and the land claims which can only be pursued if continuity can be proven. Crowley perceived his salvage campaign among far-flung languages in this light, as securing for future generations a heritage that would otherwise be lost, to their detriment.

== Selected works ==
=== Books ===
- 1982. The Paamese language of Vanuatu. Canberra: Pacific Linguistics.
- 1984. Tunuen telamun tenout Voum. Port Vila: USP Centre. (with Joshua Mael)
- 1985. Language development in Melanesia. Suva: Pacific Languages Unit, University of the South Pacific; and Department of Language and Literature, University of Papua New Guinea. (with John Lynch)
- 1985. An introductory linguistics workbook. Port Moresby: Department of Language and Literature, University of Papua New Guinea. (with John Lynch)
- 1987. An introduction to historical linguistics. Port Moresby and Suva: University of Papua New Guinea Press, and Institute of Pacific Studies, University of the South Pacific.
- 1987. Grama blong Bislama. Suva: Extension Services, University of the South Pacific.
- 1990. Kindabuk. Port Vila: University of the South Pacific. (with Claudia Brown)
- 1990. Beach-la-Mar to Bislama: The emergence of a national language in Vanuatu. Oxford Studies in Language Contact. Oxford: Clarendon Press.
- 1992. A dictionary of Paamese. Canberra: Pacific Linguistics.
- 1992. An introduction to historical linguistics, 2d ed. Auckland: Oxford University Press.
- 1995. A new Bislama dictionary. Suva: Institute of Pacific Studies and Pacific Languages Unit (University of the South Pacific).
- 1995. The design of language: An introduction to descriptive linguistics. Auckland: Longman Paul. (with John Lynch, Jeff Siegel, and Julie Piau)
- 1997. An introduction to historical linguistics, 3d ed. Melbourne: Oxford University Press.
- 1997. Navyan ovoteme Nelocompne ire (The voice of Erromangans today). Hamilton, New Zealand: Vanuatu Cultural Centre and Department of General and Applied Linguistics, University of Waikato.
- 1998. An Erromangan (Sye) grammar. Oceanic Linguistics Special Publication No. 27. Honolulu: University of Hawaiʻi Press.
- 1998. Ura. Languages of the World/Materials 240. München: LINCOM EUROPA.
- 1999. Ura: A disappearing language of Southern Vanuatu. Canberra: Pacific Linguistics.
- 2000. An Erromangan (Sye) dictionary. Canberra: Pacific Linguistics.
- 2000. Literacy and translation in a Vanuatu language. Languages of the World 13. München: LINCOM EUROPA.
- 2001. Te Reo 44: Studies in creole linguistics in memory of Chris Corne, 1942-1999. (with Jeff Siegel)
- 2001. Languages of Vanuatu: A new survey and bibliography. Canberra: Pacific Linguistics. (with John Lynch)
- 2002. Serial verbs in Oceanic: A descriptive typology. Oxford: Oxford University Press.
- 2003. A new Bislama dictionary, 2d ed. Suva: Institute of Pacific Studies, University of the South Pacific.
- 2004. Bislama reference grammar. Oceanic Linguistics Special Publication No. 31. Honolulu: University of Hawaiʻi Press.

== Sources ==
- Austin, Peter (2 February 2005). "Obituary for Professor Terry Crowley". Linguistlist.org.
- Crowley, Terry (1976). "Phonological change in New England". In Dixon, R. M. W. (ed.). Grammatical categories in Australian languages. Australian Institute of Aboriginal Studies. pp. 19–50. ISBN 978-0-855-75055-8.
- Crowley, Terry (1981). "The Mpakwithi dialect of Anguthimri". In Dixon, Robert M. W.; Blake, Barry J. (eds.). Handbook of Australian Languages, Volume 2. John Benjamins Publishing. pp. 171–220. ISBN 978-9-027-27354-3.
- Crowley, Terry (1992). "Don Layton". In Dutton, Thomas Edward; Ross, Malcolm; Tryon, Darrell T. (eds.). The Language game: papers in honour of Donald C. Laycock. Pacific Linguistics. Vol. 110. Linguistics Department, Research School of Pacific Studies. pp. 20–21. ISBN 9780858834002.
- Crowley, Terry (2007). Thieberger, Nicholas (ed.). Field Linguistics: A Beginner's Guide. Oxford University Press. ISBN 978-0-191-53636-6.
- Evans, Nicholas (2005). "Listening to the Pacific: In remembrance of Terry Crowley". Linguistic Typology. 9. Walter de Gruyter: 157–163. doi:10.1515/lity.2005.9.1.157. hdl:1885/31091. S2CID 121944076.
- François, Alexandre (2007). "Review: Four grammars of Malakula languages by Terry Crowley". Bijdragen tot de Taal-, Land- en Volkenkunde. 163 (2–3). Brill: 430–439. JSTOR 27868407.
- Lynch, John (June 2005). "In Memoriam, Terry Crowley 1953-2005". Oceanic Linguistics. 44 (1). University of Hawai'i Press: 223–241. doi:10.1353/ol.2005.0022. JSTOR 3623236. S2CID 143865935.
