= Nasvang language =

Oceanic language of Vanuatu

Nasvang
- Native to: Vanuatu
- Region: Malekula
- Native speakers: 275 (2001)
- Language family: Austronesian: Malayo-Polynesian; Oceanic; Southern Oceanic; North-Central Vanuatu; Central Vanuatu; Malakula; Malakula Interior; Nasvang

Language codes
- ISO 639-3: None (mis)
- Glottolog: nasv1234
- ELP: Nasvang

Nasvang is an Oceanic language spoken in southeast Malekula, Vanuatu, by about 275 speakers.

The languages surrounding Nasvang include, or used to include, Port Sandwich, Nisvai, Sörsörian, Axamb and Navwien.
