= Nambas =

Traditional penis sheath from Vanuatu

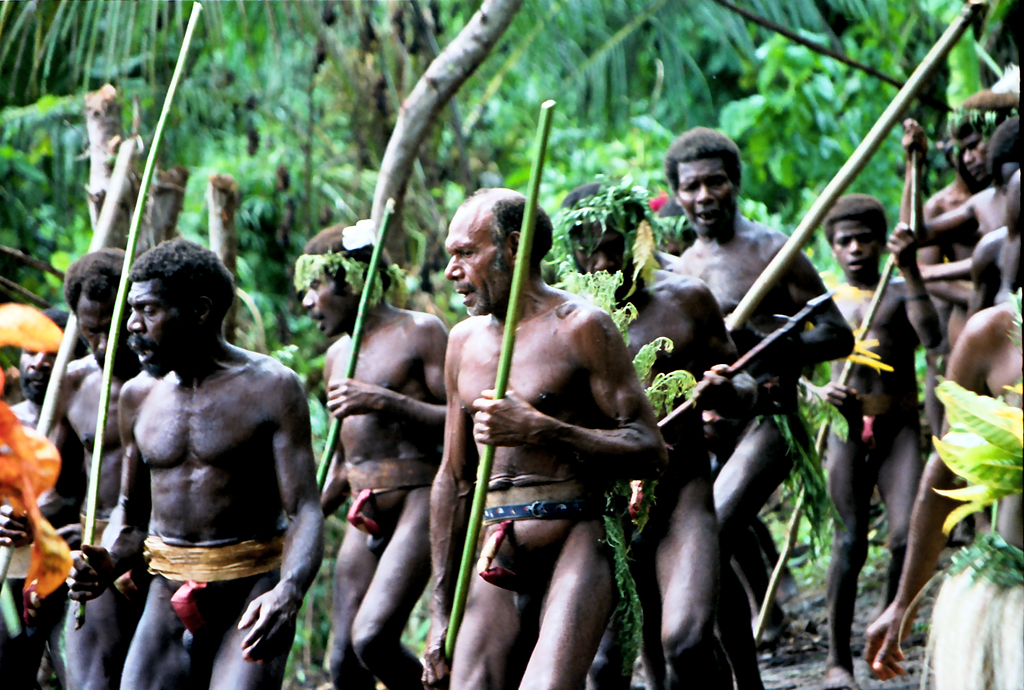
Men wearing traditional nambas during a land-diving ceremony (Pentecost Island, Vanuatu, 1992)

A nambas (from Bislama nambas) is a traditional penis sheath from Vanuatu. Nambas are wrapped around the penis of the wearer, sometimes as their only clothing. Two tribes on Malakula, the Big Nambas and the Small Nambas, are named for the size of their nambas.

Nambas are characteristic of central Vanuatu. In the northern islands, long mats wrapped around the waist are worn instead.

== Etymology ==
The word namba is derived from the Bislama word nambas. This is itself borrowed from Port Sandwich or Rerep na-mbas "penis wrapper", from Proto-North-Central Vanuatu *na "article" and *ᵐbʷasa "penis wrapper", with cognates including Tamambo buasa [ˈᵐbʷasa]. The form nambas [naᵐbas] has been misinterpreted as bearing the plural suffix -s of English (although such a suffix does not exist in Bislama); through a process of back-formation, this has led certain English-language authors to make up a singular form namba in English, with nambas as its plural.

== See also ==
- Big Nambas language
- Lendamboi language, also called Small Nambas
- Koteka
- Kynodesme
- Land diving
