= Nisvai language =

Oceanic language spoken in Vanuatu

Nisvai
- Vetbon
- Native to: Vanuatu
- Region: Malekula
- Native speakers: 200 (2001)
- Language family: Austronesian: Malayo-Polynesian; Oceanic; Southern Oceanic; North-Central Vanuatu; Central Vanuatu; Malakula; Malakula Interior; Nisvai

Language codes
- ISO 639-3: None (mis)
- Glottolog: nisv1234
- ELP: Nisvai
- Nisvai is classified as Critically Endangered by the UNESCO Atlas of the World's Languages in Danger.

Nisvai is an Oceanic language spoken in southeast Malekula, Vanuatu, on the eastern tip of the island, by about 200 speakers.

The languages surrounding Nisvai include, or used to include, Port Sandwich, Nasvang, Sörsörian, Axamb and Avok.

== Name ==
The name Nisvai literally means "what".
