= Malua Bay language =

Austronesian language spoken in Vanuatu

Malua Bay
- Middle Nambas
- Native to: Vanuatu
- Region: Malekula
- Ethnicity: 720 (2001)
- Native speakers: 500 (2009)
- Language family: Austronesian: Malayo-Polynesian; Oceanic; Southern Oceanic; North-Central Vanuatu; Central Vanuatu; Malakula; Malakula Coastal; Malua Bay

Language codes
- ISO 639-3: mll
- Glottolog: malu1245
- ELP: Malua Bay
- Malua Bay is not endangered according to the classification system of the UNESCO Atlas of the World's Languages in Danger

Malua Bay (also called Middle Nambas) is an Oceanic language spoken in northwest Malekula, Vanuatu. It has two main dialects: one spoken in Malua Bay and the other spoken in Espiegles Bay.

== Classification ==
Malua, as an Oceanic language, belongs to the Austronesian language family. Furthermore, it belongs to the Malekula grouping within the Central Vanuatu subgroup, along with Nese, Botovro, Vovo, Vao, and others.

== Community ==
Malua is mainly spoken in Malua and Espiegles Bay, with a small amount of speakers in Port Vila. The majority of speakers are bilingual in Bislama, English, or French.

== Grammar ==
Malua contains a distinction between alienable and inalienable possession. Verbal predicates are marked for either realis or irrealis mood. It also exhibits nominative-accusative alignment.
