= Tirax language =

Austronesian language spoken in Vanuatu

Tirax
- Mae, Dirak
- Native to: Vanuatu
- Region: Malekula
- Native speakers: 1,000 (2001)
- Language family: Austronesian: Malayo-Polynesian; Oceanic; Southern Oceanic; North-Central Vanuatu; Central Vanuatu; Malakula; Malakula Coastal; Tirax

Language codes
- ISO 639-3: mme
- Glottolog: maee1241
- ELP: Tirax
- is not endangered according to the classification system of the UNESCO Atlas of the World's Languages in Danger

Tirax (Dirak, Mae) is an Oceanic language spoken in north east Malakula, Vanuatu.

Tirax
Tirax pronunciation

== Tirax homeland ==
The name Tirax refers to 'inland person'. The original homeland of the Tirax speakers is the mountainous interior of North Central Malakula, neighbouring Big Nambas. As the Tirax speakers embraced Christianity in the early twentieth century, they began to migrate towards the east coast, where they founded the villages of Mae, Rori and Bethel.

== Alternative names ==
Tirax speakers often refer to their own language as resan, "language, speech", or Resan Tirax. Tirax is called "Dirak" by the speakers of Northeast Malakula. Dirak is the name used to refer to Tirax in John Lynch and Terry Crowley's 2001, Languages of Vanuatu: A New Survey and Bibliography. Because it is the language of Mae village, the Tirax language is referred to as "Mae" in the Ethnologue listing, and also in Darrell Tryon's 1976, New Hebrides languages: An internal classification. See Mae language. Tirax speakers prefer not to use "Mae" as the language name, as it is also the language of Rori and Bethel.

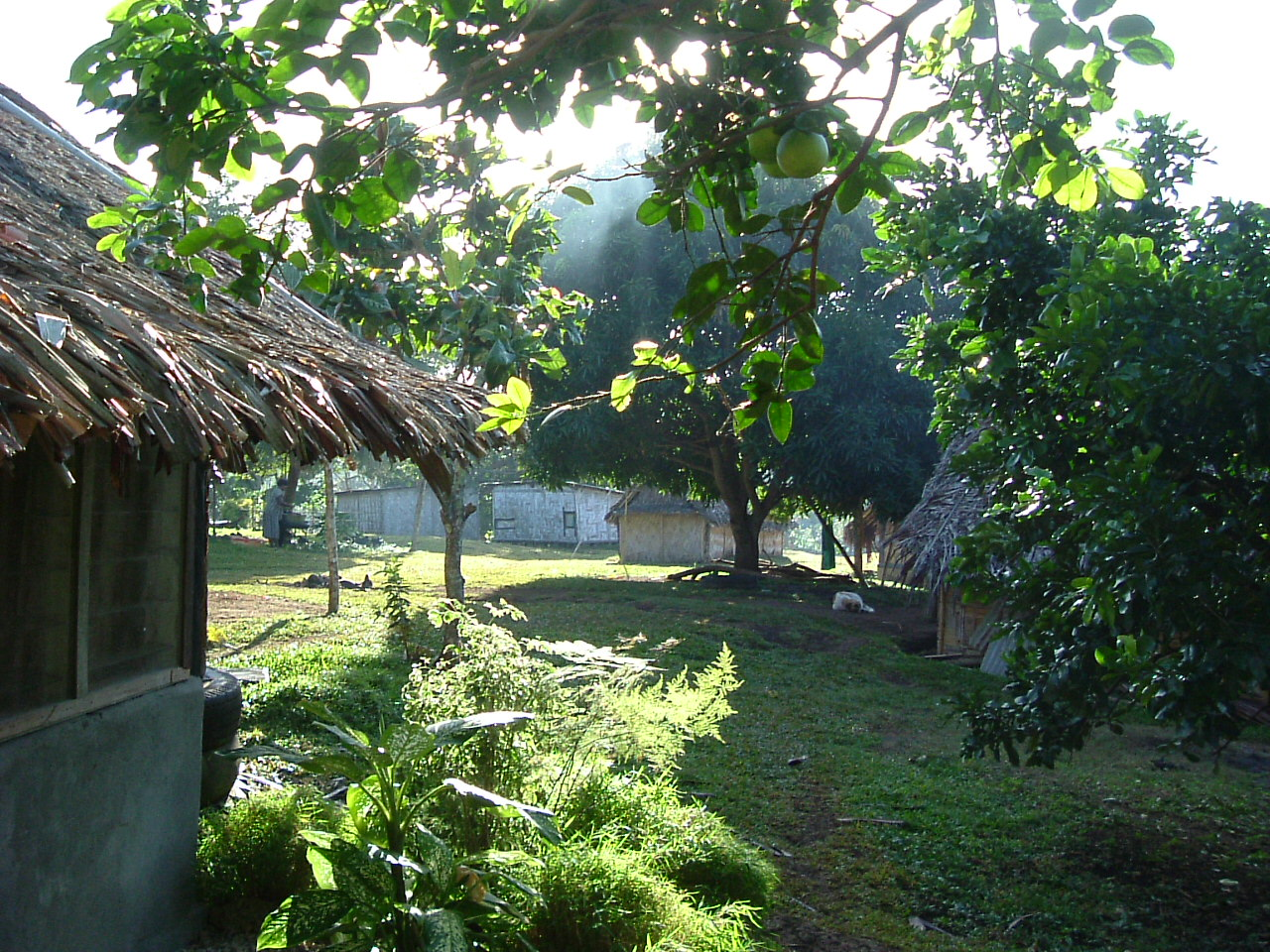
Mae village

== Typology ==
Tirax has many features in common with other North Vanuatu languages. It has no tense marking, but has "obligatory subject-mood markers distinguishing realis and irrealis mood". It has "inalienable and alienable possessive marking", with a range of "possessive classifiers for alienable possession" including specific markers for food, drink and paths. Also like other Malakula languages, numbers have verbal morphology. Tirax has "nuclear verb serialisation, and a range of strategies for paratactic linkage. Several morphosyntactic processes, such as object marking and plural marking, are sensitive to the animacy of the referent".

== Phonology ==
Tirax consonants
		Bilabial/Labiodental	Dental/Alveolar	Velar	Glottal
Plosive	Voiceless		t	k	
Plosive	Voiced	b	d	g	
Fricative	Voiceless		s	x	h
Fricative	Voiced	v			
Nasal		m	n	ŋ	
Lateral			l		
Trill			r		
Semivowel		w			

Voiced stops are prenasalized. /s/ and /r/ are alveolar, with the rest of the column being dental. It is possible that the cluster of /d/ and /r/ is actually the unit phoneme /dʳ/, a dental with a trill release.

Tirax vowels
	Front	Back
Close	i	u
Close-mid	e	o
Open-mid	ɛ	ɔ
Open	a	

=== Apicolabials ===
There is evidence that Tirax had an apicolabial (linguolabial consonant) series, likely borrowed from Big Nambas. The apicolabials are no longer part of the Tirax phoneme system, but have recently shifted to their dental consonant counterparts.

== Narrative structure ==
Until 2004, Tirax was an oral language; a writing system is a relatively recent development. Tirax narratives show previously undescribed structural features not found in written narratives. There is a linking device between paragraphs, termed "transition clauses". Transition clauses are associated with a misalignment of prosodic and discourse-semantic levels of structure. And there are a small set of circumstances in which story events are related out of chronological order, which runs counter to traditional theories of narrative.
