= Alovas language =

Malakula language of Vanuatu

Alovas
- Native to: Vanuatu
- Region: Malakula
- Language family: Austronesian: Malayo-Polynesian; Oceanic; Southern Oceanic; North-Central Vanuatu; Central Vanuatu; Malakula; North Coast; Alovas

Language codes
- ISO 639-3: None (mis)
- Glottolog: alov1235

Alovas is a Malakula language of Vanuatu. It is spoken on the northern tip of Malekula, in the central region of Vanuatu.

== Classification ==
Alovas is named for the village it is spoken in. It is, like other languages on Malekula Island, an Austronesian language. It is part of the Northern Malakula subgroup, and may be a dialect of Nese or Vovo. Information on Alovas is very limited. The number of speakers is unknown.
