= Ninde language =

Austronesian language spoken in Vanuatu

Ninde
- Labo, Mewun
- Region: Malekula, Vanuatu
- Native speakers: (1,100 cited 2001)
- Language family: Austronesian: Malayo-Polynesian; Oceanic; Southern Oceanic; North-Central Vanuatu; Central Vanuatu; Malakula; Malakula Interior; Ninde
- Writing system: Latin script

Language codes
- ISO 639-3: mwi
- Glottolog: labo1244
- ELP: Ninde
- Ninde is classified as Vulnerable by the UNESCO Atlas of the World's Languages in Danger.

Ninde (lit. 'what'), also called Labo, Meaun, or Mewun, is an Oceanic language spoken by about 1,100 people in the southwest portion of Malekula island, in Vanuatu.

One unusual feature is that it has both a voiced and a voiceless bilabial trill. It is also notable for having been spoken and discussed on an episode of An Idiot Abroad.

== Classification ==
Like other Malakula languages, Ninde is a member of the Oceanic branch of the Austronesian languages. It has relatively little lexical overlap with other nearby languages, unlike most other North-Central Vanuatu languages.

== Geographic distribution ==
Ninde is spoken in three villages on the southwestern coast of Malekula: Labo, Lawa, and Windua. Prior to World War II, Ninde speakers lived in a region called Meaun or Mewun before moving to the coast of Southwest Bay; Bernard Deacon's 1934 language survey documented the language in Mewun. Currently, speakers of Ninde live along the eastern coast of Southwest Bay. They are neighbored by speakers of Lendamboi to the north and of Sinesip (Nahavaq) to the south.

Ninde's alterantive names reflect its geographic distribution at different points in time. A 1926 sketch of Ninde calls it Meaun (a transcription error for Mewun), which was also the name of the region it was spoken in. A 1976 wordlist called it Labo, after one of the coastal villages where the speakers had moved to. Ninde itself means "what" in Ninde.

== Phonology ==
=== Consonants ===
Ross Clark summarizes existing documentation of Ninde's consonants as having approximately 19 consonants, though the exact phonemic inventory is unclear. Clark lists /bʷ/, /pʷ/, and /mʷ/ as phonemes but notes that they may be better analyzed as clusters. There is also a phoneme written as ⟨lh⟩ with an uncertain phonetic identity; one source records it as a retroflex lateral, while another lists it as a voiced dental fricative. Also, all Ninde voiced stops are prenasalized.

Ninde consonants
	Bilabial		Alveolar		Velar		Glottal
Plosive	p	b	t	d	k	ɡ	ʔ
Fricative		v	s		x		
Nasal		m		n		ŋ	
Trill				r			
Lateral approximant				l			

=== Vowels ===
Ninde has a five-vowel system. Three other vowels appear in some sources, but they are likely allophones of the five main vowels.

Ninde Monophthongs
	Front	Central	Back
	unrounded	unrounded	rounded
Close	i		u
Close-mid	e		o
Open		a	

== In popular culture ==
In Episode 1 of Series 2 of the British television programme An Idiot Abroad, Karl Pilkington is introduced to a chief of a local tribe who speaks the Ninde language. After he tells Pilkington the Ninde words for palm tree (nimdimdip), fruit (naho), and leaf (nuhuli), they joke that all the words of Ninde begin with n.

However, this general statement is actually not true. Ninde words that start with /n/ are generally inanimate common nouns of the language; the /n/ reflects an old nominal article (< Proto-Oceanic *na) which has been fused to the radical of these common nouns.
