= Tape language =

Austronesian language spoken in Vanuatu

Tape
- Maragus
- Native to: Vanuatu
- Region: Central Malekula
- Native speakers: 15 (2006)
- Language family: Austronesian: Malayo-Polynesian; Oceanic; Southern Oceanic; North-Central Vanuatu; Central Vanuatu; Malakula; Malakula Interior; Tape

Language codes
- ISO 639-3: mrs
- Glottolog: mara1399
- ELP: Tape
- Tape is classified as Critically Endangered by the UNESCO Atlas of the World's Languages in Danger.

- Location in Vanuatu
- Coordinates: 16.07°S 167.33°E

Tape, also known as Maragus, is a nearly extinct Southern Oceanic language of Vanuatu. The population of speakers of the Tape language is reduced to approximately 15 speakers who are among the older generations. The language is part of the Oceanic subgroup of the Austronesian language family.

The original location was located in an area in Malakula, including the coast from Anuatakh to Lowinsinwei, the area between the Lowisinwei River valley, the eastern bank of the Brenwei River, and a mountain in the south known as Pwitarvere. Since part of the Tape territory was close to the ocean, it allowed the people living in the area to harvest salt which was used to trade with the Tirakh people. However, the Tape people mostly lived their lives "towards the bush", meaning their lives were more oriented towards the land even though they had access to the ocean. This is shown in their language because although they lived along the coast, their descendants were not very knowledgeable or could not come up with a significant amount of terms related to the sea.

Originally, there was no distinct name for the Tape language. Tape was the name of the area that the speakers lived on while in the past the language was referred to as vengesien Tape, meaning 'the language of Tape'. Over time however, people have come to use and recognize the name of the language to be "Tape". This language also has a few alternative names known as Marakus, Maragus, Maragaus, and Maraakhus, which were used by the speakers of the Naman language who were living in the Litzlitz area. The name has two roots, mar (person of (place)) and aakhus (bush) and when they are put together, the name's literal translation is 'person of the bush'.

== Phonology ==
=== Vowels ===
Table 1: Vowel Contrasts
	Front	Central	Back
High	i		u
Mid	e	ə	o
Low		a	

In the Tape language, there are a total of six vowels /a, e, i, o, u, and ə./ Although schwa (/ə/) is part of the list, there is a lot of debate on the role schwa plays in the language.

Comparing the use of /i/ and /e/

- /ičičər/ means '(s)he swept'
- /ičečər/ means '(s)he slipped'
- /čənin/ means 'his/her intestines
- /čənen/ means 'because of it'

Comparing the use of /e/ and /a/

- /niet/ means 'sago'
- /niar/ means 'casuarina'
- /ipel/ means '(s)he choked'
- /ipar/ means '(s)he is blind'

Comparing the use of /a/ and /o/

- /maren/ means 'tomorrow'
- /mornen/ means 'his/her left hand'
- /iɣaɣas/ means it is cold'
- /iɣos/ means 'too much'

Comparing the use of /o/ and /u/

- /ilo/ means '(s)he planted'
- /ilu/ means '(s)he fired shots'
- /nio/ means 'armband'
- /niu/ means 'dew'

==== Letter exceptions ====
===== The letter /i/ =====
When the letter /i/ comes before the velar fricative /ɣ/ it becomes a high vowel.

Examples

- /liɣnana/ is pronounced [lɨyanan] meaning 'his/her face'
- pəliliɣ/ is pronounced [pəlilɨx] meaning 'wild kava'
- /tiɣ/ is pronounced [tɨx] meaning 'grave'

When the letter /i/ is the first letter and comes before the velar fricative /ɣ/, a palatal glide comes after.

Examples

- /iɣəč/ pronounced [ɨɣəts ~ jɣəts] meaning '(s)he killed it'
- /iɣan/ pronounced [ɨɣan ~ jɣan] meaning '(s)he ate'

===== The letter /u/ =====
When the /u/ is followed by another vowel, an optional rounded glide occurs between the two vowels.

Examples

- /dui/ pronounced [ⁿdui ~ ⁿduwi] meaning 'man'
- /nuo/ pronounced [nuo ~ nuwo] meaning 'water'
- /duen/ pronounced [ⁿduen ~ ⁿduwen] meaning 'with'

===== The letters /ue/ and /uo/ =====
When using the combination of /ue/, one can substituted it for /uo/, but /uo/ cannot be substituted for /ue/.

Examples

- /duen/ pronounced [ⁿduen ~ ⁿduon] meaning 'with'
- /na:bues/ pronounced [na: ᵐbues ~ ᵐbuos] meaning 'New Guinea rosewood'
- /buok/ pronounced [ᵐbuok] meaning /water taro'
- /nuot/ pronounced [nuot] meaning 'tendon'

=== Schwa ===
Comparing the use of /i/ and /ə/

- /ičile/ meaning '(s)he washed it'
- /ičəle/ meaning 's(he) combed it'
- /ilŋiliŋ meaning '(s)he walked'
- /iləŋləŋ meaning '(s)he left it'

Comparing the use of /e/ and /ə/

- /ives/ meaning 'four'
- /ivəs/ meaning 'how many?'
- /isel/ meaning 'it floated'
- /isəl/ meaning '(s)he went fishing by torchlight'

Comparing the use of /a/ and /ə/

- /ilaɣ/ meaning '(s)he is married'
- /iləɣ/ meaning '(s)he tied it up'
- /nisaɣ/ meaning 'banana'
- /nisəɣ/ meaning 'kingfisher'

Comparing the use of /o/ and /ə/

- /ičpaɣ/ meaning '(s)he squatted'
- /čəpaɣ/ meaning 'earth oven'
- /noɣmo/ meaning 'slitgong'
- /nəɣmo/ meaning 'island teak'

Comparing the use of /u/ and /ə/

- /nuɣru/ meaning 'Christmas'
- /nəɣsen/ meaning 'his/her name'
- /isusur/ meaning '(s)he swore'
- /səsən/ meaning 'her breast'

Although schwa (/ə/) is a contrastive vowel among some languages, it is not a universal vowel in all the languages in the area. In the Tape language, schwa is very common and is in 16.5% of the lexicon. The schwa is a unique vowel because it cannot begin or end a word. It also cannot follow or come before another vowel, meaning that there must be simultaneously preceded and followed by a consonant.

=== Consonants ===
Table 2: Consonants contrasts
Plain Obstruents	p̃	p	t		k
Prenazalized stops	b̃	b	d		ɡ
Affricates				t͡ʃ ~ t͡s (j)	
Fricatives	ṽ	v	s		ɣ
Nasals	m		n		ŋ
Lateral			l		
Rhotic			r		
Glides	w			j (y)	

There are many similarities as well as differences in the consonants available in the languages around the Tape area. For example, Tape does not contain any apicolabial consonants which is similar to the languages in the northeastern part of Malakua. Also the Tape language includes the contrastive palatal affricate, /č/, which is not present in V'ënen Taut, a language located near Tape. In addition, the Tape language contains a contrastive series of labiovelar consonants which the languages, V'ënen Taut, Larevat, and Naman lack.

== Grammar ==
=== Nominalization ===
One is able to obtain a noun by adding a -ien to the a verb root.

Examples

- mekar meaning 'work'
- mekar-ien meaning 'work, job'
- mësit meaning 'sick'
- mësit-ien meaning 'illness, disease'
- vërëng meaning 'think'
- vërëng-ien meaning 'thought

By adding -ien to a verb ending in p, the p will usually change to a v.

Examples

- ngep meaning 'breathe
- ngev-ien meaning 'asthma'

One is able to obtain a noun By adding në- to a verb.

Examples

- jijër meaning 'sweep'
- në-jijër meaning 'broom'

=== Compounding ===
By combining two nouns together, one is able to form a new noun related to both words.

lumlum tes
waterweed sea
'seaweed'

netite dui
child man
'boy'

Adding a place after a noun indicates the noun is originating from that particular place.

dui Tape
man location
'Tape man'

dui elo
man coast
'coastal person'

=== Possession ===
In many Oceanic languages, there is a distinction between indirect and direct possession of nouns. Indirect possession usually occurs when adding another phrase or word after the possessive noun while direct possession occurs when adding a prefix to the noun it is possessing.

nisip ese mwëliun
knife POSS chief
'the chief's knife'

pëti -k
head 1SG

==== Indirectly possessed nouns ====
There are special markers indicating the different types of possession like using ese- for general possession. Besides the general possession, there is possession towards, eating, chewing, and drinking. By adding de-, jomo-, and mëne-, one is referring to eating, chewing, and drinking respectively.

Possessive Pronouns (Edible)
	Singular	Dual	Trial	Plural
1	dok	dedru	dedëtël	ded
2	dom	-	-	-
3	den	daru	dartël	dar

mëtiu do-m
coconut ED:2SG
'your coconut (for eating)'

Possessive Pronouns (Chewable)
	Singular	Dual	Trial	Plural
1	jomok	jomodru	jomodëtël	jomod
2	jomom	-	-	-
3	jomon	jomaru	jomartël	jomar

niji jomo-m
sugarcane CHEW-2SG
'your sugarcane (for chewing)'

Possessive Pronouns (Drinkable)
	Singular	Dual	Trial	Plural
1	mënok	mënedru	mënedëtël	mëned
2	mënom	-	-	-
3	mënen	mënaru	mënartël	mënar

nuo mëno-m
water DRINK-2SG
'your water (for drinking)'

General Pronouns (General)
	Singular	Dual	Trial	Plural
1	(g)esek	(g)esedru	(g)esedëtël	(g)esed
2	(g)esom	-	-	-
3	(g)esen	(g)esaru	(g)esartël	(g)esar

nisip eso-m
knife POSS-2SG
'your knife'

==== Directly possessed nouns ====
Possessive Suffixes
	Singular	Dual	Trial	Plural
1	-k	-dru	-dëtël	-d
2	-m	-	-	-
3	-n	-ru	-rtël	-r

Example

- pëti-m (head - 2SG) meaning 'your head'

=== Numerals ===
1. isimëk, isig
2. iru
3. itël
4. ives
5. ilëm
6. lëmjis
7. jiru
8. jitël
9. jevet
10. isngel
11. isngel dëmon isimëk
12. isngel dëmon iru
13. isngel dëmon itël
14. isngel dëmon ives
15. isngel dëmon ilëm
16. isngel dëmon lëmjis
17. isngel dëmon jiru
18. isngel dëmon jitël
19. isngel dëmon jevet
20. ingelru
21. ingelru dëmon isig

When counting from 1 to 10, it is like counting in any other language where an arbitrary meaning is attached to a word. After counting to ten, one must add the word, isngel and dëmon before the numerals 1–9 to make teen numbers. The form, dëmon, has no meaning by itself in the Tape language.
