= Blowing a raspberry =

Act of making a noise like flatulence

A man blowing a raspberry

A raspberry, or razz, also known as a Bronx cheer, is a mouth noise similar to a fart that is used to signify derision. It is also used as a voice exercise for singers and actors, where it may be called a raspberry trill or tongue trill. It is made by placing the tongue between the lips and blowing, so that the tongue trills against the lower lip.

== Name ==
The nomenclature varies by country. In most Anglophone countries, it is known as a raspberry, which is attested from at least 1890, and which in the United States had been shortened to razz by 1919. The term originates in rhyming slang, where "raspberry tart" means "fart". In the United States it has also been called a Bronx cheer since at least the early 1920s.

In Italian it is known by the Neapolitan word pernacchia; in Spanish as pedorreta or trompetilla.

== Production ==
Buccal interdental trill

ↀ͡r̪͆

ↀ

Voiceless labiolingual trill

r̼̊

ʙ̼̊

Audio sample
- source · help

Voiced labiolingual trill

r̼

ʙ̼

Audio sample
- source · help

The sound is made by placing the tongue between the lips and blowing, so that the tongue trills against the lower lip. When it is used as a catcall in public arenas, the sound is sometimes blown into the palm or back of the hand to amplify its volume. In Russia it is commonly accompanied by rolling the eyes.

In the terminology of phonetics, the raspberry has been described as a (pulmonic) labiolingual trill, transcribed [r̼] or [r̼̊] (depending on voicing) in the IPA; (Note: By analogy of the bridge above diacritic ⟨◌͆⟩ used for dentolabials in extIPA, labiolinguals (with the tongue against the lower lip) may be transcribed ad hoc with the seagull above diacritic ⟨◌᫥⟩, to distinguish them from linguolabials (with the tongue against the upper lip). The labiolingual trills can therefore be transcribed as [r᫥] and [r̥᫥].) and as a buccal interdental trill, transcribed [ↀ͡r̪͆] in the extIPA (the ICPLA suggests that [ↀ] may also be used alone as an abbreviation if a speaker frequently uses the sound).

== Usage ==
Blowing a raspberry is common to many countries around the world, including European and European-settled countries and Iran. In Anglophone countries, it is associated with catcalling opposing sports teams, and with children. It is not used in any human language as a building block of words, apart from jocular exceptions. However, the vaguely similar voiced bilabial trill [ʙ] and its voiceless counterpart [ʙ̥] (essentially blowing a raspberry with only one's lips, i.e. without usage of the tongue) is a regular consonant sound in a few dozen languages scattered around the world.

== In popular culture ==
The last name of the comic-book character Joe Btfsplk is a representation of this sound.

Spike Jones and His City Slickers used a "birdaphone" to create this sound on their recording of "Der Fuehrer's Face", repeatedly lambasting Adolf Hitler with: "We'll Heil! [ Bronx cheer ] Heil! [ Bronx cheer ] Right in Der Fuehrer's Face!"

The Knorkator song "[Buchstabe]" (the actual title is a glyph) on the 1999 album Hasenchartbreaker uses a voiced linguolabial trill to replace ⟨br⟩ in a number of German words (e.g. [ˈr̼aːtkaʁtɔfl̩n] for Bratkartoffeln).

The sound is also used in the title track of the Monty Python's Flying Circus rendition of "The Liberty Bell March".

== See also ==
- Golden Raspberry Awards, which are named after the term
- The Phantom Raspberry Blower of Old London Town – Television sketch written by Spike Milligan
- Flatulence humor – Form of toilet humor
