= Avava language =

Austronesian language spoken in Vanuatu

Avava
- Katbol
- Native to: Vanuatu
- Region: Central Malekula
- Native speakers: (700 cited 2001)
- Language family: Austronesian: Malayo-Polynesian; Oceanic; Southern Oceanic; North-Central Vanuatu; Central Vanuatu; Malakula; Malakula Interior; Avava

Language codes
- ISO 639-3: tmb
- Glottolog: katb1237
- ELP: Avava
- Avava is not endangered according to the classification system of the UNESCO Atlas of the World's Languages in Danger

Avava (Navava), also known as Katbol, Tembimbe-Katbol, or Bangsa' is an Oceanic language of central Malekula, Vanuatu. It has nasalized fricatives and a bilabial trill.

The four Avava-speaking villages speak or spoke, distinct dialects. Timbembe and Nevaar (Nɨviar) are still spoken. The Nivat (Nevat) and Bangasa (Umbrul) dialects are extinct. Bangasa/Bangsa', or more correctly Bangasak, was known as Numbuwul by its neighbors to the north; the endonym is Umbbuul [(u)ᵐʙuːl].

== Names ==
The alternate names for Avava are Bangsa', Katbol, Mallicolo, Navava, Taremp, Tembimbe-Katbol and Tisvel.

== Phonology ==
When the final syllable is light (CV), stress tends to be penultimate. When the final syllable is heavy (CVC, CVV, CVː), stress tends to be final.

=== Vowels ===
There are a total of eight vowel quantities in Avava: five short vowels and three long vowels. The five short Avava vowel qualities, /a e i o u/. /u/ is pronounced [ʉ] between a bilabial trill and an alveolar and, in final syllables, between a bilabial trill and /k/. About 2% of vowels are long. Long /eː/ is not attested, and long /oː/ is marginal. This is a pattern shared with Naman. At the end of a prosodic unit – in citation form, utterance-finally and when speaking slowly – word-final vowels other than /i/ tend to be replaced with "diphthongs" /Vi/. Word-initial vowels present in citation form tend to be lost when the word is linked to others, e.g. when the subject of a verb or possessed by a pronoun. This is the reason for the alternative form of the name of the language, vava.

	front	back
high	i	u
mid	e	o
low	a	

A notable variant of the same phoneme shown with short vowels is when /u/ undergoes centralisation to [ʉ] in two different settings: in closed syllables between a bilabial trill and a following alveolar consonant, and in non-final syllables between a bilabial trill and alveolar consonant.

The three long vowels in Avava are /i:/, /u:/, and /a:/. Though there is evidence for the long /o:/, the vowel is only shown in three words throughout the entire lexicon of Avava.

=== Consonants ===
Avava consonant inventory
		Labial		Coronal	Dorsal	Glottal
		plain	labialized	Coronal	Dorsal	Glottal
Nasal		m	mʷ	n	ŋ	
Plosive	voiceless	p	(pʷ)	t	k	
Plosive	prenasalized	ᵐb	ᵐbʷ	ⁿd	ᵑɡ	
Fricative		v	vʷ	s̠	[ɣ]	h
Trill		ᵐb^{ʙ}⁽ʷ⁾		ⁿdʳ		
Tap				ɾ		
Approximant			w	l	j	

/s/ is post-alveolar. The voiceless stops are lightly aspirated. Otherwise, the consonants have the values their IPA transcriptions suggest.

/h/ does not occur at the beginning of a word. Labialized consonants are only found before /a e i/. There are some grammatical contexts and perhaps random situations when word-initial /k/ and /t/ are replaced by /ɡ/ and /d/. /pʷ/ is known from only a single word. Word-final /k/ is lost when the word is suffixed or followed by a modifier.

The prenasalized trills may be described as /mʙ, nr/, with the quite audible stop analyzed as excrescent, or as /bʙ, dr/, with the representation common in the area of prenasalized voiced stops as simply voiced stops. /ᵐb^{ʙ}/ is quite common in the language. It is generally rounded, [mbʙʷ], and word-finally the trilled release is at least partially devoiced, [mbʙ̥ʷ]. It may occur in word-final position after any vowel, but in CV position the following vowel is overwhelmingly /u/, though other vowels do occur, e.g. /suᵐb^{ʙ}ʷat/ 'coral'. It is generated grammatically when the 3sg-irrealis /b⁽ʷ⁾V/ is prefixed to a verb root beginning with /v, vʷ, v/, as in /bʷe-vʷel/ > /ᵐb^{ʙ}ʷel/ 's/he will come'.

==== Consonant allophones ====
Prenasalization is maintained after oral consonants, e.g. [ⁿdirⁿdir] 'earthquake', but is lost after a nasal, e.g. [luᵑɡamɡem] 'bamboo roof pins'. Prenasalized stops are occasionally devoiced word finally, e.g. [aⁿdʳaᵐb ~ aⁿdʳaᵐp] 'mud'.

/p/ occasionally has a trilled release when followed by /ur/: [pʰura ~ p^{ʙ̥}ura] 'spit'.

Nasals and liquids are syllabified in word-final CN, CL clusters and in medial CNC, CLC clusters: [ᵑɡitn̩tl̩] 'we (paucal inclusive)', [kopm̩tl̩] 'we (paucal exclusive)'.

/k/ is [k] word-initially, word-finally, before another consonant, and between front vowels; it is also the more common allophone between front and non-front vowels. It is [ɣ] between identical non-front vowels, and this is the more common allophone between non-identical non-front vowels.

/v, vʷ/ are generally [f, fʷ] word-initially.

== Nouns and Noun Phrases ==
=== Pronouns ===
The use of pronouns in Avava refer to what person the subject is in, the number of speakers, and the inclusivity, as shown in the table below

		singular	dual	paucal	plural
1st person	exclusive	na	kopmdru	kopmtl	kopm
1st person	inclusive	na	gitdru	gitntl	git
2nd person		ong	kamdru	kamtl	kam
3rd person		e	ierdru	iertl	ier

The paucal form of a word vs the plural form of the word is generally characterized by the number of subjects. The paucal pronouns include a small number, greater than two but less than ten. The paucal and plural forms also differ systemically as they differ in the suffixes -dur and -tl.

=== Nominalization ===
The Avava language utilizes the process of nominalization to create words from pre-existing ones. Verbal nominalization of words involve the addition of the suffix -ian.

ran → ran-ian
'dawn' → 'dawning'

sasar → sasar-ian
'teach' → 'teaching'

In some cases, the nominalized form of a reduplicated verb contains the unreduplicated root.

ngarnar → ngar-ian
'breathe' → 'breath'

Another pattern of nominalization involves the addition of the suffix -ian as well as the addition of the first vowel of the word to the beginning of the word to create a noun from a verb.

kan → a-kan-iar
'eat' → 'food'

per → e-per-ian
'work' → 'job'

=== Place of origin ===
The prefix, ma-, when added to the name of a place, refers to a person that is from that specified area.

Viar → Ma-Viar
'Viar' → {'people of Viar'}

=== Possession ===
Nouns in Avava can be divided into two categories: directly possessed nouns and indirectly possessed nouns.

==== Directly possessed nouns ====
The following generalizations can be given on the subject of these types of nouns:

- most external body parts
- many internal organs, though some do not fall under this category
- some bodily products (saliva), though many do not fall under this category
- many body parts and products associated with these animals
- some kin terms (son/daughter)
- many parts of trees and plants
