= Aveteian language =

Endangered Oceanic language of Vanuatu

Aveteian
- Dixon Reef
- Pronunciation: [avəteián₂]
- Native to: Vanuatu
- Region: Malakula
- Native speakers: probably fewer than 50 (2007)
- Language family: Austronesian: Malayo-Polynesian; Oceanic; Southern Oceanic; North-Central Vanuatu; Central Vanuatu; Malakula; Malakula Interior; Aveteian

Language codes
- ISO 639-3: dix
- Glottolog: dixo1238
- ELP: Aveteian
- Aveteian is classified as Critically Endangered by the UNESCO Atlas of the World's Languages in Danger.

Aveteian (Dixon Reef) is a possibly extinct language of Vanuatu, presumably one of the Malekula Interior languages. In the early twentieth century it was spoken by a few families living to the north of Ninde.
