= AHB =

AHB may refer to:

- Al Hilal Bank
- Abha Airport in Abha, Saudi Arabia
- Africanized honeybee
- Air Historical Branch, the historical archive service of the Royal Air Force
- All Hallows, Bow, a church in East London
- Auckland Harbour Bridge in Auckland, New Zealand
- Axamb language
- Automatic Half Barrier, a term used in the UK for a type of level crossing
- Advanced High-performance Bus
