= Port Sandwich language =

Austronesian language spoken in Vanuatu

Port Sandwich
- Lamap
- Native to: Vanuatu
- Region: Malakula
- Native speakers: (1,200 cited 2001)
- Language family: Austronesian: Malayo-Polynesian; Oceanic; Southern Oceanic; North-Central Vanuatu; Central Vanuatu; Malakula; Malakula Coastal; Port Sandwich

Language codes
- ISO 639-3: psw
- Glottolog: port1285
- ELP: Port Sandwich
- Port Sandwich is not endangered according to the classification system of the UNESCO Atlas of the World's Languages in Danger

- Location of Lamap, the primary village where Port Sandwich is spoken, on Malakula Port Sandwich language (Oceania)
- Coordinates: 16°25′0″S 167°49′55″E

Port Sandwich, or Lamap, is an Oceanic language spoken in southeast Malekula, Vanuatu, on the eastern tip of the island. It was first described in 1979 by French linguist Jean-Michel Charpentier.

== Classification ==
Port Sandwich is part of the North-Central Vanuatu branch of the Oceanic subfamily of the Austronesian languages. It is closely related to two nearby languages: Ahamb and Maskelynes.

== Geographic distribution ==
Port Sandwich is spoken on both sides of its namesake bay, on the southeastern coast of the island of Malekula. The village of Lamap is the population centre for speakers of the language, and is sometimes given as the name of the language. It is bordered by the Nisvai, Banam Bay, and Maskelynes languages.

== Phonology ==
=== Consonants ===
In addition to the consonants listed below, plain voiced stops ([b], [d], [g]) are attested but appear to be rare and/or allophones of the prenasalized voiced stops. Bilabial stop-trill sequences (voiceless /pᴘ/ and prenasalized voiced /ᵐbʙ/) are also attested and likely phonemic.

Port Sandwich consonants
		Labial		Alveolar	Palatal	Velar
		plain	lab.	Alveolar	Palatal	Velar
Plosive	voiceless	p	pʷ	t	c	k
Plosive	prenasal	ᵐb	ᵐbʷ	ⁿd		ᵑɡ
Fricative		v	vʷ	s		x
Nasal		m	mʷ	n		ŋ
Trill				r		
Lateral				l		

=== Vowels ===
Port Sandwich vowels
	Front		Central	Back
	unround	round	unround	round
Close	i	y		u
Mid	e	ø		o
Open			a	

== Writing system ==
Like many other languages on Malakula, there is not a codified writing system for Port Sandwich.
