= Aulua language =

Austronesian language spoken in Vanuatu

Aulua
- Native to: Vanuatu
- Region: East Malekula
- Native speakers: 750 (2001)
- Language family: Austronesian: Malayo-Polynesian; Oceanic; Southern Oceanic; North-Central Vanuatu; Central Vanuatu; Malakula; Malakula Coastal; Aulua

Language codes
- ISO 639-3: aul
- Glottolog: aulu1238
- ELP: Aulua
- Aulua is not endangered according to the classification system of the UNESCO Atlas of the World's Languages in Danger

Aulua or Aulua Bay is an Oceanic language spoken in east Malekula, Vanuatu.

== Names ==
The alternate names for Aulua are Aulua Bay and Mallicolo.
