= Rutan language =

Language

Rutan
- Native to: Vanuatu
- Region: Malakula
- Language family: Austronesian: Malayo-Polynesian; Oceanic; Southern Oceanic; North-Central Vanuatu; Central Vanuatu; Malakula; Malakula Interior; Rutan

Language codes
- ISO 639-3: None (mis)

Rutan is a Malakula language of Vanuatu.
