= Unua language =

Austronesian language spoken in Vanuatu

Unua
- Native to: Vanuatu
- Region: Malekula
- Native speakers: (750 cited 1999)
- Language family: Austronesian: Malayo-Polynesian; Oceanic; Southern Oceanic; North-Central Vanuatu; Central Vanuatu; Malakula; Malakula Coastal; Unua-Pangkumu; Unua

Language codes
- ISO 639-3: onu
- Glottolog: unua1237
- ELP: Unua
- Unua is not endangered according to the classification system of the UNESCO Atlas of the World's Languages in Danger

Unua, or Onua, is an Oceanic language spoken in south-east Malekula, Vanuatu. It is said to be a dialect of the same language, Unua-Pangkumu, as Rerep (Pangkumu).

== Phonology ==
The following table lists the contrastive consonant sounds of Unua. There are 16 consonant phonemes for younger Unua speakers and an additional three contrastive velarized labial consonants for older speakers, shown below in parentheses.

Consonants
		Bilabial		Coronal	Dorsal
		plain	labial	Coronal	Dorsal
Nasal		m		n	
Plosive	voiceless	p	(pʷ)	t	k
Plosive	prenasal	ᵐb	(ᵐbʷ)	ⁿd	ᵑɡ
Affricate				t͡ʃ	
Fricative		β	(βʷ)	s	ɣ
Rhotic/Trill		ᵐʙ		ɾ, r	
Approximant				l	

The following table lists the contrastive vowel sounds of Unua. Younger speakers have five vowel phonemes and older speakers have an additional three, shown in parentheses.

Vowels
	Front	Central	Back
High	i	(ʉ)	u
Mid	e (ø)	(ɵ)	o
Low		a	

== Grammar ==
Unua has SVO ordering.
