= Navwien language =

Possibly extinct language of Vanuatu

Navwien
- Native to: Vanuatu
- Region: Malakula
- Native speakers: "handful" (2013)
- Language family: Austronesian: Malayo-Polynesian; Oceanic; Southern Oceanic; North-Central Vanuatu; Central Vanuatu; Malakula; Malakula Interior; Navwien

Language codes
- ISO 639-3: None (mis)
- Glottolog: navw1234
- ELP: Navwien
- Navwien is classified as Critically Endangered by the UNESCO Atlas of the World's Languages in Danger.

Navwien is a possibly extinct language of Vanuatu, presumably one of the Malekula Interior languages. It was spoken in the southwestern corner of Malekula, near Malfaxal.
