= Njav language =

Malakula language of Vanuatu

Njav
- Native to: Vanuatu
- Region: Malakula
- Native speakers: 10 (2015)
- Language family: Austronesian: Malayo-Polynesian; Oceanic; Southern Oceanic; North-Central Vanuatu; Central Vanuatu; Malakula; Malakula Interior; Njav

Language codes
- ISO 639-3: None (mis)
- ELP: Njav

Njav is a Malakula language of Vanuatu. There are about 10 speakers.

== Sources ==
- François, Alexandre; Franjieh, Michael; Lacrampe, Sébastien; Schnell, Stefan (2015), "The exceptional linguistic density of Vanuatu", in François, Alexandre; Lacrampe, Sébastien; Franjieh, Michael; Schnell, Stefan (eds.), The Languages of Vanuatu: Unity and Diversity, Studies in the Languages of Island Melanesia, Canberra: Asia Pacific Linguistics Open Access, pp. 1–21, ISBN 9781922185235.
