= Bwenelang language =

Oceanic language spoken in Vanuatu

Bwenelang
- Mbwenelang
- Native to: Vanuatu
- Region: Malekula
- Language family: Austronesian: Malayo-Polynesian; Oceanic; Southern Oceanic; North-Central Vanuatu; Central Vanuatu; Malakula; Malakula Interior; Bwenelang

Language codes
- ISO 639-3: None (mis)
- Glottolog: bwen1239
- ELP: Mbwenelang

Bwenelang (Mbwenelang) (also known as Xoli) is an Oceanic language spoken on Malekula, Vanuatu.
