= Najit language =

Oceanic language of Malakula, Vanuatu

Najit
- Native to: Vanuatu
- Region: Malakula
- Native speakers: < 5 (2015)
- Language family: Austronesian: Malayo-Polynesian; Oceanic; Southern Oceanic; North-Central Vanuatu; Central Vanuatu; Malakula; Malakula Interior; Najit

Language codes
- ISO 639-3: None (mis)
- ELP: Najit

Najit is a Malakula language of Vanuatu, spoken by fewer than five speakers.

== Sources ==
- Charpentier, Jean-Michel (1982). Atlas linguistique du Sud-Malekula — Linguistic Atlas of South Malekula (Vanuatu). Paris: Centre National de la Recherche.
- François, Alexandre; Franjieh, Michael; Lacrampe, Sébastien; Schnell, Stefan (2015), "The exceptional linguistic density of Vanuatu", in François, Alexandre; Lacrampe, Sébastien; Franjieh, Michael; Schnell, Stefan (eds.), The Languages of Vanuatu: Unity and Diversity, Studies in the Languages of Island Melanesia, Canberra: Asia Pacific Linguistics Open Access, pp. 1–21, ISBN 9781922185235.
