= Nitita language =

Endangered language of Vanuatu

Nitita
- Native to: Vanuatu
- Region: Malakula
- Language family: Austronesian: Malayo-Polynesian; Oceanic; Southern Oceanic; North-Central Vanuatu; Central Vanuatu; Malakula; Malakula Interior; Nitita

Language codes
- ISO 639-3: None (mis)
- Glottolog: niti1249
- ELP: Nitita

Nitita is a highly endangered language of Vanuatu, presumably a Malekula Interior language.
