= Nasarian language =

Austronesian language spoken in Malekula, Vanuatu

Nasarian
- Native to: Vanuatu
- Region: Central Malekula
- Native speakers: 5 (2001)
- Language family: Austronesian: Malayo-Polynesian; Oceanic; Southern Oceanic; North-Central Vanuatu; Central Vanuatu; Malakula; Malakula Interior; Nasarian

Language codes
- ISO 639-3: nvh
- Glottolog: nasa1240
- ELP: Nasarian
- Nasarian is classified as Critically Endangered by the UNESCO Atlas of the World's Languages in Danger.

Nasarian is a nearly extinct Oceanic language of southwest Malekula, Vanuatu, though the handful of speakers includes children.
