= Larëvat language =

Austronesian language spoken in Vanuatu

Larëvat
- Native to: Vanuatu
- Region: Central Malekula
- Native speakers: 680 (2001)
- Language family: Austronesian: Malayo-Polynesian; Oceanic; Southern Oceanic; North-Central Vanuatu; Central Vanuatu; Malakula; Malakula Interior; Larëvat

Language codes
- ISO 639-3: lrv
- Glottolog: lare1249
- ELP: Larëvat
- Larëvat is not endangered according to the classification system of the UNESCO Atlas of the World's Languages in Danger

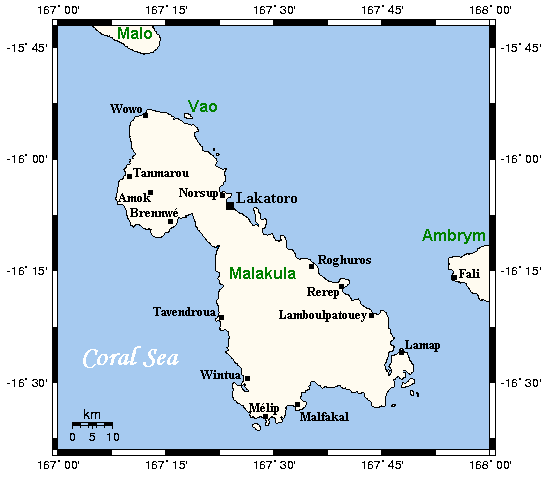
Island of Malakula

Larëvat is an Oceanic language of central Malekula, Vanuatu.

The current population of Larëvat-speaking villages is estimated at around 675 speakers. They are located around Losinwei, which is also known as the "neck of the dog" due to the island looking like a sitting dog.
