= Vivti language =

Endangered Oceanic language of Vanuatu

Vivti
- Native to: Vanuatu
- Region: Malakula
- Native speakers: <5
- Language family: Austronesian: Malayo-Polynesian; Oceanic; Southern Oceanic; North-Central Vanuatu; Central Vanuatu; Malakula; Malakula Interior; Vivti

Language codes
- ISO 639-3: None (mis)
- Glottolog: vivt1234
- ELP: Vivti

Vivti is a highly endangered language of Vanuatu, presumably a Malekula Interior language. There are less than five speakers in the world.
