= Linguolabial consonant =

Consonant produced with tongue against the upper lip

Linguolabial

◌̼

◌᫥
Image

Linguolabials, or more specifically apicolabials and laminolabials, are consonants articulated by placing the tongue tip or blade against the upper lip, which is drawn downward to meet the tongue. They represent one extreme of a coronal articulatory continuum that extends from labio-lingual to subapical-palatal places of articulation. Cross-linguistically, linguolabial consonants are very rare. They are found in a cluster of 17 Southern Oceanic languages in Vanuatu, in the Kajoko dialect of Bijago in Guinea-Bissau, in Umotína (a recently extinct Bororoan language of Brazil), and as paralinguistic sounds elsewhere, such as 'expressive' words in Mochi Chaga. They are also relatively common in disordered speech, and the IPA diacritic is specifically provided for in the extensions to the IPA, as it is otherwise rare enough that speech pathologists might be unaware of it.

== Description ==
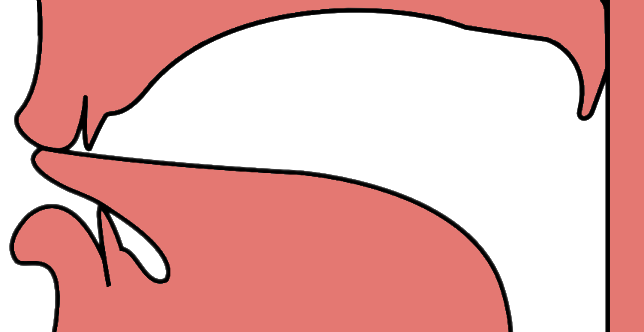
Sagittal section of a linguolabial stop.

Linguolabials are produced by constricting the airflow between the tongue and the upper lip. They are attested in a number of manners of articulation including stops, nasals, and fricatives. Linguolabial lateral consonants are phonetically distinctive, but are not used contrastively in any known language.

== Transcription ==
Linguolabial consonants are transcribed in the International Phonetic Alphabet with the "seagull" diacritic, U+033C ◌̼ COMBINING SEAGULL BELOW, or potentially the same diacritic above, U+1AE5 ◌᫥ COMBINING SEAGULL ABOVE, if the letter has a descender.

Transcription is inconsistent. The seagull diacritic was adopted by the IPA at the Kiel Convention in 1989. It was to be used on alveolar consonant letters. Only ⟨t̼ d̼⟩ were illustrated, but if the 'alveolar' instruction were followed, the consonant series would be written ⟨t̼ d̼ n̼ s̼ z̼⟩. This notation is seen in a number of sources. However, linguolabial fricatives are not sibilants, and in the extIPA chart in the IPA Handbook of 1999, they are illustrated on dental letters, making the series ⟨t̼ d̼ n̼ θ̼ ð̼⟩. This notation is also seen in a number of sources; indeed some, such as Ladefoged & Maddieson (1996), employ both. More recently, official IPA transcription has used it on labial letters: ⟨p᫥ b̼ m̼ f̼ v̼⟩. The choice of the base consonant may depend on whether the author analyses the linguolabial as being phonologically labial or alveolar.

Twenty years before Kiel, the IPA had transcribed such sounds with the (yet-to-be-approved) apical diacritic, U+033A ◌̺ COMBINING INVERTED BRIDGE BELOW, on a labial letter, with the analysis of these sounds as apico-labial. However, Olson et al. (2013, p. 64) state that this solution is 'unsuitable' because the articulation of linguolabials may be either apical or laminal.

== List of consonants ==
IPA letter		Description	Example				
Coronal	Labial	Description	Language	Orthography	IPA		Meaning
n̼	m̼	linguolabial nasal	Araki	m̈ana	[n̼ana]	[m̼ana]	"laugh"
t̼	p̼	voiceless linguolabial plosive	Tangoa	p̈ep̈e	[t̼et̼e]	[p̼ep̼e]	"butterfly"
d̼	b̼	voiced linguolabial plosive	Kajoko dialect of Bijago		[nɔ̀d̼ɔ́ːɡ]	[nɔ̀b̼ɔ́ːɡ]	"stone"
θ̼	f̼	voiceless linguolabial fricative	Big Nambas		[ˈinɛθ̼]	[ˈinɛf̼]	"he is asthmatic" (Voiceless word-initially and -finally.)
s̼	f̼	voiceless linguolabial fricative	Big Nambas		[ˈinɛs̼]	[ˈinɛf̼]	"he is asthmatic" (Voiceless word-initially and -finally.)
ð̼	v̼	voiced linguolabial fricative	Tangoa	v̈atu	[ð̼atu]	[v̼atu]	"stone"
z̼	v̼	voiced linguolabial fricative	Tangoa	v̈atu	[z̼atu]	[v̼atu]	"stone"
ǀ̼	ʘ̼	linguolabial click release (potentially multiple consonants)	Coatlán Zapotec	(paralinguistic)	[ǀ̼ʔ]	[ʘ̼ʔ]	Mimesis of eating soup or of a pig drinking water.
ʇ̼	ɋ᫥	linguolabial click release (potentially multiple consonants)	Coatlán Zapotec	(paralinguistic)	[ʇ̼ʔ]	[ɋ᫥ʔ]	Mimesis of eating soup or of a pig drinking water.

== Labiolinguals ==
By analogy of the distinction made between labiodentals and dentolabials, labiolinguals may be distinguished as consonants articulated by touching the tongue to the lower lip (thus being sublaminal). Such sounds could conceivably be distinguished by placing the diacritic above the letter, as with dentolabials, but that is not an established convention.

Transcription		Description	Example				
IPA	ExtIPA	Description	Language	Orthography	IPA		Meaning
r̼̊	ↀr̪͆	A voiceless labiolingual trill; common mimetic sound worldwide carrying various meanings, but not used as a part of typical speech.	Coatlán Zapotec	(paralinguistic)	[r̼̊ʔ]	[ʙ̼̊ʔ]	Mimesis of a child's flatulence.
ʙ̼̊	ↀr̪͆	A voiceless labiolingual trill; common mimetic sound worldwide carrying various meanings, but not used as a part of typical speech.	Coatlán Zapotec	(paralinguistic)	[r̼̊ʔ]	[ʙ̼̊ʔ]	Mimesis of a child's flatulence.
ɺ̼	¡᫥	The release of [ɺɺ̼]~[ɺ¡᫥], a lateral double-flap allophone of /ɡ/ used in special speech performance, which is a sublaminal strike of the lower lip.	Pirahã	toogixi	[tòːɺɺ̼ìʔì]		"hoe"
ɾ᫥	¡᫥	The release of [ɺɺ̼]~[ɺ¡᫥], a lateral double-flap allophone of /ɡ/ used in special speech performance, which is a sublaminal strike of the lower lip.	Pirahã	toogixi	[tòːɺɺ̼ìʔì]		"hoe"

== Linguolabials as a diachronic stage in sound shifts ==
In Vanuatu, some of the Santo–Malekula languages have shifted historically from bilabial to alveolar consonants via an intermediate linguolabial stage, which remains in other Santo and Malekula languages.

While labials have become linguolabial before nonrounded vowels in various languages (e.g. Tangoa, Araki, Nese), the sound shift went further in languages such as Tolomako, which shifted the linguolabials to full alveolar consonants: *b > *[p] > p̈ [t̼] > t [t]; *m > m̈ [n̼] > n [n]. Thus, POc *bebe 'butterfly' > [t̼et̼e] (spelled p̈ep̈e in Tangoa or in Araki) later became [tete] in Tolomako. Likewise, POc *tama 'father' > [tan̼a] (cf. Tangoa tam̈a, Araki r̄am̈a) > Tolomako [tana].

However, in several languages linguolabials are shifting back to bilabial, namely in Tutuba, Vʼënen Taut, Tangoa, Mavʼea.

== Distribution ==
Languages that have linguolabials as ordinary speech sounds:

Country	Language	Phonemes	
Country	Language	(Coronal letter)	(Labial letter)
Vanuatu	Aore, Araki, Mafea, Mpotovoro, Tangoa	/t̼, n̼, ð̼/	/p᫥, m̼, v̼/
Vanuatu	Vʼënen Taut	/t̼, n̼, θ̼~ð̼/	/p᫥, m̼, f̼~v̼/
Vanuatu	Nese, Vao	/ⁿd̼, n̼, ð̼/	/ᵐb̼, m̼, v̼/
Vanuatu	Tutuba	/ⁿd̼, n̼/	/ᵐb̼, m̼/
Guinea-Bissau	Bijago, Kajoko dialect	/d̼/	/b̼/

== See also ==
- Place of articulation
- List of phonetics topics

== Notes ==
Place →	Labial					Coronal										Dorsal					Laryngeal			
Manner ↓	Bilabial		Labiodental		Linguolabial		Dental		Alveolar		Postalveolar		Retroflex		(Alveolo-)palatal		Velar		Uvular		Pharyngeal/epiglottal		Glottal	
Nasal	m̥	m	ɱ̊	ɱ		n̼	n̪̊	n̪	n̥	n	n̠̊	n̠	ɳ̊	ɳ	ɲ̊	ɲ	ŋ̊	ŋ	ɴ̥	ɴ				
Plosive	p	b	p̪	b̪	t̼	d̼	t̪	d̪	t	d			ʈ	ɖ	c	ɟ	k	ɡ	q	ɢ	ʡ		ʔ	
Sibilant affricate							t̪s̪	d̪z̪	ts	dz	t̠ʃ	d̠ʒ	tʂ	dʐ	tɕ	dʑ								
Non-sibilant affricate	pɸ	bβ	p̪f	b̪v			t̪θ	d̪ð	tɹ̝̊	dɹ̝	t̠ɹ̠̊˔	d̠ɹ̠˔			cç	ɟʝ	kx	ɡɣ	qχ	ɢʁ	ʡʜ	ʡʢ	ʔh	
Sibilant fricative							s̪	z̪	s	z	ʃ	ʒ	ʂ	ʐ	ɕ	ʑ								
Non-sibilant fricative	ɸ	β	f	v	θ̼	ð̼	θ	ð	θ̠	ð̠	ɹ̠̊˔	ɹ̠˔	ɻ̊˔	ɻ˔	ç	ʝ	x	ɣ	χ	ʁ	ħ	ʕ	h	ɦ
Approximant		β̞		ʋ				ð̞		ɹ		ɹ̠		ɻ		j		ɰ						˷
Tap/flap		ⱱ̟		ⱱ					ɾ̥	ɾ			ɽ̊	ɽ						ɢ̆		ʡ̆		
Trill	ʙ̥	ʙ							r̥	r		r̠	ɽ̊r̥	ɽr					ʀ̥	ʀ	ʜ	ʢ		
Lateral affricate									tɬ	dɮ			tꞎ	d𝼅	c𝼆	ɟʎ̝	k𝼄	ɡʟ̝						
Lateral fricative							ɬ̪		ɬ	ɮ			ꞎ	𝼅	𝼆	ʎ̝	𝼄	ʟ̝						
Lateral approximant								l̪	l̥	l		l̠	ɭ̊	ɭ	ʎ̥	ʎ	ʟ̥	ʟ		ʟ̠				
Lateral tap/flap									ɺ̥	ɺ			𝼈̊	𝼈		ʎ̆		ʟ̆						

		BL	LD	D	A	PA	RF	P	V	U
Implosive	Voiced	ɓ			ɗ		ᶑ	ʄ	ɠ	ʛ
Implosive	Voiceless	ɓ̥			ɗ̥		ᶑ̊	ʄ̊	ɠ̊	ʛ̥
Ejective	Stop	pʼ			tʼ		ʈʼ	cʼ	kʼ	qʼ
Ejective	Affricate		p̪fʼ	tθʼ	tsʼ	tʃʼ	tʂʼ	tɕʼ	kxʼ	qχʼ
Ejective	Fricative	ɸʼ	fʼ	θʼ	sʼ	ʃʼ	ʂʼ	ɕʼ	xʼ	χʼ
Ejective	Lateral affricate				tɬʼ			c𝼆ʼ	k𝼄ʼ	q𝼄ʼ
Ejective	Lateral fricative				ɬʼ					
Click (top: velar; bottom: uvular)	Tenuis	kʘ qʘ		kǀ qǀ	kǃ qǃ		k𝼊 q𝼊	kǂ qǂ		
Click (top: velar; bottom: uvular)	Voiced	ɡʘ ɢʘ		ɡǀ ɢǀ	ɡǃ ɢǃ		ɡ𝼊 ɢ𝼊	ɡǂ ɢǂ		
Click (top: velar; bottom: uvular)	Nasal	ŋʘ ɴʘ		ŋǀ ɴǀ	ŋǃ ɴǃ		ŋ𝼊 ɴ𝼊	ŋǂ ɴǂ	ʞ	
Click (top: velar; bottom: uvular)	Tenuis lateral				kǁ qǁ					
Click (top: velar; bottom: uvular)	Voiced lateral				ɡǁ ɢǁ					
Click (top: velar; bottom: uvular)	Nasal lateral				ŋǁ ɴǁ					
