= Malfaxal language =

Austronesian language spoken in Vanuatu

Malfaxal
- Malvaxal, Na'ahai
- Native to: Vanuatu
- Region: Malekula
- Native speakers: (600 cited 1983)
- Language family: Austronesian: Malayo-Polynesian; Oceanic; Southern Oceanic; North-Central Vanuatu; Central Vanuatu; Malakula; Malakula Coastal; Malfaxal

Language codes
- ISO 639-3: mlx
- Glottolog: malf1237
- ELP: Naha'ai
- Malfaxal is not endangered according to the classification system of the UNESCO Atlas of the World's Languages in Danger

Malfaxal (Malvaxal), also known as Na'ahai, is one of the many languages of the Malekula Coast group of Vanuatu.
