= Nahavaq language =

Austronesian language spoken in Vanuatu

Nahavaq
- South West Bay, Siesip
- Native to: Vanuatu
- Region: Malekula
- Ethnicity: 860 ethnic population (no date)
- Native speakers: (600 cited 2001)
- Language family: Austronesian: Malayo-Polynesian; Oceanic; Southern Oceanic; North-Central Vanuatu; Central Vanuatu; Malakula; Malakula Coastal; Nahavaq

Language codes
- ISO 639-3: sns
- Glottolog: sout2857
- ELP: Nahavaq
- Nahavaq is not endangered according to the classification system of the UNESCO Atlas of the World's Languages in Danger

Nahavaq, also known as South West Bay (Malekula) or Siesip, is one of the many languages of the Malekula Coast group of Vanuatu.
