= Nese language =

Oceanic language of Vanuatu

Nese
- Region: Matanvat area, northwest Malakula, Vanuatu
- Native speakers: 20 (2010)
- Language family: Austronesian: Malayo-Polynesian; Oceanic; Southern Oceanic; North-Central Vanuatu; Central Vanuatu; Malakula; Malakula Interior; Nese

Language codes
- ISO 639-3: None (mis)
- Glottolog: nese1235
- ELP: Nese
- Nese is classified as Definitely Endangered by the UNESCO Atlas of the World's Languages in Danger.

Nese is a moribund Oceanic language or dialect known by no more than twenty people in the Matanvat area of the northwest tip of the island of Malakula in Vanuatu. It is now rarely spoken, having been replaced as a primary mode of communication by Bislama.

Nese is one of the few languages to have linguolabial consonants.

== Name ==
The name Nese literally means "what".

== Phonology ==
=== Consonants ===
		Labial	Linguolabial	Alveolar	Palatal	Velar
Nasal		m	m̼	n		ŋ
Stop	Plain			t	t͡ʃ	k
Stop	Prenasalised	ᵐb	ᵐb̼	ⁿd		
Fricative		v	v̼	s		ɣ
Tap				ɾ		
Trill				r		
Approximant		w		l	j	

=== Vowels ===
	Front	Central	Back
High	i		u
Mid	e		o
Low		a	

== Grammar ==
Some nouns are required to be possessed, typically those expressing inalienable possession. These are followed by a possessive suffix marking the person and number of the possessor For those nouns where possession is optional, a possessive pronoun attaches to a possessive classifier, which has different forms if the possessed noun is intended to be eaten, or if it is intended to be drunk.

Verbs are marked for the person and number of both their subject and object. The subject prefixes co-occur with overt arguments, while the object suffixes cannot. An irrealis marker follows the subject prefix in appropriate contexts, though it is fused into a portmanteau morpheme with the first person singular marker. The language has no class of adjectives that can be distinguished from intransitive stative verbs, which may occur within the noun phrase, or function as a predicate.

Independent pronouns, as well as the pronominal markers appearing on verbs and possessed nouns, distinguish three persons, two numbers (singular and plural), and make an inclusive/exclusive distinction in the first person plural.

Some prepositions take the same object suffixes that verbs do to mark their complement, while others do not. "te" is used as a subordinator for complement and relative clauses, while it combines with other words to mark adverbial clauses, combining with a purposive preposition for adverbial purpose clauses, but a different, non-preposition word for temporal adverbial clauses.

== Revitalization ==
Some speakers have initiated language revitalization activities such as informal teaching by elders to children, and use of Nese songs in church. Nese is also taught in the Matanvat kindergarten, though not as the primary language of instruction.
