= Malakula languages =

Group of Oceanic languages spoken in Vanuatu

Malakula
- Malekula
- Geographic distribution: Malakula Island in central Vanuatu
- Linguistic classification: Austronesian: Malayo-Polynesian; Oceanic; Southern Oceanic; North-Central Vanuatu; Central Vanuatu; Malakula
- Proto-language: Proto-Malakula

Language codes
- Glottolog: mala1539

The Malakula languages are a group of Central Vanuatu languages spoken on Malakula Island in central Vanuatu. Unlike some earlier classifications, linguist and Oceanic languages specialist John Lynch (2016) considered the Malakula languages to form a coherent group.

== Features ==
One distinctive feature of the Malakula languages is the pervasive loss of unstressed syllables. However, according to Lynch (2014), the innovation occurred after Proto-Malakula broke up, and may have occurred on at least seven different independent occasions.

== Classification ==
Lynch (2016) divides the Malakula languages into three primary subgroups, namely Northern, Eastern, and Western, all three of which are linkages. Lynch (2016) recognizes 32 languages.

- Malakula
  - Northern
    - Malua Bay
    - North Coast
      - Nese
      - Botovro
      - Vovo, Vao
  - Eastern
    - Uripiv
    - Unua
    - Aulua
    - Banam Bay
    - Southeastern
      - Bwenelang
      - Nasvang, Nisvai
      - Port Sandwich, Avok, Axamb
      - Maskelynes
  - Western
    - Central Western
      - Neve'ei
      - Larëvat
      - Naman
    - Peripheral Western
      - Ninde
      - Nāti
      - Northwestern
        - V'ënen Taut
        - Tape
        - Tirax
      - Southwestern
        - Lendamboi
        - Aveteian
        - Navwien
        - Avava
        - Nasarian
        - Naha'ai, Nahavaq

The Central-Western linkage is only very weakly defined, while Ninde and Nāti have similarities with both the Northwestern and Southwestern linkages.

The positions of the Sörsörian, Rerep, Vivti, and Nitita languages were not addressed.

== Languages ==
François et al. (2015:18-21) list the following 42 Malakula languages.

No.	Language	Other names	Speakers	ISO 639-3
65	Axamb	Ahamb	750	ahb
66	Lendamboi	Small Nambas, Letemboi	800	nms
67	Nasvang		275	
68	Sörsörian		3	
69	Avok		500	
70	Uliveo	Maskelynes	1100	klv, Maskelynes
71	Port Sandwich	Lamap	1200	psw
72	Nisvai	Vetbon	200	
73	Burmbar	Banam Bay, Vartavo	900	vrt
74	Mbwenelang		<10	
75	Aulua		750	aul
76	Niolean	Repanbitip	90	rpn
77	Rerep	Pangkumu, Tisman	380	pgk
78	Unua	Onua	520	onu
79	Vivti		<5	
80	Nitita		<5	
81	Avava	Katbol, Navava, Bangsa’	700	tmb
82	Neverver	Lingarak, Nevwervwer	1250	lgk
83	Litzlitz	Naman	15	lzl
84	Uripiv	Uripiv-Wala-Rano-Atchin, Northeast Malakula	9000	upv, Atchin, Uripiv
85	Rutan		?	
86	Botovro	Mpotovoro	430	mvt
87	Vao		1900	vao, Vao
88	Alovas		?	
89	Vovo		475	
90	Nese	Matanvat	160	
91	Najit		<5	
92	Malua Bay	Middle Nambas	500	mll
93	Njav		10	
94	Tirax	Mae, Dirak	1000	mme
95	V'ënen Taut	Big Nambas	3350	nmb
96	Tape	Maragus	15	mrs
97	Larëvat	Laravat, Larevat	680	lrv
98	Neve'ei	Vinmavis	500	vnm
99	Nivat		<10	
100	Nasarian		5	nvh
101	Aveteian	Dixon Reef	50	dix
102	Ninde	Labo	1100	mwi
103	Nahavaq	South West Bay, Siesip	700	sns
104	Nāti		25	
105	Naha'ai	Malvaxal, Malfaxal	600	mlx
106	Navwien		5	

== Vocabulary comparison ==
=== Numbers ===
English	Bislama	Aulua	Axamb	Big Nambas	Maskelynes	Neverver	Ninde	Tirax	Uripiv	Vao
one	wan	bokol	ngajhay ngajkenene	isët, iamëk	esua	iskham	sei	haxal	ites	xete
two	tu	e nrua	ngaru	iru	eru	iru	khuwo	iru	eru	xeru
three	tri	e ntil	ngarür	itl	itor	itl	tël	itil	itul	xetol
four	fo	e mbis	ngavaj	iv'a	ivat	ivas	wes	ivat	ivij	xevat
five	faef	elima	ngarëm	ilëm'	erim	ilim	selme	ilin	ilim	xelime
six	sikis	ro bokol	ngarëm rahjkay	ilëmsei	emëlevtes	ijos	dumane sei	ixɔwɛn	owon	xeyon
seven	seven	roku rua	ngarëm rahru	isaru	emëlevru	ijoru	dumane khuwo	iwedit	ebœt	xebüt
eight	eit	rok til	ngarëm rahrür	isatl	emëlevtor	ijotl	dumane tël	ixewɛl	owil	xoal
nine	naen	rokbis	ngarëm rahpaj	isav'et	emëlevpat	ijovas	dumane wes	ixesiv	esiw	xehive
ten	ten	sagabul	ngasngavur	sënal, inal	saŋavur	nangavul	langal, thangal	ihŋavil	esŋawœl	hangavul

=== Other basic words ===
English	Bislama	Aulua	Axamb	Big Nambas	Maskelynes	Neverver	Ninde	Tirax	Uripiv	Vao
water	wota	nave	nuwoi	nauei tarah (taboo synonym)	nëwai	nio	nowoi	nua/nue	nua	?
woman	wuman	momo	napnevër	tav'et	pëhaṽut	vin	watawox	vinadr	leter	?
child	pikinini	netina	tete	mardel	tëtai	niterikh	?	ntɛbih	tipis	?
child (of someone)	pikinini	netina	narën	nat	natu	niterikh	netnowox	net	natu	?
