= Nāti language =

Oceanic language of Vanuatu

Nāti
- Native to: Vanuatu
- Region: Central Malekula
- Native speakers: (moribund cited 1998)
- Language family: Austronesian: Malayo-Polynesian; Oceanic; Southern Oceanic; North-Central Vanuatu; Central Vanuatu; Malakula; Malakula Coastal; Nāti

Language codes
- ISO 639-3: None (mis)
- Glottolog: nati1244
- ELP: Nāti
- Nāti is classified as Critically Endangered by the UNESCO Atlas of the World's Languages in Danger.

Nāti (Naati, Nahati) is a nearly extinct Oceanic language of southwest Malekula, Vanuatu.
