= Maskelynes language =

Austronesian language spoken in Vanuatu

Maskelynes
- Kuliviu, Uliveo
- Native to: Vanuatu
- Region: Malekula
- Native speakers: (1,100 cited 2001)
- Language family: Austronesian: Malayo-Polynesian; Oceanic; Southern Oceanic; North-Central Vanuatu; Central Vanuatu; Malakula; Malakula Coastal; Maskelynes

Language codes
- ISO 639-3: klv
- Glottolog: mask1242
- Maskelynes is not endangered according to the classification system of the UNESCO Atlas of the World's Languages in Danger

Maskelynes (/ˈmæskəlɪns/), or Kuliviu (Uliveo), is an Oceanic language spoken on the Maskelyne Islands off south Malekula, Vanuatu.

== Phonology ==
Maskelynes has twenty consonants and six vowel phonemes. Any vowel length is due to vowel clusters across morpheme breaks, and is not phonemic.

=== Consonants ===
		Labial		Coronal	Dorsal
		plain	labiovelarized	Coronal	Dorsal
Nasal		m	mʷ	n	ŋ
Plosive	unvoiced	p	pʷ	t̪	k
Plosive	voiced	ᵐb	ᵐbʷ	ⁿd̪	ᵑg
Fricative		β	βʷ	s	x~ɣ~ʀ
Approximant			w	l	j
Rhotic				r~ɾ	

- /ᵐb, ⁿd, ᵑg/ are in free variation as unreleased [ᵐb̚, ⁿd̚, ᵑg̚] or unvoiced [p, t, k] word-finally or before a consonant
  - /ᵑg/ is also in free variation as nasal [ŋ] word-finally, especially among young speakers
- /ᵑg/ is realized as a voiceless [k] among some speakers, especially young
- /p, pʷ, t/ are unreleased [p̚, p̚, t̚] word-finally or before a consonant (though /p/ has never been recorded before a consonant)
- /mʷ, pʷ, ᵐbʷ, βʷ/ lose their labialization word-finally when not followed by a vowel and before /o, u/
  - /ᵐbʷ/ is in free variation as trilled [ᵐʙ] (tapped [ᵐⱱ̟] in Peskarus) before /u/ and sometimes before /ə/
- /βʷ/ is [β] before voiced consonants
- /β, βʷ/ are [ɸ] before voiceless consonants and word-finally
- /β/ is in free variation with [ɸ] for some speakers
- /w, j/ are vocalic [u, i] when in nucleus following /e, a, o/

=== Vowels ===
	Front	Central	Back
Close	i		u (u̥)
Mid	ɛ	ə	o
Open			ɑ

- /i/ is near-close [ɪ] between front consonants
- /ɛ/ is close-mid [e] word-finally
- /ə/ is [ɵ] after labiovelarized consonants or before /xu̥/
- /əj, əw/ are realised as single phones, [i, u]
- /u/ is realised as front [y] between front consonants, and near-close [ʊ] when proceeded or preceded by back consonants
- /o/ is front [ø] between front consonants

==== Voiceless vowel ====
A voiceless [u̥] occurs at the ends of words. It is uncertain if it is an allophone of /u/ or a separate phoneme

=== Phonotactics ===
Possible syllable structures in Maskelynes: (C/S)V(S)(C)

== Orthography ==
Maskelynes alphabet
Letter	a	b	b̃	d	e	ǝ	g	h	i	k	l	m	m̃	n	ŋ	o	p	p̃	r	s	t	u	w	v	ṽ	w/u	y/i
IPA	ɑ	ᵐb	ᵐbʷ	ⁿd̪	ɛ	ə	ᵑɡ	x	i	k	l	m	mʷ	n	ŋ	o	p	pʷ	r	s	t̪	u	u̥	β	βʷ	w	j

== Grammar ==
=== Verbs ===
The verbs of Maskelynes are agglutinative, mostly being modified by prefixes, though the stem of a verb can stand on its own. These prefixes encode for, in order of appearance in verb: 1. tense-aspect-modes; 2. subject, person and number; 3. various modes, including realis and irrealis; 4. two tense-modes; 5. reduplication. The object of a sentence is encoded by a suffix.

Examples of verbal agglutination:

sa-g-e-mun-i
PROH-2SG.SUBJ-IRR-drink-3SG.OBJ
Don't you drink it.

go-to-madha-mun-mun-i
2SG.SUBJ-REL-IMM.PST-ITER~drink-3SG.OBJ
You who just now kept drinking it

==== Reduplication ====
Reduplication in Maskelynes has various usages, and can encode for e.g. plurality, habituality, iterative aspect, etc.

== Bibliography ==
- Healey, David S. (2013). A GRAMMAR OF MASKELYNES: THE LANGUAGE OF ULUVEU ISLAND, VANUATU (PDF) (PhD). University of the South Pacific. Archived (PDF) from the original on 2020-05-31.
