= Avok language =

Austronesian language spoken in Vanuatu

Avok
- Native to: Vanuatu
- Region: South Malekula
- Native speakers: 500 (2015)(ELP)
- Language family: Austronesian: Malayo-Polynesian; Oceanic; Southern Oceanic; North-Central Vanuatu; Central Vanuatu; Malakula; Malakula Coastal; Avok

Language codes
- ISO 639-3: None (mis)
- Glottolog: avok1244
- ELP: Avok
- Avok is not endangered according to the classification system of the UNESCO Atlas of the World's Languages in Danger

Avok is an Oceanic language spoken in South Malakula, Vanuatu. It is noted for its liquid consonants.
