= Burmbar language =

Austronesian language spoken in Vanuatu

Burmbar
- Banam Bay, Vartavo
- Native to: Vanuatu
- Region: Malekula
- Native speakers: 900 (2001)
- Language family: Austronesian: Malayo-Polynesian; Oceanic; Southern Oceanic; North-Central Vanuatu; Central Vanuatu; Malakula; Malakula Coastal; Burmbar

Language codes
- ISO 639-3: vrt
- Glottolog: burm1263
- ELP: Burmbar
- Burmbar is not endangered according to the classification system of the UNESCO Atlas of the World's Languages in Danger

Burmbar (alternate names: Denggan, Ndenggan, Banam Bay, Vartavo) is one of the Malakula languages of Vanuatu.

== Names ==
Alternate names for Burmbar include Banam Bay, Vartavo, Banan Bay and Mallicolo.
