= Botovro language =

Austronesian language spoken in Vanuatu

Botovro
- Mpotovoro
- Native to: Vanuatu
- Region: Malekula
- Native speakers: (430 cited 2001)
- Language family: Austronesian: Malayo-Polynesian; Oceanic; Southern Oceanic; North-Central Vanuatu; Central Vanuatu; Malakula; Malakula Coastal; Botovro

Language codes
- ISO 639-3: mvt
- Glottolog: mpot1241
- ELP: Botovro
- Botovro is not endangered according to the classification system of the UNESCO Atlas of the World's Languages in Danger

Botovro (Mpotovoro) is an Oceanic language, which is primarily spoken at the north tip of Malekula, Vanuatu. The language is the first language spoken by older people. It is not taught in schools.
