= Rerep language =

Austronesian language spoken in Vanuatu

Rerep
- Pangkumu, Tisman
- Native to: Vanuatu
- Region: East Malekula
- Native speakers: (380 cited 1983)
- Language family: Austronesian: Malayo-Polynesian; Oceanic; Southern Oceanic; North-Central Vanuatu; Central Vanuatu; Malakula; Malakula Coastal; Unua-Pangkumu; Rerep
- Dialects: Tisman

Language codes
- ISO 639-3: pgk
- Glottolog: rere1240
- ELP: Rerep
- Rerep is not endangered according to the classification system of the UNESCO Atlas of the World's Languages in Danger

Rerep (also Pangkumu or Tisman) is one of the great many languages of the Malekula Coast group spoken in Vanuatu. In 1983 it had 375 speakers out of an ethnic population of 580. Portions of the Bible were translated into Rerep between 1892 and 1913.
