= Big Nambas language =

Austronesian language spoken in Vanuatu

Big Nambas
- Vʼënen Taut
- Pronunciation: [ˈθ̼ənɛn tautʰ]
- Native to: Vanuatu
- Region: Northwest Malekula
- Native speakers: (3,400 cited 2001)
- Language family: Austronesian: Malayo-Polynesian; Oceanic; Southern Oceanic; North-Central Vanuatu; Central Vanuatu; Malakula; Malakula Interior; Big Nambas
- Writing system: Latin script

Language codes
- ISO 639-3: nmb
- Glottolog: bign1238
- Vʼënen Taut is not endangered according to the classification system of the UNESCO Atlas of the World's Languages in Danger

Big Nambas, also known as Vʼënen Taut, is an Oceanic language spoken by about 3,400 people (as of 2001) in northwest Malekula, Vanuatu. Approximately nineteen villages in the Big Nambas region of the Malekula Interior use the language exclusively, with no variation in dialect. It was studied in depth over a period of about ten years by missionary Greg J. Fox, who published a grammar and dictionary in 1979. A Big Nambas translation of the Bible was recently completed by Andrew Fox.

== Phonology ==
=== Consonants ===
The consonant phonemes of Big Nambas are as shown in the following table:

		Bilabial	Linguo- labial	Alveolar	Velar
Nasal		m	n̼	n	
Plosive	voiceless	p	t̼	t	k
Plosive	prenasal			ⁿd	
Fricative		β	ð̼	s	ɣ
Approximant				l	
Trill				r	

- /p, t, k/ are aspirated [pʰ, tʰ, kʰ] word finally. /t̼/ is not noted as behaving likewise.
- /m, p/ are labialized [mʷ, pʷ] before /i, e/.
- The voiced fricatives /β, ð̼, ɣ/ are devoiced [ɸ, θ̼, x] word initially and finally.
- /l/ is realized as [ɬ] word finally or when adjacent to /t/, and as [ɮ] when adjacent to /n/ word medially.

=== Vowels ===
Big Nambas has a 5-vowel system with the following phonemes:

	Front	Central	Back
Close	i		u uː
Mid	e	ə	
Open		a aː	

=== Phonotactics ===
Big Nambas has a complex syllable structure with a large amount of consonant clusters possible (e.g. drnlak "my ear"). Additionally, clusters of up to four vowels are permitted (e.g. nauei "water"). Stress in Big Nambas is phonemic, but partly predictable. The consonants /t β r l n/ all exhibit phonemic gemination when two identical ones occur between syllables. Linguolabial consonants are often marked with an apostrophe in the orthography to distinguish them from their bilabial counterparts.

== Grammar ==
Big Nambas is a synthetic, head-marking language.

=== Nouns ===
There are three noun classes in Big Nambas:

1. Obligatorily possessed nouns, most commonly constituent parts of any object (body parts, tree parts, ordinals, possessive)
2. Optionally possessed nouns, with the subclasses:
  1. Nouns taking the third singular possessives nan or nen
  2. Nouns taking the prefix ar- "all"
  3. Title nouns (names and kinship terms)
3. Unpossessed nouns (personal and interrogative pronouns)

Big Nambas features a system of complex nouns, formed by derivation. Derived nouns can be of one of five types:

1. Abstract nouns, formed by suffixing -ien to verb stems (e.g. tkar "be pregnant" vs. tkar-ien "pregnancy")
2. Articled nouns, formed by prefixing na- or n- to a verb stem beginning with a vowel (i-u "it rains" vs. n-u "(the) rain")
3. Ordinal nouns, formed by prefixing the nominalizer ni- and suffixing the possessive -a (tl "three" vs. ni-tl-a "the third of")
4. Determinative nouns, formed by prefixing ter- to some adjective stems (p'arei "long" vs. ter-p'arei "the long one")
5. Reverential nouns, formed by suffixing -et to some nouns (nut "place" vs. nutet "a sacred place", cf. nap' "fire" vs. nep'et "sacred fire")

Nouns in Big Nambas may be compounded by following them with a verb stem.

dəh-uas
tail-be.yellow
"yellow-tail (fish)"

== Bibliography ==
- Fox, G. J. (1979). Big Nambas Grammar. Pacific Linguistics. ISBN 0-85883-183-X.
