= Sörsörian language =

Extinct language of Vanuatu

Sörsörian
- Native to: Vanuatu
- Region: Malakula
- Native speakers: 3 (2015)
- Language family: Austronesian: Malayo-Polynesian; Oceanic; Southern Oceanic; North-Central Vanuatu; Central Vanuatu; Malakula; Malakula Interior; Sörsörian

Language codes
- ISO 639-3: None (mis)
- Glottolog: sors1241
- ELP: Sörsörian
- Sörsörian is classified as Critically Endangered by the UNESCO Atlas of the World's Languages in Danger.

Sörsörian is a possibly extinct language of Vanuatu, presumably one of the Malekula Interior languages.
