= Vao language =

Oceanic language spoken in Vanuatu

Vao
- Region: Vao Island and northern Malakula, Vanuatu
- Native speakers: 1,900 (2001)
- Language family: Austronesian: Malayo-Polynesian; Oceanic; Southern Oceanic; North-Central Vanuatu; Central Vanuatu; Malakula; Malakula Interior; Vao

Language codes
- ISO 639-3: vao
- Glottolog: vaoo1237
- Vao is not endangered according to the classification system of the UNESCO Atlas of the World's Languages in Danger

Vao is an Austronesian language of the Oceanic branch spoken by about 1,900 people on Vao Island and on the nearby shores of Malakula Island, Vanuatu.

== Characteristics ==
Vao is one of the few languages of the world that possesses linguolabial consonants.
