= Lendamboi language =

Austronesian language spoken in Vanuatu

Lendamboi
- Letemboi, Small Nambas
- Native to: Vanuatu
- Region: Malakula
- Ethnicity: 1,100 (2001)
- Native speakers: 800 (2001)
- Language family: Austronesian: Malayo-Polynesian; Oceanic; Southern Oceanic; North-Central Vanuatu; Central Vanuatu; Malakula; Malakula Interior; Lendamboi
- Dialects: Repanbitip (Niolean)

Language codes
- ISO 639-3: nms – inclusive code Individual code: rpn – Repanbitip
- Glottolog: lete1241
- ELP: Lendamboi
- Niolean
- Lendamboi is not endangered according to the classification system of the UNESCO Atlas of the World's Languages in Danger

Lendamboi, Letemboi, or Small Nambas, is one of the Malekula Interior languages of Vanuatu.
