= Litzlitz language =

Austronesian language spoken in Vanuatu

Litzlitz
- Naman
- Native to: Vanuatu
- Region: Central Malekula
- Native speakers: (15 cited 2001)
- Language family: Austronesian: Malayo-Polynesian; Oceanic; Southern Oceanic; North-Central Vanuatu; Central Vanuatu; Malakula; Malakula Interior; Litzlitz

Language codes
- ISO 639-3: lzl
- Glottolog: litz1237
- ELP: Litzlitz
- Litzlitz is classified as Critically Endangered by the UNESCO Atlas of the World's Languages in Danger.

Litzlitz, also known as Naman, is an endangered Oceanic language of central Malakula, Vanuatu. Many of the languages in Malakula can be referred to by different names, Litzlitz being an example of this. Naman was spoken in central Malakua in an area referred to as the "Dog's Neck" by the locals. The territory over which the Naman language was spoken is about 13 kilometers. This language once had many speakers, but now has been classified as a dying language with only fifteen to twenty native speakers. Native Naman speakers who one resided in the small villages of Metenesel in the Lambumbu area of Malakula had moved to what is now known as the Litzlitz village. They had moved because of diseases such as influenza and other epidemics, which contributed to the population decrease in the Naman speakers. Malakula has many languages, however Uripiv has become the dominant language of the Northeast Malakula area.

== Phonology ==
=== Consonants ===
The table below shows the set of consonants in the Litzlitz language, based on the International Phonetic Alphabet.

Litzlitz consonants
	Labial	Alveolar	Palatal	Velar
Plain obstruents		t	c	k
Prenasalised obstruents	ᵐb	ⁿd	ᶮɟ	ᵑg
Fricatives	v	s		ɣ
Nasals	m	n		ŋ
Lateral		l		
Rhotic		r		
Glides	w		j	

Contrasts between pairs of phonetically similar consonants can be based on the following minimal and sub-minimal pairs:

- /t/ and /d/ /toro/ 'old' /doro/ 'white-throated pigeon'
- /k/ and /g/ /nikəj/ 'whitewood species' /igər/ 'it fell from above' /kəlue/ 'you will shoot it' /gəlo/ '(s)he looked'
- /t/ and /s/ /təɣ/ '(s)he took it' /səɣ/ '(s)he poked it'
- /c/ and /s/ /bəcbəc/ 'break to pieces' /bəsbəs/ '(s)he spoke'
- /c/ and /j/ /cəbən/ 'his/her grandfather' /jəbən/ 'his/her finger/toe'
- /s/ and /j/ /səl/ '(s)he entered' /jəl/ '(s)he sewed it'
- /t/ and /c/ /təɣ/ '(s)he took it' /cəɣən/ 'to (person)'
- /l/ and /r/ /laɣe/ 'to the bush' /raɣe/ 'above'

=== Vowels ===
Litzlitz has an inventory of six contrasting short vowels and three long vowels, as shown below in the table. Only the high and low vowels have corresponding long forms, with the three mid vowels having only short forms.

Litzlitz vowels
	Front	Mid	Back
High	i i:		u u:
Mid	e	ə	o
Low		a a:	

== Phonotactics ==
Lexical roots in the Litzlitz language begin mostly with consonants rather than vowels. There is only a limited number of words that begin with the vowels /u/, /a/, /e/, or /ə/. The words that begin with the vowel /u/ include /user/ 'resemble', /usus/ 'ask', /utbu/ 'run', and /uvov/ 'white' and one verb beginning with /e/ which is /esəɣ/ 'not exist'. The only vowel that is used commonly at the beginning of lexical roots is /i/. The vowel-sequencing possibilities within Litzlitz roots can be summarized with these generalizations:

- sequences of the low vowel /a/ followed by any of the mid vowels are prohibited. i.e. */ae/, */ao/.
- sequences of */eo/ and */oe/ are prohibited.
- sequences of any like vowels are prohibited.
- sequences of a long vowel with any other vowel are prohibited.
- sequences of any vowel and schwa other than /iə/ are prohibited: */aə/, */uə/, */oə/, */eə/.

== Nouns and noun phrases ==
=== Pronouns ===
Within the Litzlitz language, pronouns are distinguished between three categories which include first, second, and third person. They each mark a three-way number distinction between singular, dual, and plural. In the first person non-singular, there is a distinction made between inclusive and exclusive pronouns. The table below shows the words for each of the pronouns.

Independent pronouns
		Singular	Dual
1st person	Inclusive	kine	(i)getaru, (i)gëtaru
1st person	Exclusive	kine	kam(em)ru, kamemaru
2nd person		a(khu)g	(i)gem(a)rum, (i)gëm(a)ru
3rd person		ai ~ i	(r)aru

The letters in brackets are indicators of variability, however the function or meaning does not change. The first person singular kine and the third person plural air are the only two pronouns without variations.

=== Possession ===
The only inflection of morphology associated with nouns in the Litzlitz language involves the expression of possession with a particular subset of nouns. As it is often found it in other Oceanic languages, there is a distinction in Litzlitz between what can be called indirectly and directly possessed nouns. With indirectly possessed nouns, both the possessor and possessum are expressed as free forms. With directly possessed nouns, the possessum is expressed by means of a bound nominal root to which an inflectional possessive suffix is obligatorily attached. An example of this is shown below:

- jëbë-g 'my grandfather'
- noag sog 'my canoe'

There are different suffix forms for all categories of singular pronominal possessor, and for any category of third person pronominal possessor. There are no separate possessive suffixes for dual and plural pronominal possessors in the first and second person, all of which is illustrated in the table below.

Direct possessive suffixes
	Singular		Dual	Plural
1	-g	Inclusive		
		Exclusive		
2	-m			
3	-n		-raru	-r

An example of these suffixes can be seen on the noun jëbë- 'grandfather':

- jëbë-g 'my grandfather'
- jëbë-m 'your grandfather'
- jëbë-n 'his/her grandfather
