= Voiced bilabial trill =

Consonantal sound represented by ⟨ʙ⟩ in IPA

ʙ
- IPA number: 121

Audio sample
- source · help

Encoding
- Entity (decimal): &#665;
- Unicode (hex): U+0299
- X-SAMPA: B\
- Braille: ⠔ (braille pattern dots-35) ⠃ (braille pattern dots-12)
Image

A voiced bilabial trill is a type of consonantal sound, used in some spoken languages. The symbol in the International Phonetic Alphabet that represents the sound is ⟨ʙ⟩, a small capital letter b.

== Features ==
Features of a voiced bilabial trill:

- Its manner of articulation is trill, which means it is produced by directing air over an articulator so that it vibrates.
- Its place of articulation is bilabial, which means it is articulated with both lips.
- Its phonation is voiced, which means the vocal cords vibrate during the articulation.
- It is an oral consonant, which means that air is not allowed to escape through the nose.
- Because the sound is not produced with airflow over the tongue, the median–lateral dichotomy does not apply.
- Its airstream mechanism is pulmonic, which means it is articulated by pushing air only with the intercostal muscles and abdominal muscles, as in most speech sounds.

== Occurrence ==
=== Plain ===
Slowed-down recording of the bilabial trill
A bilabial trill held for 3 seconds, with the recording slowed down.

Occurrences of [ʙ] in various languages
Language		Word	IPA	Meaning	Notes
Damin		pr2уuu	[ʙ\ʙjuː]	'branch'	Can either be single pr [ʙ] or doubled pr2 [ʙ\ʙ] depending on the word
Dongo		bbo̍	[ʙō]	'two'	Phonemic. Contrasts with /ʙ̥/.
Isthmus Zapotec					
Kilmeri		ppipe	[ʙipɛ]	'blossom'	
Komi-Permyak		[ʙuɲɡaɡ]		'dung beetle'	Generally paralinguistic. Apart from interjections, [ʙuɲɡaɡ] is the only lexeme this sound is found in.
Kwomtari		[ʙɨt]		'to hit'	
Lizu		[tʙ̩˥˧]		'bean'	Syllabic; allophone of /u/ after initial /pʰ, p, b, tʰ, t, d/.
Mangbetu		[nóʙù]		'to fan'	Contrasts with /ʙ̥, ᵐʙ, ⱱ/.
Medumba		[mʙʉ́]		'dog'	
Min Chinese	Lei	牛	[ʙu¹¹]	'ox' or 'cow'	Appearing in elderly accents. A variant of /b/ before /u/. Similar words include "梅" (plum) and "肥" (fat).
Ngwe	Lebang dialect	[àʙɨ́]		'ash'	
Pirahã		kaoáíbogi	[kàò̯áí̯ʙòˈɡì]	'evil spirit'	Allophone of /b/ before /o/
Pumi		[pʙ̩˥]		'to dig'	Syllabic; allophone of /ə/ after /pʰ, p, b, tʰ, t, d/.
Sko		[mbʙul]		'pig'	

=== Prenasalized ===
Occurrences of [ᵐʙ] in various languages
Language	Word	IPA	Meaning	Notes
Ahamb	[nãᵐʙwas]		'pig'	Contrasts with /ʙ̥/.
Kele	[ᵐʙulim]		'face'	May occur in other languages of the Admiralty Islands.
Kilmeri	[kəᵐʙul]		'rain'	
Mangbetu	[nóᵐʙù]		'to enclose'	Contrasts with /ʙ̥, ʙ, ⱱ/.
Titan	[ᵐʙutukei]		'wooden plate'	
Unua	[ᵐʙue]		'pig'	

=== Prestopped trills and stops with trill release ===
These are treated as single segments. For stop–trill consonant clusters, see the § Plain table.

Language	Word	IPA	Meaning	Notes
Namuyi	tbĭh	[t͡ʙ̩˨]	'to slaughter'	[ʙ] is classified as an allophone of /u/ following /p, b, t, d/ in the phonemic analysis of Huáng (1992:673–674), and Yǐn (2016). Phonemic according to Pavlík (2017), occurring before /u/ or as a syllabic consonant; the trill components may be voiceless [ʙ̥] when preceded by voiceless plosives. No bilabial trills are present in the phonemic analysis of Nishida (2013).
Namuyi	dbù	[d͡ʙu˥˨]	'wild'	[ʙ] is classified as an allophone of /u/ following /p, b, t, d/ in the phonemic analysis of Huáng (1992:673–674), and Yǐn (2016). Phonemic according to Pavlík (2017), occurring before /u/ or as a syllabic consonant; the trill components may be voiceless [ʙ̥] when preceded by voiceless plosives. No bilabial trills are present in the phonemic analysis of Nishida (2013).
Namuyi	pbĭh	[p͡ʙ̩]	'to deliver'	[ʙ] is classified as an allophone of /u/ following /p, b, t, d/ in the phonemic analysis of Huáng (1992:673–674), and Yǐn (2016). Phonemic according to Pavlík (2017), occurring before /u/ or as a syllabic consonant; the trill components may be voiceless [ʙ̥] when preceded by voiceless plosives. No bilabial trills are present in the phonemic analysis of Nishida (2013).
Namuyi	Bbuda	[b͡ʙuda]	surname	[ʙ] is classified as an allophone of /u/ following /p, b, t, d/ in the phonemic analysis of Huáng (1992:673–674), and Yǐn (2016). Phonemic according to Pavlík (2017), occurring before /u/ or as a syllabic consonant; the trill components may be voiceless [ʙ̥] when preceded by voiceless plosives. No bilabial trills are present in the phonemic analysis of Nishida (2013).
Sangtam	[kʰi˥t̪͡ʙa˧]		'hip joint'	Word-medial realization of phonemic /t̪͡ʙ̥/, contrasts with aspirated /t̪͡ʙ̥ʰ/.

== Phonology ==
In many of the languages in which the bilabial trill occurs, it occurs only as part of a prenasalized bilabial stop with trilled release, [mbʙ]. That developed historically from a prenasalized stop before a relatively high back vowel like [mbu]. In such instances, the sounds are usually still limited to the environment of a following [u]. However, the trills in Mangbetu may precede any vowel and are sometimes preceded by only a nasal.

== See also ==
- Index of phonetics articles
- Voiceless bilabial trill

== Notes ==
Place →	Labial					Coronal										Dorsal					Laryngeal			
Manner ↓	Bilabial		Labiodental		Linguolabial		Dental		Alveolar		Postalveolar		Retroflex		(Alveolo-)palatal		Velar		Uvular		Pharyngeal/epiglottal		Glottal	
Nasal	m̥	m	ɱ̊	ɱ		n̼	n̪̊	n̪	n̥	n	n̠̊	n̠	ɳ̊	ɳ	ɲ̊	ɲ	ŋ̊	ŋ	ɴ̥	ɴ				
Plosive	p	b	p̪	b̪	t̼	d̼	t̪	d̪	t	d			ʈ	ɖ	c	ɟ	k	ɡ	q	ɢ	ʡ		ʔ	
Sibilant affricate							t̪s̪	d̪z̪	ts	dz	t̠ʃ	d̠ʒ	tʂ	dʐ	tɕ	dʑ								
Non-sibilant affricate	pɸ	bβ	p̪f	b̪v			t̪θ	d̪ð	tɹ̝̊	dɹ̝	t̠ɹ̠̊˔	d̠ɹ̠˔			cç	ɟʝ	kx	ɡɣ	qχ	ɢʁ	ʡʜ	ʡʢ	ʔh	
Sibilant fricative							s̪	z̪	s	z	ʃ	ʒ	ʂ	ʐ	ɕ	ʑ								
Non-sibilant fricative	ɸ	β	f	v	θ̼	ð̼	θ	ð	θ̠	ð̠	ɹ̠̊˔	ɹ̠˔	ɻ̊˔	ɻ˔	ç	ʝ	x	ɣ	χ	ʁ	ħ	ʕ	h	ɦ
Approximant		β̞		ʋ				ð̞		ɹ		ɹ̠		ɻ		j		ɰ						˷
Tap/flap		ⱱ̟		ⱱ					ɾ̥	ɾ			ɽ̊	ɽ						ɢ̆		ʡ̆		
Trill	ʙ̥	ʙ							r̥	r		r̠	ɽ̊r̥	ɽr					ʀ̥	ʀ	ʜ	ʢ		
Lateral affricate									tɬ	dɮ			tꞎ	d𝼅	c𝼆	ɟʎ̝	k𝼄	ɡʟ̝						
Lateral fricative							ɬ̪		ɬ	ɮ			ꞎ	𝼅	𝼆	ʎ̝	𝼄	ʟ̝						
Lateral approximant								l̪	l̥	l		l̠	ɭ̊	ɭ	ʎ̥	ʎ	ʟ̥	ʟ		ʟ̠				
Lateral tap/flap									ɺ̥	ɺ			𝼈̊	𝼈		ʎ̆		ʟ̆						

		BL	LD	D	A	PA	RF	P	V	U
Implosive	Voiced	ɓ			ɗ		ᶑ	ʄ	ɠ	ʛ
Implosive	Voiceless	ɓ̥			ɗ̥		ᶑ̊	ʄ̊	ɠ̊	ʛ̥
Ejective	Stop	pʼ			tʼ		ʈʼ	cʼ	kʼ	qʼ
Ejective	Affricate		p̪fʼ	tθʼ	tsʼ	tʃʼ	tʂʼ	tɕʼ	kxʼ	qχʼ
Ejective	Fricative	ɸʼ	fʼ	θʼ	sʼ	ʃʼ	ʂʼ	ɕʼ	xʼ	χʼ
Ejective	Lateral affricate				tɬʼ			c𝼆ʼ	k𝼄ʼ	q𝼄ʼ
Ejective	Lateral fricative				ɬʼ					
Click (top: velar; bottom: uvular)	Tenuis	kʘ qʘ		kǀ qǀ	kǃ qǃ		k𝼊 q𝼊	kǂ qǂ		
Click (top: velar; bottom: uvular)	Voiced	ɡʘ ɢʘ		ɡǀ ɢǀ	ɡǃ ɢǃ		ɡ𝼊 ɢ𝼊	ɡǂ ɢǂ		
Click (top: velar; bottom: uvular)	Nasal	ŋʘ ɴʘ		ŋǀ ɴǀ	ŋǃ ɴǃ		ŋ𝼊 ɴ𝼊	ŋǂ ɴǂ	ʞ	
Click (top: velar; bottom: uvular)	Tenuis lateral				kǁ qǁ					
Click (top: velar; bottom: uvular)	Voiced lateral				ɡǁ ɢǁ					
Click (top: velar; bottom: uvular)	Nasal lateral				ŋǁ ɴǁ					
