= Ahamb language =

Austronesian language spoken in Vanuatu

Ahamb
- Axamb, Akhamb
- Pronunciation: [aˈxaᵐp]
- Native to: Vanuatu
- Region: South Malekula
- Native speakers: 950 (2017)
- Language family: Austronesian: Malayo-Polynesian; Oceanic; Southern Oceanic; North-Central Vanuatu; Central Vanuatu; Malakula; Malakula Coastal; Ahamb

Language codes
- ISO 639-3: ahb
- Glottolog: axam1237
- ELP: Ahamb
- Axamb is not endangered according to the classification system of the UNESCO Atlas of the World's Languages in Danger

Ahamb, also spelled Axamb or Akhamb ([aˈxaᵐp]) is an Oceanic language spoken in South Malakula, Vanuatu.

Ahamb has around 1000 speakers, most of whom reside on the small low-lying Ahamb Island and the nearby Malekula mainland. The language is endangered due to a number of factors, including climate change and environmental factors.

Linguist Tihomir Rangelov published a grammatical description of Ahamb in 2020.

== Names ==
The alternate names for Ahamb are Akamb, Akhamb, Axamb and Mallicolo.

== Documentation ==
A collection of Ahamb texts is available with open access at the Endangered Languages Archive.

== Phonology ==
=== Consonants ===
Ahamb's consonant inventory is characterised by distinctive prenasalisation in its plosives and trills. There are four contrastive trills, including the typologically rare plain bilabial trill.

		Labial	Coronal	Dorsal
Nasal		m	n	ŋ
Plosive	voiceless	p	t	k
Plosive	prenasal	ᵐb	ⁿd	ᵑg
Affricate			tʃ	
Fricative		v	s	x
Approximant		w	l	j
Trill	oral	ʙ̥	r	
Trill	prenasal	ᵐʙ	ⁿᵈr	

=== Vowels ===
Ahamb's vowel inventory is relatively large compared to its relatives:

	Front		Central	Back
	unr.	rnd.	Central	Back
Close	i	y		u
Mid	e	ø	ə	o
Open			a	

== Grammar ==
Nouns in Ahamb are classified as common, personal and local. They can also be classified as alienable and inalienable, which corresponds to a structural distinction in possessive constructions involving classifiers (general and alimentary) or direct suffixation respectively. Noun phrases consist of a nominal head and various modifiers that follow it in a relatively flexible order.

Verbs in Ahamb can be transitive and intransitive. Intransitive verbs are further classified as active or stative. Detransitivisation is possible with the use of prefixation or reduplication. Verbs can take a number of prefixed tense/aspect/mood/polarity modifiers and commonly feature a subject index. Subject indexes come in three paradigms with forms for all person, number and clusivity distinctions. Neutral subject indexes are used in a variety of situations and combine most freely with other preverbal modifiers. Sequential event subject indexes are used to mark the second and subsequent verb in complex clauses that encode sequential events with the same subject. Irrealis mood subject indexes are used in interrogatives and negative modality constructions, among others. The objects of transitive verbs can be encoded by an object pro-index, which can take four different forms.

Ahamb has SVO word order. Negation can be expressed in a number of ways, including a separate prohibitive coding and a negative modality particle. Different verb-like forms can function as prepositions and deixis markers. Complementation can be expressed with or without a complementiser, corresponding to a distinction in the semantic properties of the complement taking verb. Verb serialisation has been attested on the nuclear and core level. A special type of nuclear serialisation-like construction involves coverbs – non-prototypical verb forms that are only attested in such constructions. On the core level, switch-function and ambient serialisation is attested. Subordination is possible with a large variety of conjunctions. Other complex clause types include sequential event constructions and both syndetic and asyndetic coordinating constructions.

== Bibliography ==
- "Glottolog 5.1 - Axamb". glottolog.org.
- Rangelov, Tihomir (2019). "The bilabial trills of Ahamb (Vanuatu): Acoustic and articulatory properties" (PDF). In Calhoun, S.; Escudero, P.; Tabain, M.; Warren, P. (eds.). Proceedings of the 19th International Congress of Phonetic Sciences, Melbourne, Australia 2019. Canberra: Australasian Speech Science and Technology Association Inc. pp. 1292–1296.
- Rangelov, Tihomir (2020a). A grammar of the Ahamb language (Vanuatu) (PhD thesis). Hamilton, New Zealand: University of Waikato. hdl:10289/14038.
- Rangelov, Tihomir (2020b). "Documenting Ahamb, a small-island language of Vanuatu". London: SOAS, Endangered Languages Archive. hdl:2196/a9f624c2-f4e0-44b2-9603-d2ec8efc5536.
- Rangelov, Tihomir; Bratrud, Tom; Barbour, Julie (2019). "Ahamb (Malekula, Vanuatu) – Language contexts" (PDF). Language Documentation and Description. 16: 86–126.
