= Fatumiala =

Island in Vanuatu

- Interactive map of Fatumiala

Geography
- Location: Pacific Ocean
- Coordinates: 16°51′41″S 168°30′30″E
- Archipelago: Vanuatu
- Highest elevation: 15 m (49 ft)

Administration
- Vanuatu
- Province: Shefa Province

Demographics
- Population: 0 (2015)

Fatumiala (or Sail Rock) is a small island in the Pacific Ocean, a part of the Shefa Province of Vanuatu.

== Geography ==
Sail Rock is located north-west of the island of Tongoa, between the latter and Epi. The islet has an elevation of 15 m above the sea level.

== Geology ==
Fatumiala and the other islands scattered around Tongoa (Laika, Tefala) were once part of a larger landmass, which constituted the emerged part of the Kuwae submarine volcano and which united Tongoa with Epi. The volcano's caldera exploded around 1452, creating small islands.
