= 1458 mystery eruption =

Large volcanic eruption of uncertain location

There are two large sulfate spikes caused by mystery volcanic eruptions in the mid-1400s: the 1452/1453 mystery eruption and the 1458 mystery eruption. Before 2012, the date of 1458 sulfate spike was incorrectly assigned to be 1452 because previous ice core work had poor time resolution. The exact location of this eruption is uncertain, but possible candidates include the submerged caldera of Kuwae in the Coral Sea, Mount Reclus and Tofua caldera. The eruption is believed to have been Volcanic Explosivity Index-7.

== Date of sulfate spike ==
This sulfate spike was first discovered in Antarctica ice cores and is one of largest sulfur events along with that of Samalas (1257) and Tambora (1815). Initial efforts to constrain the date of the event concluded that 1452/53 is the year of eruption with uncertainty up to a few years. Since 2012, highly accurate ice core chronology has re-dated this massive sulfur spike to 1458 and has matched with its corresponding Greenland sulfur spike though the latter is significantly smaller.

== Ice-core and tree-ring records ==
The sulfate deposition of this event is the largest recorded in ice cores in the last 700 years. The deposition however is asymmetric with much larger sulfate flux in the Antarctic ice cores compared to that of Greenland ice cores, indicating that the eruption probably occurred in the low latitudes of the Southern Hemisphere. Sulfur isotope composition of the 1458 sulfate indicates that the eruption emitted volcanic gases directly into the stratosphere, with significant impact on atmospheric chemistry and potential consequence for global climate. The reconstructed volcanic stratospheric sulfur injection of the 1458 event estimates that about 37.5 trillion grams of sulfur was injected into stratosphere, roughly equivalent to that of Tambora but three times more massive than the earlier 1452/53 eruption, based on the same set of sulfate records. In South Pole ice core, tephra was discovered in the sulfate layer, allowing geochemical matching to identify the source volcano of the sulfate spike if the tephra source was responsible for the sulfate spike.

In the year following the eruption, tree-rings formed in the Northern Hemisphere during the summer of 1459 registered a strong cooling of 1 °C (1.8 °F) followed by a cooling of 0.4 °C (0.72 °F) in 1460.

== Source of eruption ==
While the source volcano of the sulfur spike has not been definitely identified, several candidate volcanos have been proposed. The sulfate flux distribution in the ice cores suggests that the location of the source volcano is in the low latitudes of the Southern Hemisphere.

=== Kuwae caldera ===
In Tongoan folklore, the Kuwae caldera resulted from the catastrophic mid-fifteenth century volcanic eruption and disappearance of the Kuwae landmass. Its exact location, however, is debated. Two candidates are:

- a 6 by 12 km (3.7 by 7.5 mi) submarine caldera between the Epi and Tongoa islands
- south of Tongoa, the exposed part of the western rim marked by the islands of Tongoa, Ewose, Buninga and Tongariki

Regardless of the precise location, radiocarbon datings of thick pyroclastic flows on Tongoa cluster around 1410–1450 AD. Geochemical analysis of the magma determined its sulfur-rich nature and is capable of producing the greatest amount of sulfate in the last 700 years, if caldera volume equivalent amount of magma erupted.

Németh et al. (2007), however, questioned the proposed large magnitude and intensity of the eruption, noting that pyroclastic flow deposits on the surrounding islands are small-volume and lacking widespread fall deposits. Further evidence is needed to establish the relation between formation of large submarine caldera and the apparently small mid-fifteenth century eruption preserved on land. Furthermore, geochemistry of Kuwae magma does not match with that of the tephra discovered in 1458 sulfate layer.

As of early 2023, a new investigation led by volcanologists and anthropologists was ongoing to resolve the debate around the nature of Kuwae eruption and its climate consequence.

=== Tofua caldera ===
Németh et al. (2007), on the basis of a similar radiocarbon age, proposed the Tofua caldera as another candidate volcano for the 1458 sulfate spike. Unpublished radiocarbon data shows that there was a large Tofua eruption, which deposited more than 10 cm (3.9 in) of tephra over inhabited islands in Central Tonga around 1440–1640 AD.

=== Mount Reclus ===
The source of tephra occurred with 1458 sulfate layer in the Antarctica ice core has not been definitely identified. Based on geochemical correlation, the tephra is compositionally similar to the magma of the Reclus volcano. However, there is no known large eruption from the Reclus volcano during this period. Hence, it is hypothesized that an eruption of small magnitude but geographically close to the ice core might have created the sulfate spike through a tropospherically transported aerosol cloud. This, however, is inconsistent with the sulfur isotope evidence and widespread deposition of volcanic sulfate.

== Historical records ==
Historical records, largely from Europe and Eastern Asia, report multiple years in the 1450s to 1460s with anomalous weather patterns. Smog and haze were seen in the sky and multiple records describe the sun as being blue in color and volcanic ash raining from the sky. There were severe increases in precipitation and decreases in temperature. These weather and climate changes would be the result of a large aerosol cloud produced by a volcanic eruption spreading across the earth; however, medieval records of atmospheric phenomena are not always accurate.

== Climate implications ==
The weather patterns caused by this eruption had an impact on the life of people globally. Freezing temperatures and excessive rainfall led to famine and low quality crops. The number of people who starved to death increased over these years, and the decreased quality of wine during the time period was noted in historical records. Freezing temperatures and flooding also led to death and property damage. These factors put pressure on medieval governments and negatively impacted military efforts.

== See also ==
- 1808 mystery eruption
- Timeline of volcanism on Earth
- Year Without a Summer, caused by Mount Tambora's eruption in 1815
