= Port Havannah =

- Village
- Location in Vanuatu
- Coordinates: 17°34′8.4″S 168°15′36″E
- Country: Vanuatu
- Province: Shefa Province
- Island: Efate
- Time zone: UTC+11 (VUT)

Port Havannah, also known as Havannah Harbour or Havannah Bay, is a port village on Efate Island in Vanuatu. The United States Army and US Navy had a base there during World War II, established in May 1942, which included an airstrip and seaplane base. Today it has interesting dive and snorkelling sites.

== History ==
=== Name ===
The port was named after the 19th century Royal Navy vessel HMS Havannah, which travelled to the New Hebrides (now Vanauatu) in late 1850, and again as a missionary tour in May 1851.

=== Early geological survey ===
Between 1903 and 1905, one of the first major geological works of the region was produced by Australian geologist Sir Douglas Mawson. After spending from April to September 1903 exploring the islands with W.T. Quaife, Mawson produced a report which included the first geological maps of the island of Efate and of the south-west part of Santo. Mawson's detailed report, "The Geology of the New Hebrides", was published in the Proceedings of the Linnean Society of New South Wales in December 1905. Among other details, Mawson described and included cross-section drawings of the raised coral reefs and the coralliferous limestone terraces of Steep Gully in at Havannah Harbour. He also took photographs of geological features as well as taking extensive notes on the expedition, which are held in the Polar Collection of the South Australian Museum in Adelaide.

=== World War II ===
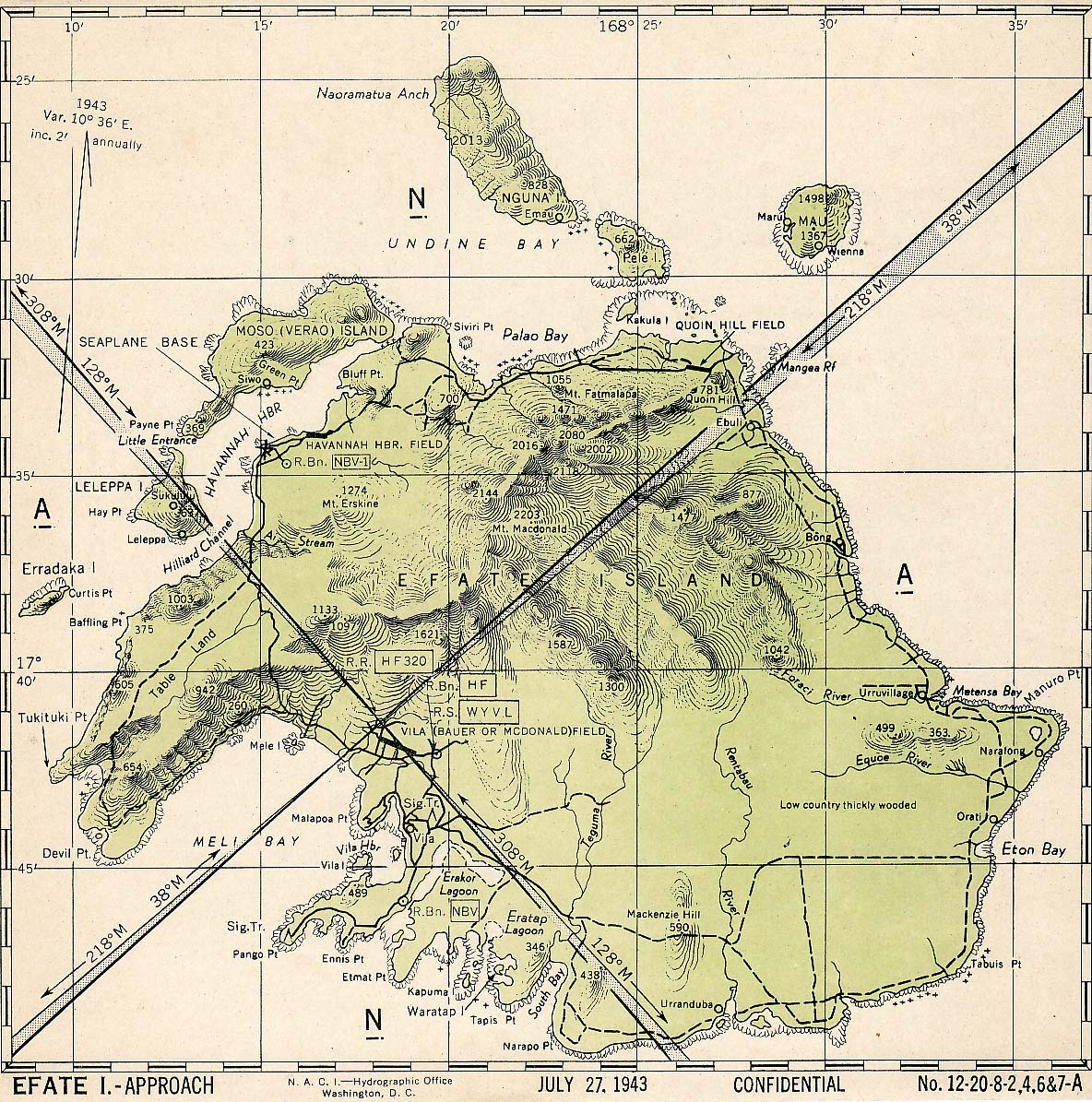
Map of Efate Island showing military installations 27 July 1943

With Japanese forces establishing bases on Guadalcanal which threatened the sea route between the U.S. and Australia, Admiral King distributed the joint basic plan for the occupation and defense of Efate on 20 March 1942. Under its terms the US Army was to defend Efate and support the defense of ships and positions. The US Navy's task was: (1) to construct, administer and operate a naval advance base, seaplane base, and harbor facilities; (2) to support Army forces in the defense of the island; (3) to construct an airfield and at least two outlying dispersal fields; (4) to provide facilities for the operation of seaplane-bombers.

On 25 March 1942, the Army sent about 500 men to Efate from Noumea, and the 4th Defense Battalion, 45th Marines, arrived on 8 April. Elements of the 1st Naval Construction Battalion arrived on Efate on 4 May 1942.

==== Seaplane base ====
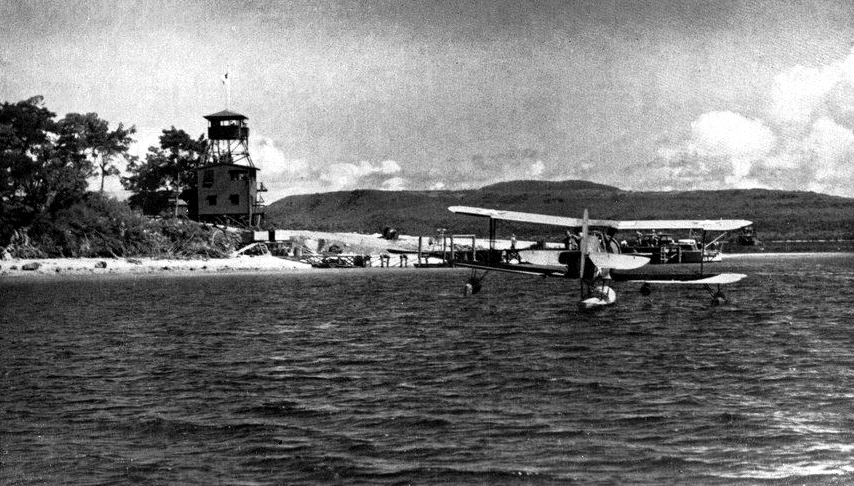
An SOC Seagull at Havannah Harbour Efate 1943

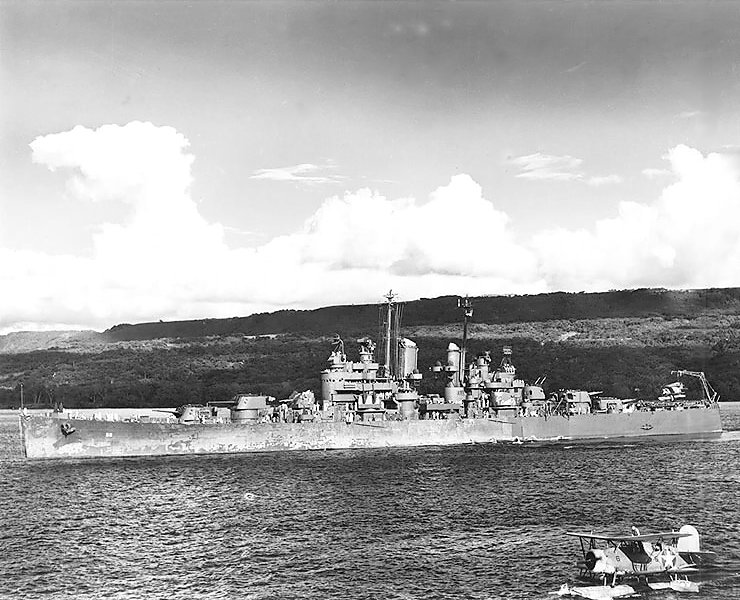
USS Denver (CL-58) enters Havannah Harbor on 22 April 1943

A detachment of Seebees went north to Havannah Harbour to construct a seaplane base to serve a squadron of PBYs. The Seabees built two seaplane ramps of coral, surfaced with wire mesh, and provided buoys for mooring 14 seaplanes. By 1 June, the PBYs began operating from the new base, bombing the Japanese positions on Guadalcanal. In addition to the ramps and moorings, two small piers, two nose hangars, one 40 feet (12 m) by 100 feet (30 m) seaplane workshop, four 5,000-gallon underground gasoline tanks, and housing facilities for 25 officers and 210 men in quonset huts were constructed.

US Navy units based at the base included VP-71 operating PBYs, from 29 June to 20 July 1942.

The seaplane SON-1 Seagull, Bureau Number 1184, crashed into the harbour on 16 June 1943, with both pilots rescued.

==== Havannah Harbour Field ====
In late 1942 the Seebees constructed a 3,000 feet (910 m) by 180 feet (55 m) fighter airstrip at Port Havannah.

== Geography and tourism ==
Havannah Harbour, also known as Port Havannah or Havannah Bay, is located on the northwest coast of Efate Island to the south. It is opposite the islands of Moso to the north and Lelepa to the west. Matapu Bay is on the eastern side, Little Entrance is to the west, and Hilliard Channel on the southwest.

=== Diving ===
Scuba diving and snorkelling are a popular pastimes for tourists, having shallow reefs as well as deep underwater canyons. The water is clear and marine life abundant.

The wreck of the seaplane SON-1 Seagull remains a dive site.

== See also ==
- Bauerfield International Airport
- Quoin Hill Airfield
