= Tefala (Vanuatu) =

Uninhabited island in the country of Vanuatu

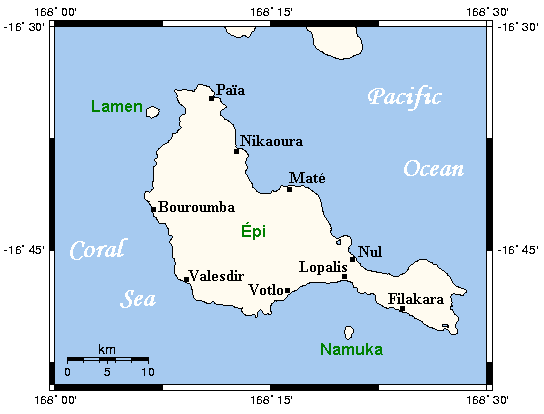

Geography
- Location: Pacific Ocean
- Coordinates: 16°48′57″S 168°32′42″E
- Archipelago: Vanuatu

Administration
- Vanuatu
- Province: Shefa Province

Demographics
- Population: 0 (2015)
- Ethnic groups: None

Tefala (Ile Tevala, Téfala, Île Tévala) is a small uninhabited island in the Pacific Ocean, belonging to the Shefa Province of Vanuatu.

== Geography ==
The island lies 2.6 km north-west of the small island of Laika, 9.4 km north of the island of Tongoa, and east of Epi.

== Geology ==
Tefala and other small islands scattered around Tongoa (Laika, Sail Rock) were once a part of a larger landmass formed by the eruptions of the submarine volcano of Kuwae in the second half of the 15th century. The volcanic arc, called the New Hebrides arc, is home to a number of more famous volcanoes, such as Yasur, Gaua, and Ambrym.
