= Volcanic winter =

Temperature anomaly event caused by a volcanic eruption

The conversion of sulfur dioxide to sulfuric acid, which condenses rapidly in the stratosphere to form fine sulfate aerosols.

A volcanic winter is a reduction in global temperatures caused by droplets of sulfuric acid obscuring the Sun and raising Earth's albedo (increasing the reflection of solar radiation) after a large, sulfur-rich, particularly explosive volcanic eruption. Climate effects are primarily dependent upon the amount of injection of SO_{2} and H_{2}S into the stratosphere where they react with OH and H_{2}O to form H_{2}SO_{4} on a timescale of a week, and the resulting H_{2}SO_{4} aerosols produce the dominant radiative effect. Volcanic stratospheric aerosols cool the surface by reflecting solar radiation and warm the stratosphere by absorbing terrestrial radiation for several years. Moreover, the cooling trend can be further extended by atmosphere–ice–ocean feedback mechanisms. These feedbacks can continue to maintain the cool climate long after the volcanic aerosols have dissipated.

== Physical process ==
An explosive volcanic eruption releases magma materials in the form of volcanic ash and gases into the atmosphere. While most volcanic ash settles to the ground within a few weeks after the eruption, impacting only the local area for a short duration, the emitted SO_{2} can lead to the formation of H_{2}SO_{4} aerosols in the stratosphere. These aerosols can circle the hemisphere of the eruption source in a matter of weeks and persist with an e-folding decay time of about a year. As a result, they have a radiative impact that can last for several years.

The subsequent dispersal of a volcanic cloud in the stratosphere and its impact on climate are strongly influenced by several factors, including the season of the eruption, the latitude of the source volcano, and the injection height. If the SO_{2} injection height remains confined to the troposphere, the resulting H_{2}SO_{4} aerosols have a residence time of only a few days due to efficient removal through precipitation. The lifetime of H_{2}SO_{4} aerosols resulting from extratropical eruptions is shorter compared to those from tropical eruptions, due to a longer transport path from the tropics to removal across the mid- or high-latitude tropopause, but extratropical eruptions strengthens the hemispheric climate impact by confining the aerosol to a single hemisphere. Injections in the winter are also much less radiatively efficient than injections during the summer for high-latitude volcanic eruptions, when the removal of stratospheric aerosols in polar regions is enhanced.

The sulfate aerosol interacts strongly with solar radiation through scattering, giving rise to remarkable atmospheric optical phenomena in the stratosphere. These phenomena include solar dimming, coronae or Bishop's rings, peculiar twilight coloration, and dark total lunar eclipses. Historical records that documented these atmospheric events are indications of volcanic winters and date back to periods preceding the Common Era.

Surface temperature observations following historic eruptions show that there is no correlation between eruption size, as represented by the VEI or eruption volume, and the severity of the climate cooling. This is because eruption size does not correlate with the amount of SO_{2} emitted.

=== Long-term positive feedback ===
It has been proposed that the cooling effects of volcanic eruptions can extend beyond the initial several years, lasting for decades to possibly even millennia. This prolonged impact is hypothesized to be a result of positive feedback mechanisms involving ice and ocean dynamics, even after the H_{2}SO_{4} aerosols have dissipated.

During the first few years following a volcanic eruption, the presence of H_{2}SO_{4} aerosols can induce a significant cooling effect. This cooling can lead to a widespread lowering of snowline, enabling the rapid expansion of sea ice, ice caps and continental glacier. As a result, ocean temperatures decrease, and surface albedo increases, further reinforcing the expansion of sea ice, ice caps, and glacier. These processes create a strong positive feedback loop, allowing the cooling trend to persist over centennial-scale or even longer periods of time.

It has been proposed that a cluster of closely spaced, large volcanic eruptions triggered or amplified the Little Ice Age, Late Antique Little Ice Age, stadials, Younger Dryas, Heinrich events, and Dansgaard-Oeschger events through the atmosphere-ice-ocean positive feedbacks.

=== Weathering effects ===
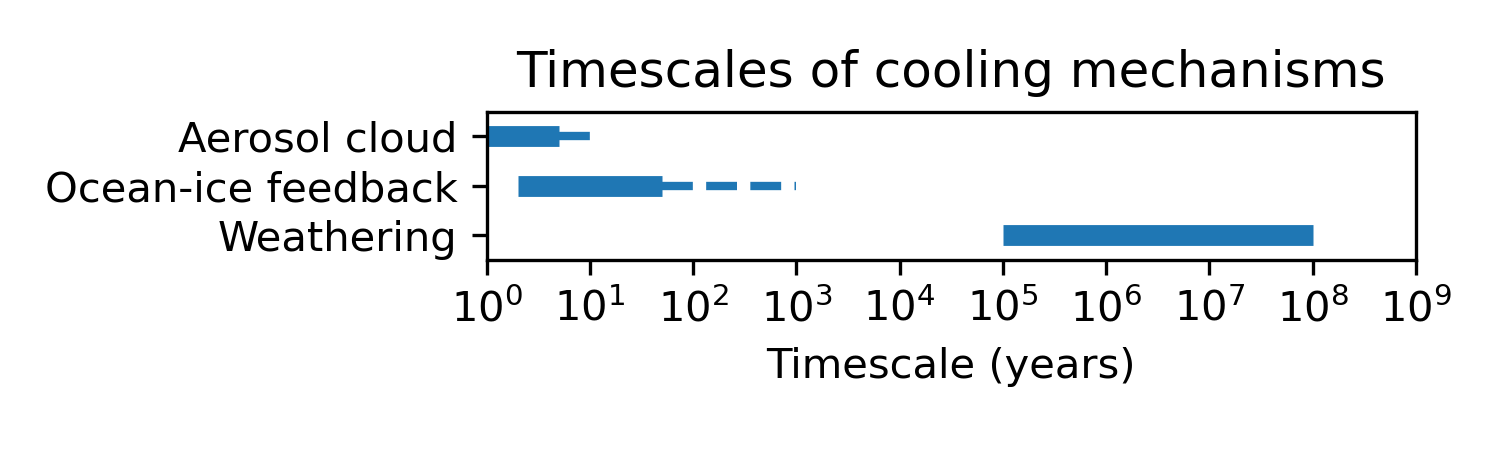
Timescales of various volcanic cooling mechanisms on climate

The weathering of a sufficiently large volume of rapidly erupted volcanic materials has been proposed as an important factor in Earth's silicate weathering cycle, which operates on a timescale of tens of millions of years. During this process, weathered silicate minerals react with carbon dioxide and water, resulting in the formation of magnesium carbonate and calcium carbonate. These carbonates represent a removal of carbon dioxide from the atmosphere and its sequestration on the ocean floor. The eruption of a large volume of volcanic materials can enhance weathering processes, thereby lowering atmospheric CO_{2} levels and contributing to global temperature reduction.

The rapid emplacement of mafic large igneous provinces has the potential to cause a swift decline in atmospheric CO_{2} content, leading to a multi-million-year-long icehouse climate. A notable example is the Sturtian glaciation, (Note: The Sturtian glaciation is controversially referred to as "Snowball Earth.") which is considered the most severe and widespread known glacial event in Earth's history. This glaciation is believed to have been caused by the weathering of erupted Franklin Large Igneous Province.

== Past volcanic coolings ==
Tree-ring-based temperature reconstructions, historical records of dust veils, and ice cores studies have confirmed that some of the coldest years during the last five millennia were directly caused by massive volcanic injections of SO_{2}.

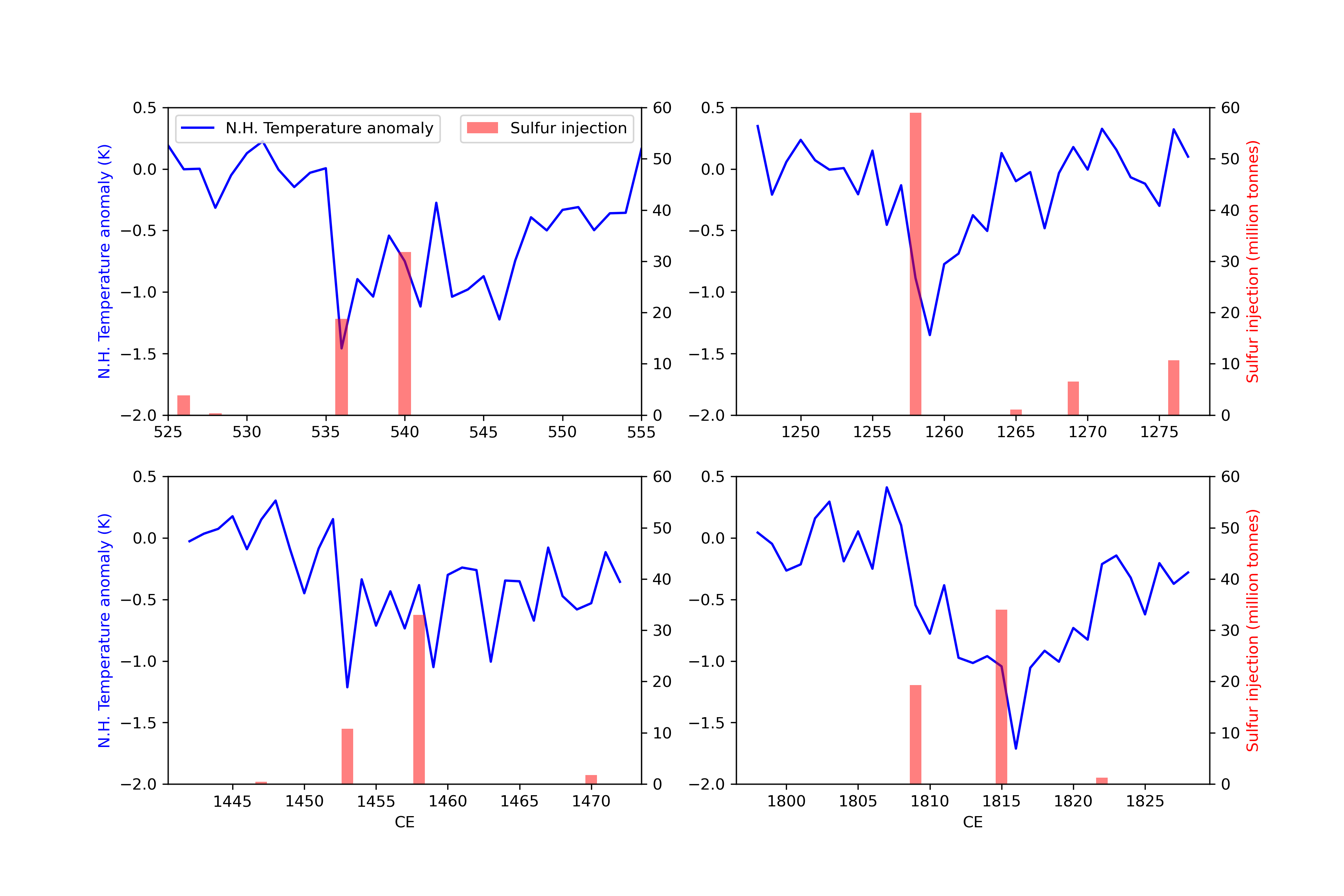
Northern Hemisphere coolings are observed following major volcanic eruptions, and temperatures are reconstructed from tree-ring data.

Hemispheric temperature anomalies resulting from volcanic eruptions have primarily been reconstructed based on tree-ring data for the past two millennia. (Note: Each reconstruction resul-s different magnitudes of volcanic coolings) For earlier periods in the Holocene, the identification of frost rings that coincide with large ice core sulfate spikes serves as an indicator of severe volcanic winters. (Note: Frost damage implies a rare occurrence of temperatures dropping below freezing during the growing season.) The quantification of volcanic coolings further back in time during the Last Glacial Period is made possible by annually resolved δ^{18}O records. (Note: δ^{18}O record is proxy of local temperatures.) This is a non-exhaustive compilation of notable and consequential coolings that have been definitively attributed to volcanic aerosols, although the source volcanos of the aerosols are rarely identified.

Northern Hemisphere cooling episodes definitively attributed to volcanic eruptions
Cooling episode (CE/BCE)	Volcanic eruptions	N.H. peak temperature anomaly	Notes	Ref.
1991–1993	1991 eruption of Mount Pinatubo	−0.5 K		
1883–1886	1883 eruption of Krakatoa	−0.3 K		
1809–1820	1808 mystery eruptions, 1815 eruption of Mount Tambora	−1.7 K	Year Without a Summer	
1453–1460	1452 N.H. mystery eruption, 1458 S.H. mystery eruption	−1.2 K	The attribution of the 1458 eruption to Kuwae Caldera remains controversial.	
1258–1260	1257 Samalas eruption	−1.3 K	The single largest sulfur injection of the Common Era.	
536–546	535 N.H. mystery eruptions, 540 tropical mystery eruption	−1.4 K	The first phase of Late Antique Little Ice Age.	
−43–41	Okmok II	−2–3 K		

During the Last Glacial Period, volcanic coolings comparable to the largest volcanic coolings during the Common Era (e.g. Tambora, Samalas) are inferred based on the magnitudes of δ^{18}O anomalies. In particular, in the period 12,000–32,000 years ago, the peak δ^{18}O cooling anomaly of the eruptions exceeds the anomaly after the largest eruptions in the Common Era. One Last Glacial Period eruption that have gained significant attention is the eruption of the Youngest Toba Tuff (YTT), which has sparked vigorous debates regarding its climate effects.

=== Youngest Toba Tuff ===
The eruption of YTT from Toba Caldera, 74,000 years ago, is regarded as the largest known Quaternary eruption and two orders of magnitude greater than the magma volume of the largest historical eruption, Tambora. The exceptional magnitude of this eruption has prompted sustained debate as to its global and regional impact on climate.

Sulfate concentration and isotope measurements from polar ice cores taken around the time of 74,000 years BP have identified four atmospheric aerosol events that could potentially be attributed to YTT. The calculated stratospheric sulfate loadings for these four events range from 219 to 535 million tonnes, which is 1 to 3 times greater than that of the Samalas eruption in 1257 CE. Global climate models simulate peak global mean cooling of 2.3 to 4.1 K for this amount of erupted sulfate aerosols, and complete temperature recovery does not occur within 10 years.

Empirical evidence for cooling induced by YTT, however, is mixed. YTT coincides with the onset of Greenland Stadial 20 (GS-20), which is characterized by a 1,500-year cooling period. GS-20 is considered the most isotopically extreme and coldest stadial, as well as having the weakest Asian monsoon, in the last 100,000 years. This timing has led some to speculate on the relation between YTT and GS-20. The stratigraphic position of YTT in relation to the GS-20 transition suggests that the stadial would have occurred without YTT, as the cooling was already underway. There is the possibility that YTT contributed to the extremity of GS-20. The South China Sea shows a 1 K cooling over 1,000 years following the deposition of YTT, while the Arabian Sea shows no discernible impact. In India and the Bay of Bengal, initial cooling and prolonged desiccation are observed above the YTT ash layer, but it is argued that these environmental changes were already occurring prior to YTT. Lake Malawi sediments do not provide evidence supporting a volcanic winter within a few years after the eruption of YTT, but the resolution of the sediments is questioned due to sediment mixing. Directly above the YTT layer in Lake Malawi, there is evidence of a 2,000-year-long megadrought and cooling period. Greenland ice cores identify a 110-year period of accelerated cooling immediately following what is likely the YTT aerosol event.

=== Sturtian glaciation ===
The enhanced weathering of continental flood basalts, which erupted just prior to the onset of the Sturtian glaciation at 717 million years ago, is recognized as the trigger for the most severe glaciation in Earth's history. During this period, Earth's surface temperatures dropped below the freezing point of water everywhere, and ice rapidly advanced from low latitudes to the equator, covering a worldwide extent. This glaciation lasted almost 60 million years, from 717 to 659 million years ago.

Geochronology dates the rapid emplacement of 5,000,000 km^{2} (1,900,000 mi^{2}) Franklin large igneous province just 1 million year before the onset of Sturtian glaciation. Multiple large igneous provinces on the scale of 1,000,000 km^{2} (390,000 mi^{2}) were also emplaced on Rodinia between 850 and 720 million years ago. Weathering of massive amount of fresh mafic materials initiated runaway cooling and ice-albedo feedback after 1 million year. Chemical isotopic compositions show a massive flux of weathered freshly erupted materials entering the ocean, coinciding with the eruptions of large igneous provinces. Simulations demonstrate that the increased weatherability led to drop in atmospheric CO_{2} of the order of 1,320 ppm and an 8 K cooling of global temperatures, triggering the most extraordinary episode of climate change in the geologic record.

== Effects on life ==
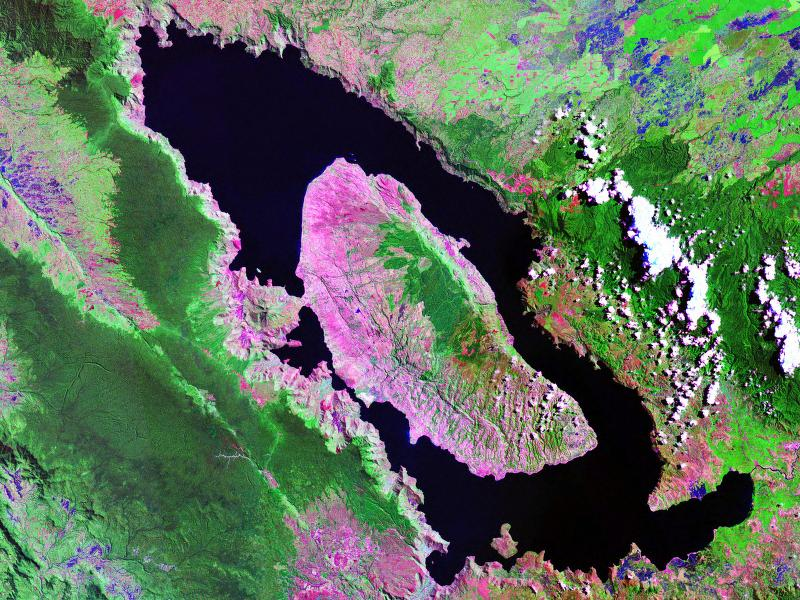
The supervolcano caldera Lake Toba

Population bottlenecks—a sharp decrease in the population of a species population—have been attributed to volcanic winters by some researchers. Such events may diminish populations to "levels low enough for evolutionary changes, which occur much faster in small populations, to produce rapid population differentiation". With the Lake Toba bottleneck, many species showed the massive genetic effects of this decrease in the gene pool; Toba may have reduced the human population to between 15,000 and 40,000, or even fewer.

== See also ==
- Global dimming
- Impact winter
- List of famines
- Nuclear winter
- Timeline of volcanism on Earth
