= Lamen (island) =

Island in Vanuatu

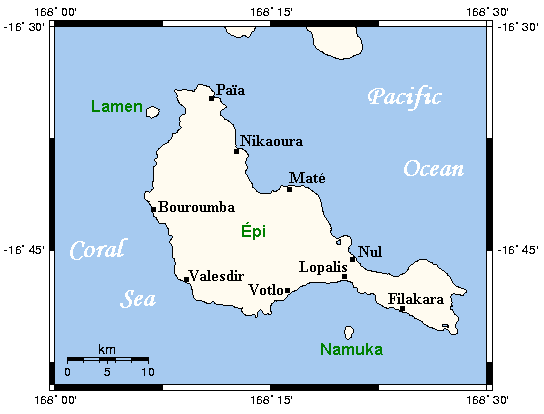

Geography
- Location: Pacific Ocean
- Coordinates: 16°36′S 168°9′E
- Archipelago: Vanuatu, Shepherd Islands
- Highest elevation: 34 m (112 ft)

Administration
- Vanuatu
- Province: Shefa Province

Demographics
- Population: 459 (2015)

Lamen is an inhabited island in Shefa Province of Vanuatu in the Pacific Ocean. The island is a part of Shepherd Islands archipelago.

== Geography ==
Lamen lies 1 km west of the Epi Island. Lamen spans 1.6 km from the north to the south and 1.2 km from the east to the west. The island is flat; its estimated terrain elevation above the sea level is some 34 metres.

== Population ==
As of 2015, the official local population was 459 people in 93 households. Some local people speak Lamenu language.

== Language ==
The Lamen language is spoken on the island.
