= Ekapum Lep =

Island in Vanuatu

- Interactive map of Ekapum Lep

Geography
- Location: Pacific Ocean
- Coordinates: 17°48′20″S 168°19′50″E
- Archipelago: Vanuatu, Shepherd Islands
- Highest elevation: 10 m (30 ft)

Administration
- Vanuatu
- Province: Shefa Province

Demographics
- Population: 0 (2015)

Ekapum Lep is a small uninhabited island in the Pacific Ocean, a part of the Shefa Province of Vanuatu.

== Geography ==
The island lies 8 km south of Port-Vila.
