= Erueti Lep =

Island in Vanuatu

- Interactive map of Erueti Lep

Geography
- Location: Pacific Ocean
- Coordinates: 17°49′00″S 168°27′00″E
- Archipelago: Vanuatu, Shepherd Islands
- Highest elevation: 10 m (30 ft)

Administration
- Vanuatu
- Province: Shefa Province

Demographics
- Population: 0 (2015)

Erueti Lep (also Îlot Erouéti, Éruéti) is a small uninhabited island in the Pacific Ocean, a part of the Shefa Province of Vanuatu.

== Geography ==
The island lies 16 km south of Port-Vila in Efate Island. The estimated terrain elevation above the sea level is some 10 meters
