= Falea (island) =

Island in the Pacific Ocean, part of Vanuatu

- Interactive map of Falea

Geography
- Location: Pacific Ocean
- Coordinates: 17°00′S 168°36′E
- Archipelago: Vanuatu
- Highest point: 100 m

Administration
- Vanuatu
- Province: Shefa Province

Demographics
- Population: 0 (2015)
- Ethnic groups: None

Falea (also Valea) is a small uninhabited island in the Pacific Ocean, a part of the Shepherd Islands archipelago in the Shefa Province of Vanuatu.

== Geography ==
The island, located 1.8 km north-west of the island of Tongariki, measures 1 km in length and 250 m in width. The maximum elevation is about 100 meters above the sea level.
