= TGH =

TGH may stand for:

- Tampa General Hospital, Florida, US
- Textainer Group Holdings, Bermuda, NYSE symbol
- Toronto General Hospital
- the IATA airport code for Tongoa Airport, Vanuatu
- the ISO 639-3 language code for Tobagonian Creole
