= Eratap =

Island in Vanuatu

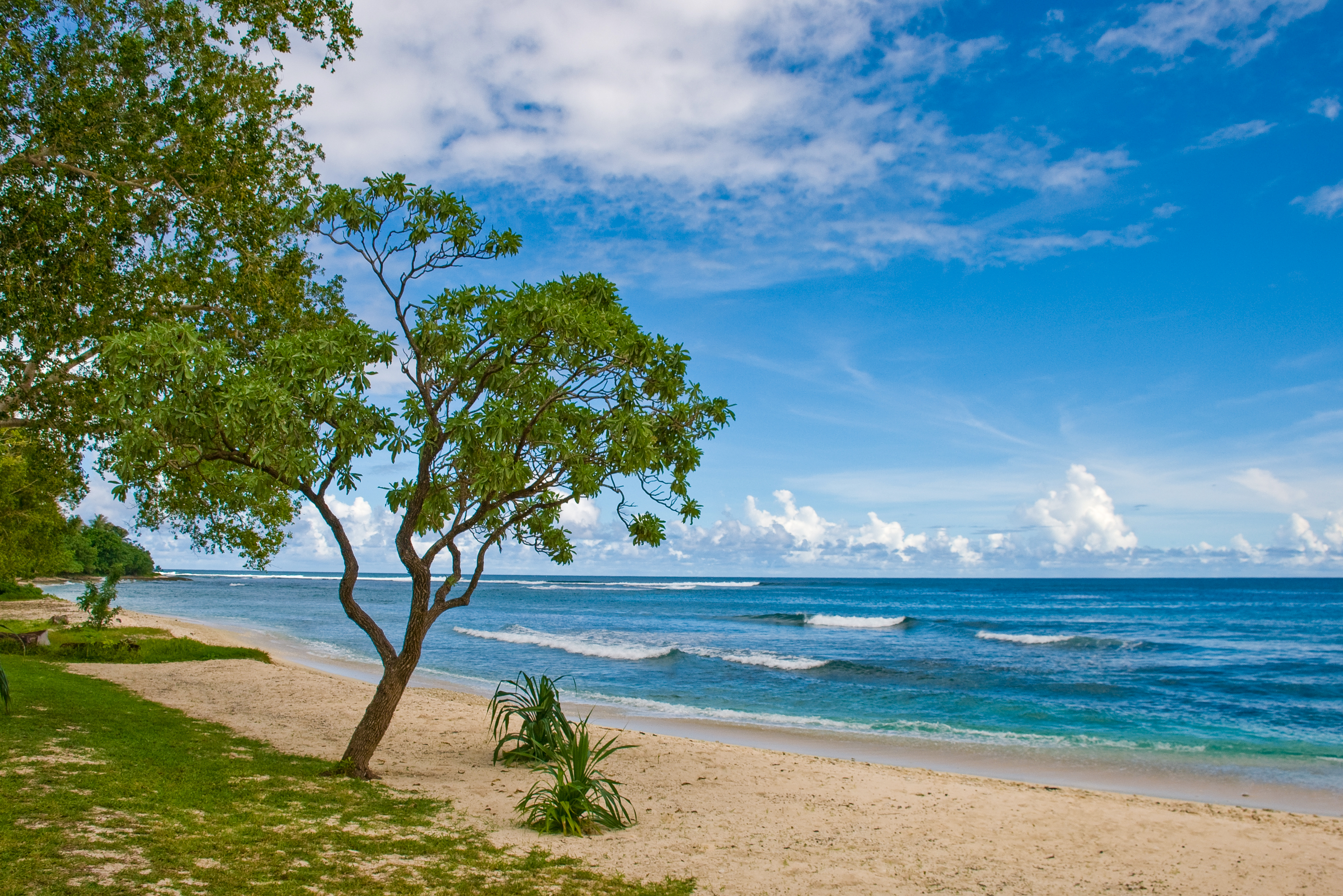
- Eratap beach, Efate in 2008.
- Interactive map of Eratap

Geography
- Location: Pacific Ocean
- Coordinates: 17°47′56.8″S 168°20′20.3″E
- Archipelago: Vanuatu, Shepherd Islands
- Highest elevation: 10 m (30 ft)

Administration
- Vanuatu
- Province: Shefa Province

Demographics
- Population: 0 (2015)

Eratap (also Waratap Island, Îlot Ératap, Castaway Island) is a small uninhabited island in the Pacific Ocean, a part of the Shefa Province of Vanuatu.

== Geography ==
The island lies 7 km south of Port-Vila and has an upscale resort. The estimated terrain elevation above the sea level is some 10 meters
