= Namuka =

Island in Vanuatu

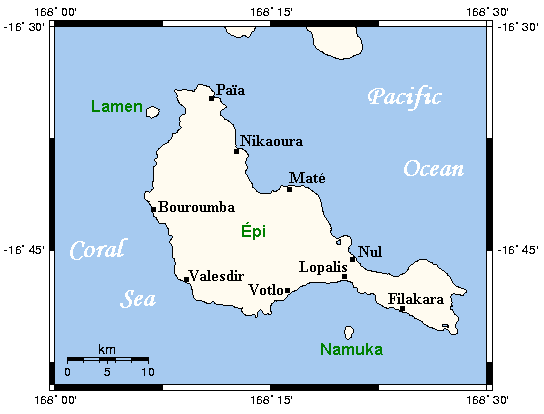

Geography
- Location: Pacific Ocean
- Coordinates: 16°50′S 168°22′E
- Archipelago: Vanuatu, Shepherd Islands

Administration
- Vanuatu
- Province: Shefa Province

Demographics
- Population: 0 (2015)
- Ethnic groups: None

Namuka is an uninhabited islet in Shefa Province of Vanuatu in the Pacific Ocean. The island is a part of Shepherd Islands archipelago.

== Geography ==
Namuka lies off the southern shore of Epi Island and has white-sand beaches and a fringing coral reef.
