= Wot Island =

Island in Vanuatu

Wot Rock Monument Rock
Native name: Étarik Îlot Wot
- Location in Vanuatu

Geography
- Location: Pacific Ocean
- Coordinates: 17°16′01″S 168°27′48″E
- Archipelago: Vanuatu

Administration
- Vanuatu
- Province: Shefa Province

Demographics
- Population: 0 (2015)
- Ethnic groups: None

Wot Rock ( Étarik or Monument Rock ) is a small uninhabited islet in the Pacific Ocean, a part of the Shepherd Islands archipelago in the Shefa Province of Vanuatu. Wot is located close to Emae Island.
