= Laika (island) =

Uninhabited island in Vanuatu

- Interactive map of Laika

Geography
- Location: Pacific Ocean
- Coordinates: 16°49′38″S 168°33′39″E
- Archipelago: Vanuatu, Shepherd Islands
- Area: 1.0 km^{2} (0.39 sq mi)

Administration
- Vanuatu
- Province: Shefa Province

Demographics
- Population: 0 (2015)
- Ethnic groups: None

Laika or Laïka is a small uninhabited island in the Pacific Ocean, a part of the Shepherd Islands archipelago in the Shefa Province of Vanuatu.

== Geography ==
Laika is located 7.4 km (4.6 mi) north of the island of Tongoa and 2.6 km (1.6 mi) south-east of the islet of Tefala. Laika and the other islands scattered around Tongoa were once part of a larger land mass, formed by the eruptions of the Kuwae submarine volcano, which exploded around 1475. Laika has an area of about one km^{2} (0.39 sq mi).
