= Roi Mata =

Melanesian chief

Chief Roi Mata’s Domain
UNESCO World Heritage Site
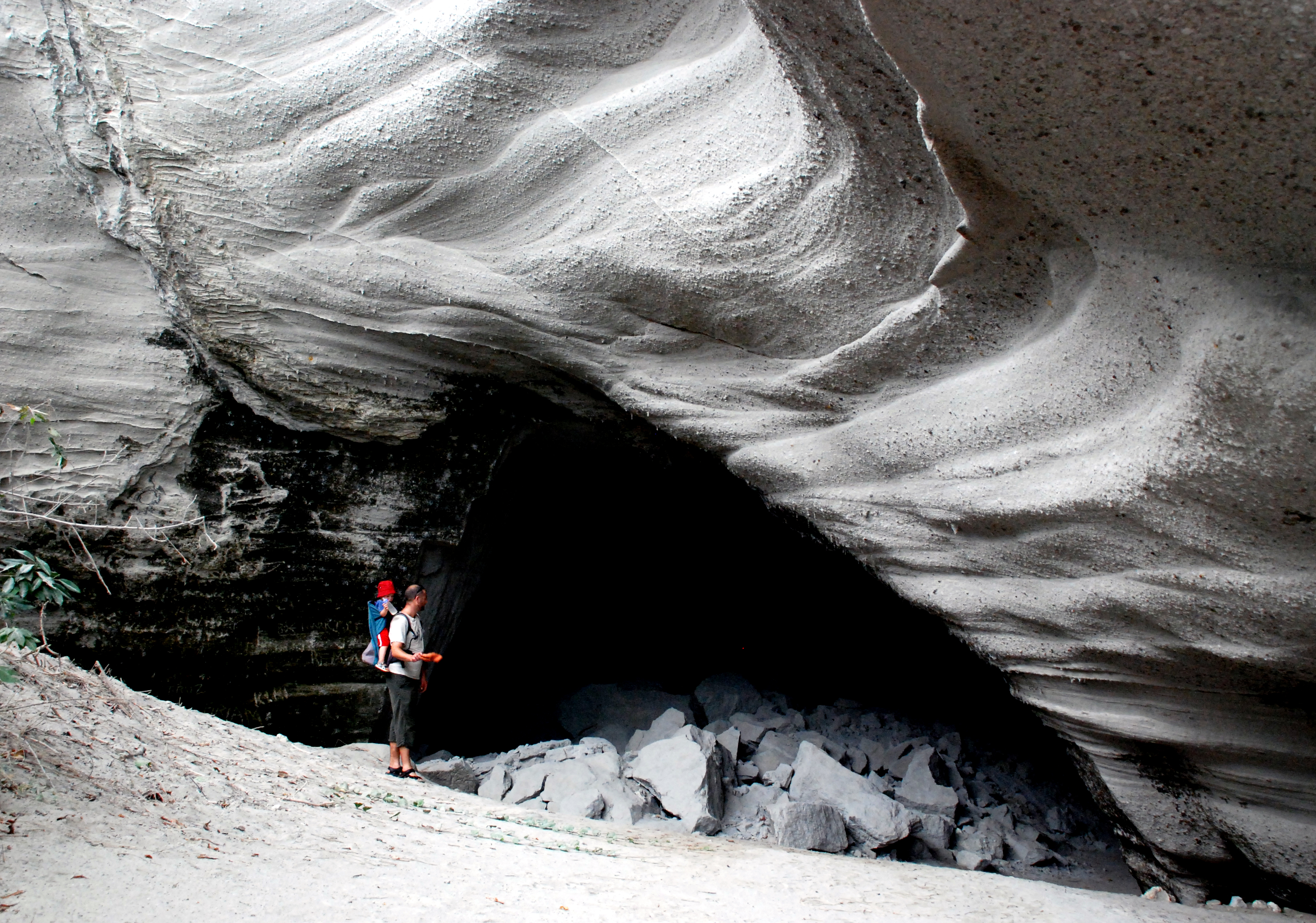
- Fels Cave on Lelepa Island

- Location within Vanuatu Location within Oceania
- Location: Vanuatu
- Criteria: Cultural: (iii)(v)(vi)
- Reference: 1280
- Inscription: 2008 (32nd Session)
- Area: 886.31 ha (2,190.1 acres)
- Buffer zone: 1,275.42 ha (3,151.6 acres)
- Coordinates: 17°37′41.05″S 168°10′39.79″E

Roi Mata (or Roy Mata, Roymata) was a chiefly title in the central islands of Vanuatu. It was borne by a long dynasty of chiefs, from the 11th to the 17th century.

Among the bearers of the Roi Mata title, the most famous is the last one, a man believed to have lived around year 1600. That chief is often designated as "Roi Mata", with no formal distinction from its predecessors — a source of potential confusion.

In 2008, three sites associated with Roi Mata, on the islands of Efate, Lelepa and Eretoka, were made UNESCO World Heritage Sites, including Roi Mata’s residence, the site of his death and Roi Mata’s mass burial site.

== Roi Mata's grave ==
Roi Mata's elaborate grave, containing the bodies of over 25 members of his retinue, was discovered by French archaeologist José Garanger in 1967 and inscribed on the World Heritage List in 2008. Garanger was able to locate the grave on Eretoka island by analyzing local folklore. According to legend, when Roi Mata conquered the land, his first goal was to unite the tribes to form an army.

His reign is reputed to have been a peaceful one. Roi Mata was fatally poisoned by his brother. His body was not buried in his homeland and his name was not used in future generations because the locals feared his spirit.

Map of Chief Roi Mata's domain

== Gallery ==
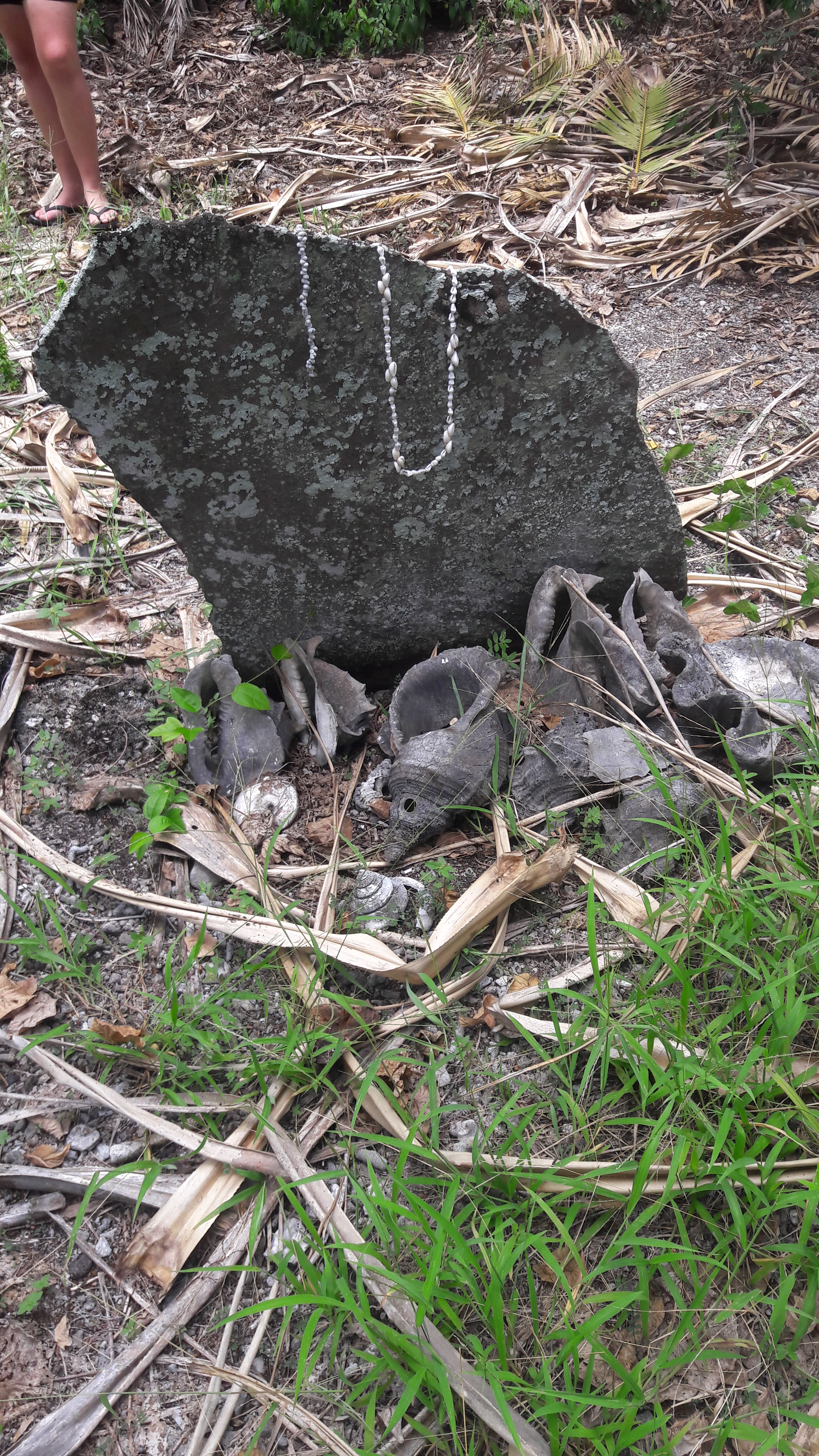
Chief Roi mata's grave (Eratoka Island, 8 January 2017)

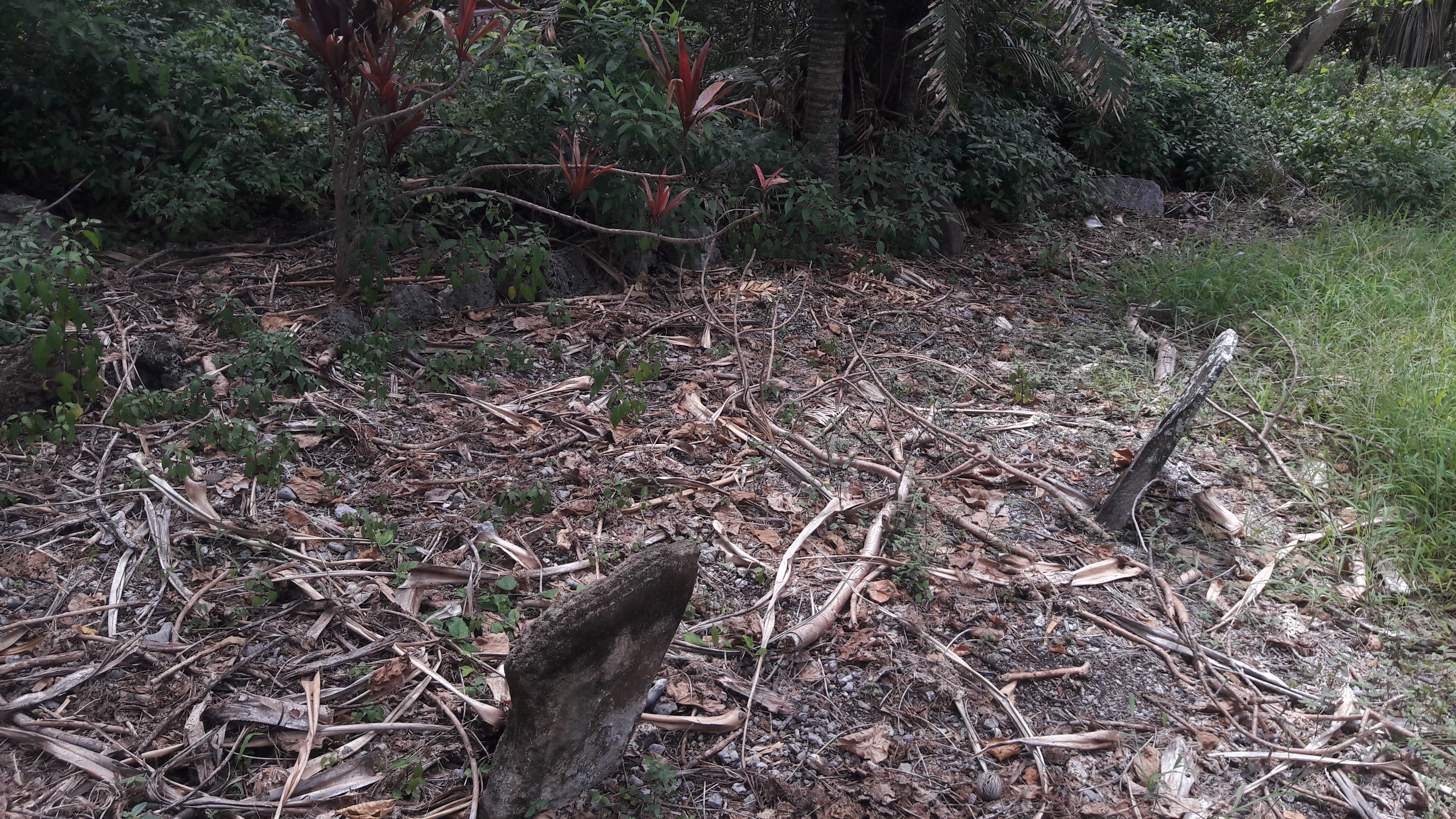
Grave markers of Chief Roi mata's wives (Eratoka Island, 8 January 2017)

== Notes and references ==
=== References ===
- Chris Ballard; Meredith Wilson (2008). Chief Roi Mata's Domain (PDF) (Nomination by the Republic of Vanuatu for Inscription on the World Heritage List).
- Bessis, Sandrine (2023). Souvenir des ancêtres et histoire orale au Vanuatu. Les récits de chefferies anciennes aux îles Shepherd (PhD dissertation in linguistics). Univ. Sorbonne, Paris. p. 1027.

=== External links ===
- "Roy Mata", Encyclopædia Britannica
