= Emao =

Island in Vanuatu

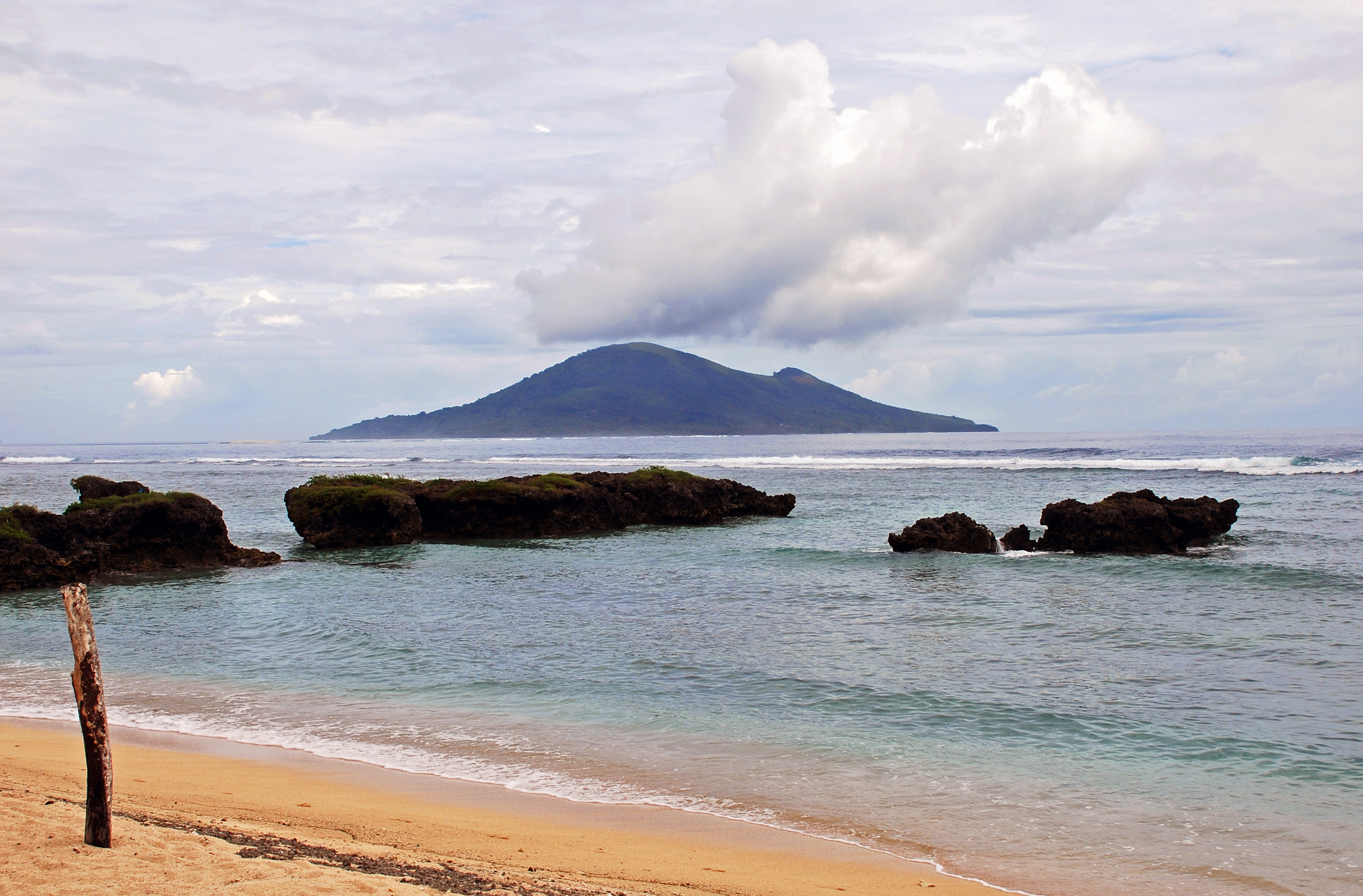
- A view of Emao Island from Matarisu (2006).

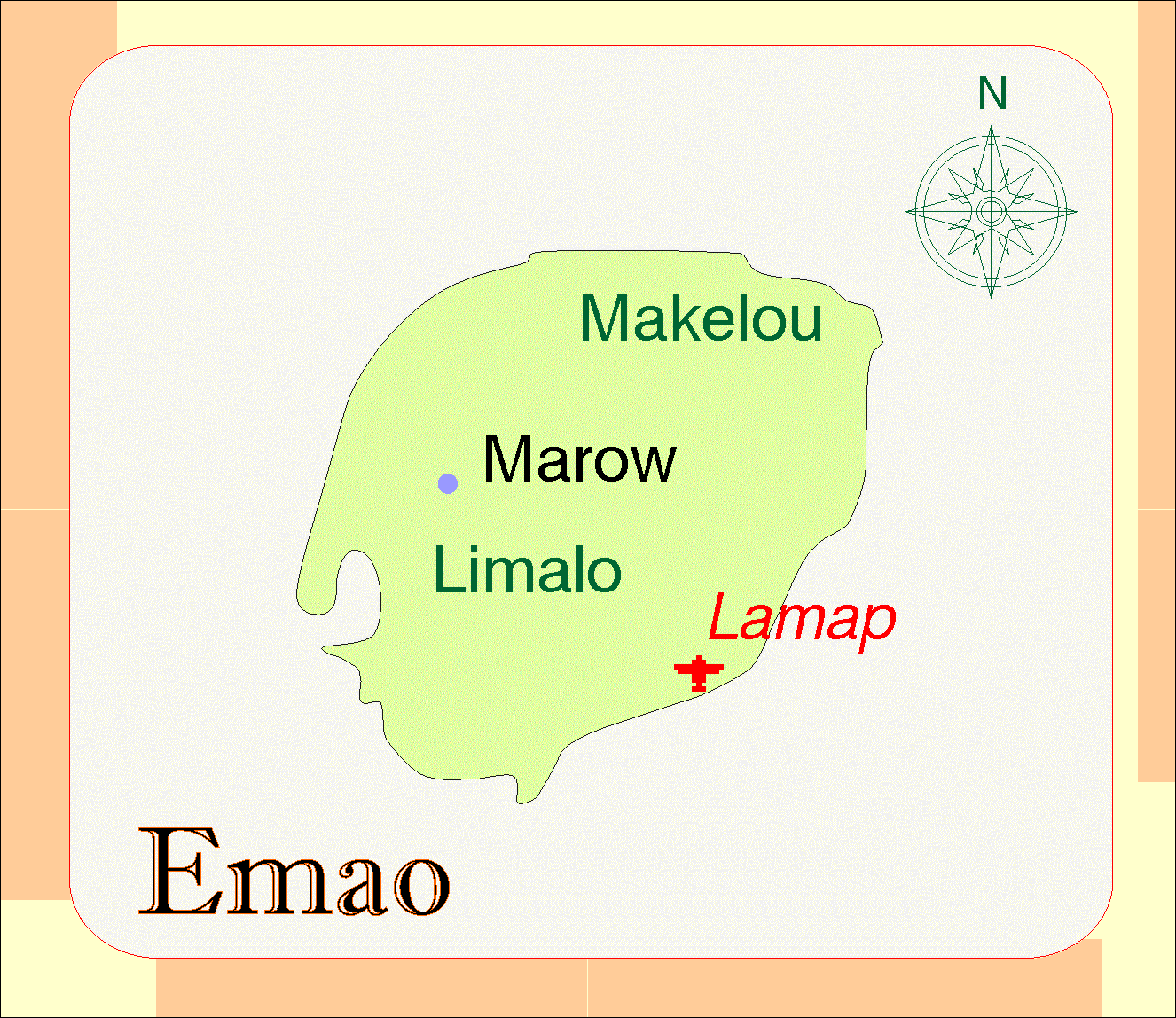

Geography
- Location: Pacific Ocean
- Coordinates: 17°29′00″S 168°29′00″E
- Archipelago: Vanuatu
- Area: 8.1 km^{2} (3.1 sq mi)
- Highest elevation: 278 m (912 ft)

Administration
- Vanuatu
- Province: Shefa Province

Demographics
- Population: 488 (2015)

Emao is a small inhabited island in Shefa Province of Vanuatu in the Pacific Ocean. It was also previously known as Montague Island.

== Geography ==
Emao is located in the southeastern part of the country, some 30 km north-east of Port-Vila. The island covers an area of 8.1 square kilometers. The land of Emao Island is quite a hill. The highest point on the island is 427 meters above sea level. It covers 3.3 km from the north to the south and 3.6 km from the east to the west. The estimated terrain elevation above sea level is some 278 metres.

== Population ==
As of 2015, the official local population was 488 people in 99 households.
