= Lamen language =

Austronesian language spoken in Vanuatu

Lamen
- Lamenu, Varmali
- Native to: Vanuatu
- Region: Epi Island (incl. Lamen Island)
- Native speakers: (850 cited 2001)
- Language family: Austronesian: Malayo-Polynesian; Oceanic; Southern Oceanic; North-Central Vanuatu; Central Vanuatu; Epi-Efate; Epi; Lamen

Language codes
- ISO 639-3: lmu
- Glottolog: lame1260
- ELP: Lamen
- Lamen is not endangered according to the classification system of the UNESCO Atlas of the World's Languages in Danger

Lamen (Lamenu, Varmali) is an Oceanic language spoken on Epi Island, in Vanuatu.
