= Tongoa Airport =

Airport in Vanuatu

- IATA: TGH; ICAO: NVST

Summary
- Airport type: Public
- Serves: Tongoa, Shefa Province, Vanuatu
- Elevation AMSL: 443 ft / 135 m
- Coordinates: 16°53′28″S 168°33′04″E

Map
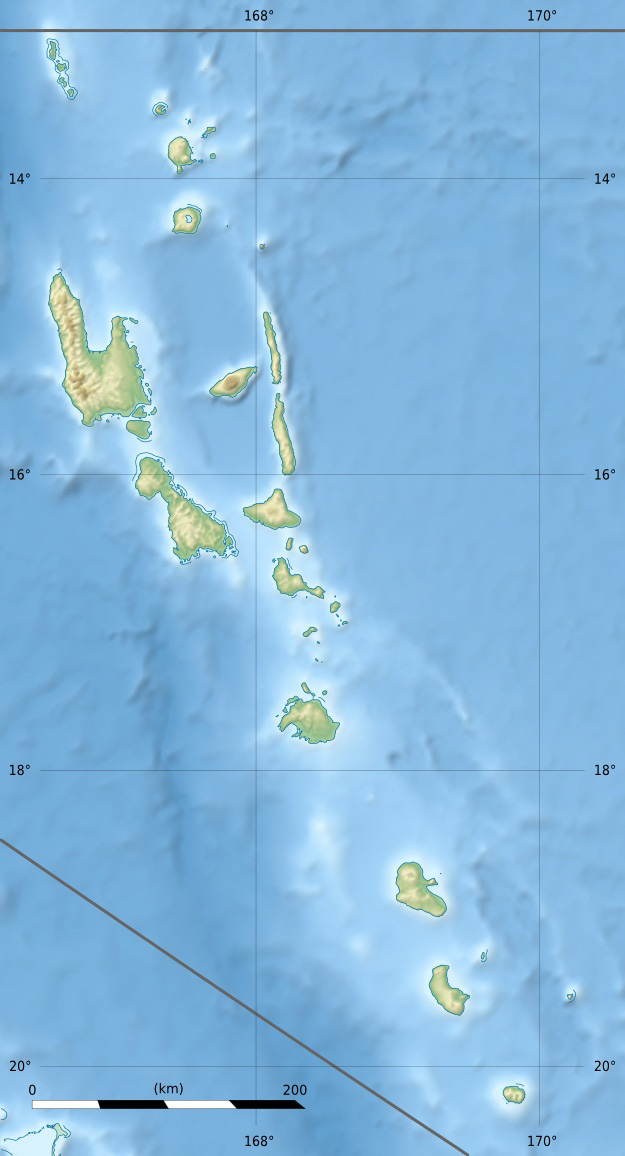
- Location of airport in Vanuatu

Runways
| Direction | Length | | Surface |
| Direction | m | ft | Surface |
|---|---|---|---|
| | 610 | 2,001 |
- Source: GCM, STV

Tongoa Airport (IATA: TGH, ICAO: NVST) is an airport in serving the Tongoa island, located in the Shefa Province of Vanuatu.
