= Eretoka =

Island of Vanuatu

[name]: Artok
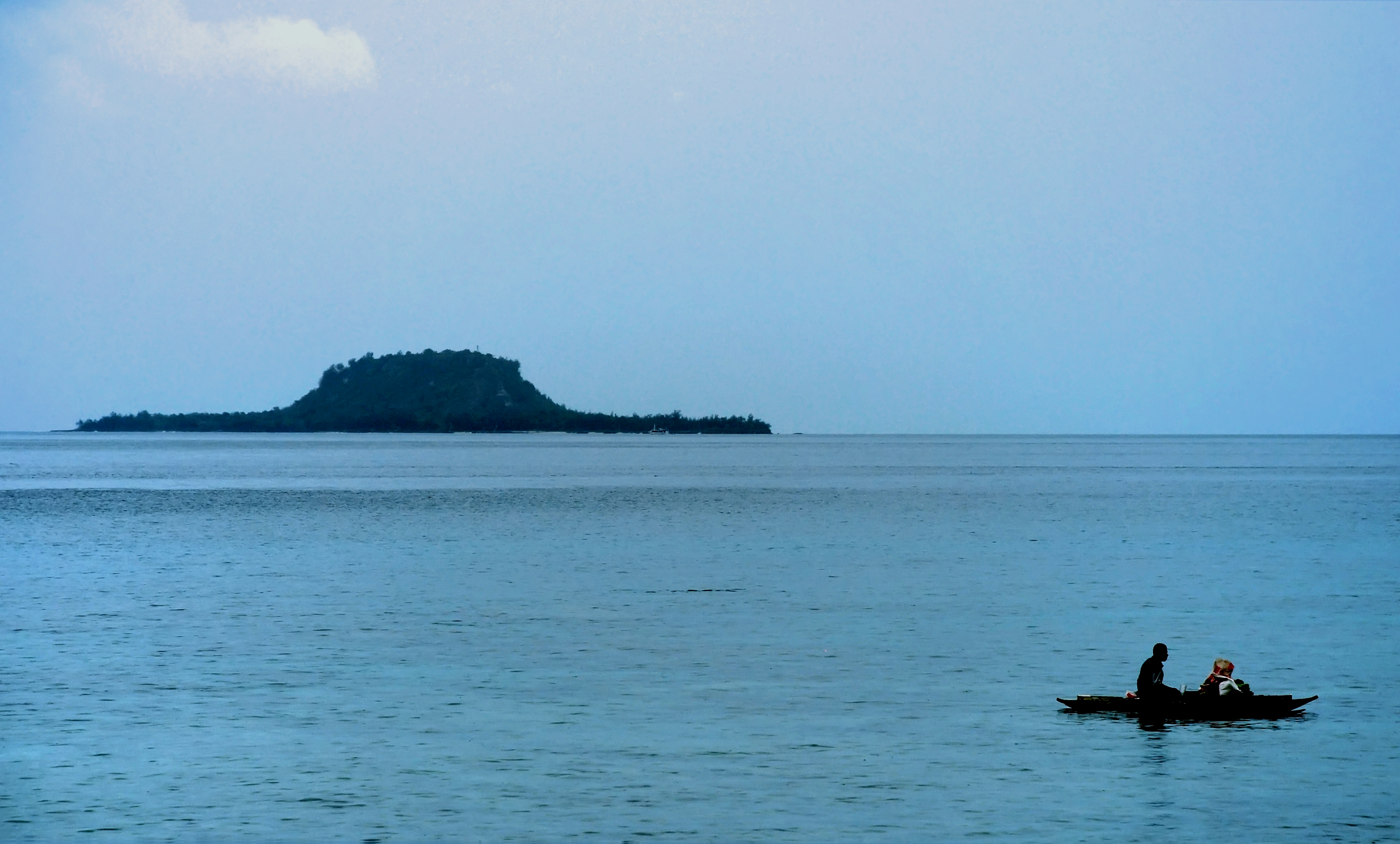
- Eretoka Island in 2006.

Geography
- Location: Pacific Ocean
- Coordinates: 17°39′00″S 168°8′00″E
- Archipelago: Vanuatu
- Highest point: 90 m

Administration
- Vanuatu
- Province: Shefa Province

Eretoka (also Hat Island, Érétoka, Retoka, Artok) is a small uninhabited island in Shefa Province of Vanuatu in the Pacific Ocean. The island lies off the western coast of Efate Island. There is a lighthouse built in the 1960s.

== Geography ==
Eretoka spans 2.3 kilometers in northeast-southwestern direction and has a maximum width of 670 meters. The center of the island forms a cap of coral lime over stratified pumice and is 90 meters high. Around the island center extends a wide and flat area of sand and limestone, which was lifted over the water surface during the last elevation of the seabed. Most of this area is no higher than five meters above sea level.

== History ==
Roy Mata, a powerful 16th-17th century Melanesian chief, was buried in the island. His elaborate grave was proclaimed a taboo and is supposed to contain the bodies of over 25 members of his retinue. The grave was studied by French archaeologist Jose Garranger in 1967, who analyzed the local folklore. In 2008, three sites associated with Roy Mata on the islands of Efate, Lelepa and Eretoka, were made UNESCO World Heritage Sites.
