= List of lighthouses in Vanuatu =

This is a list of lighthouses in Vanuatu.

== Lighthouses ==
Name	Image	Year built	Location & coordinates	Class of Light	Focal height	NGA number	Admiralty number	Range nml
Aore Island Lighthouse	Image	n/a	Aore Island; 15°32′00.4″S 167°12′49.9″E	Fl (2) WRG 15s.	24 metres (79 ft)	3504	K4880.6	white: 8 red: 6 green: 6
Cape Foreland Lighthouse		n/a	Epi Islandbr> 16°41′23.2″S 168°07′18.7″E	Fl (4) W 20s.	207 metres (679 ft)	3540	K4862	10
Eretoka Island Lighthouse	Image	1960s	Eretoka Island; ~17°38′25.4″S 168°09′04.2″E	Fl (2) W 10s.	96 metres (315 ft)	3560	K4858	8
Lamap Point Lighthouse		n/a	Malakula; ~16°25′14.9″S 167°48′20.8″E	Fl W 10s.	35 metres (115 ft)	3524	K4868	7
Million Dollar Point Lighthouse	Image	n/a	Luganville; 15°31′30.0″S 167°14′41.6″E	Fl (4) W 60s.	12 metres (39 ft)	3500	K4880.4	8
Ountovin Point Lighthouse		n/a	Erromango; 18°52′04.9″S 168°59′37.8″E	Fl (2) W 10s.	167 metres (548 ft)	3576	K4847	10
Palikoulo Point Lighthouse		n/a	Espiritu Santo; 15°28′26.9″S 167°15′18.7″E	Fl (3) W 15s.	23 metres (75 ft)	3496	K4880	14
Pango Point Lighthouse		2014	Efate; 17°46′52.8″S 168°15′34.5″E	Fl W 6s.	22 metres (72 ft)	3572	K4852	11
Port Vila Lighthouse	Image	n/a	Port Vila; 17°44′13.9″S 168°18′56.2″E	Dir WRG	43 metres (141 ft)	3552	K4854	10
Tutuba Lighthouse		n/a	Tutuba Island; 15°33′54.0″S 167°17′48.0″E (NGA)	L Fl W 5s.	24 metres (79 ft)	3512	K4877	7

== See also ==
- Lists of lighthouses and lightvessels
