= Moso (island) =

- Island
- Location in Vanuatu
- Coordinates: 17°32′S 168°15′E
- Country: Vanuatu
- Province: Shefa Province

Area
  - Total: 25.39 km^{2} (9.80 sq mi)
- Highest elevation: 129 m (423 ft)

Population (2009)
  - Total: 237
  - Density: 9.33/km^{2} (24.2/sq mi)
- Time zone: UTC+11 (VUT)

Moso is an island off the northwest coast of Efate in Vanuatu, in Shefa Province. It is separated from Efate by Namoso Passage, which is 200 metres (660 ft) wide at its narrowest point.

Along with Lelepa, it creates the harbour at north Efate known as Port Havannah. This harbour was a focal point during World War II, with many troops stationed there, including posts on Moso itself. Today, small tokens of the soldiers' presence can still be seen on Moso.

== History ==
Seven villages were originally scattered throughout Moso until missionaries facilitated their formation into one coastal village, Sunae. This community was divided in two in the early 1990s and some people split from Sunae, forming Tassirki village on central Moso.

== Transport ==
There are no roads or cars on Moso.

Access to the island is via banana boat from Tanoliu village in North East Efate.

== Tourism ==
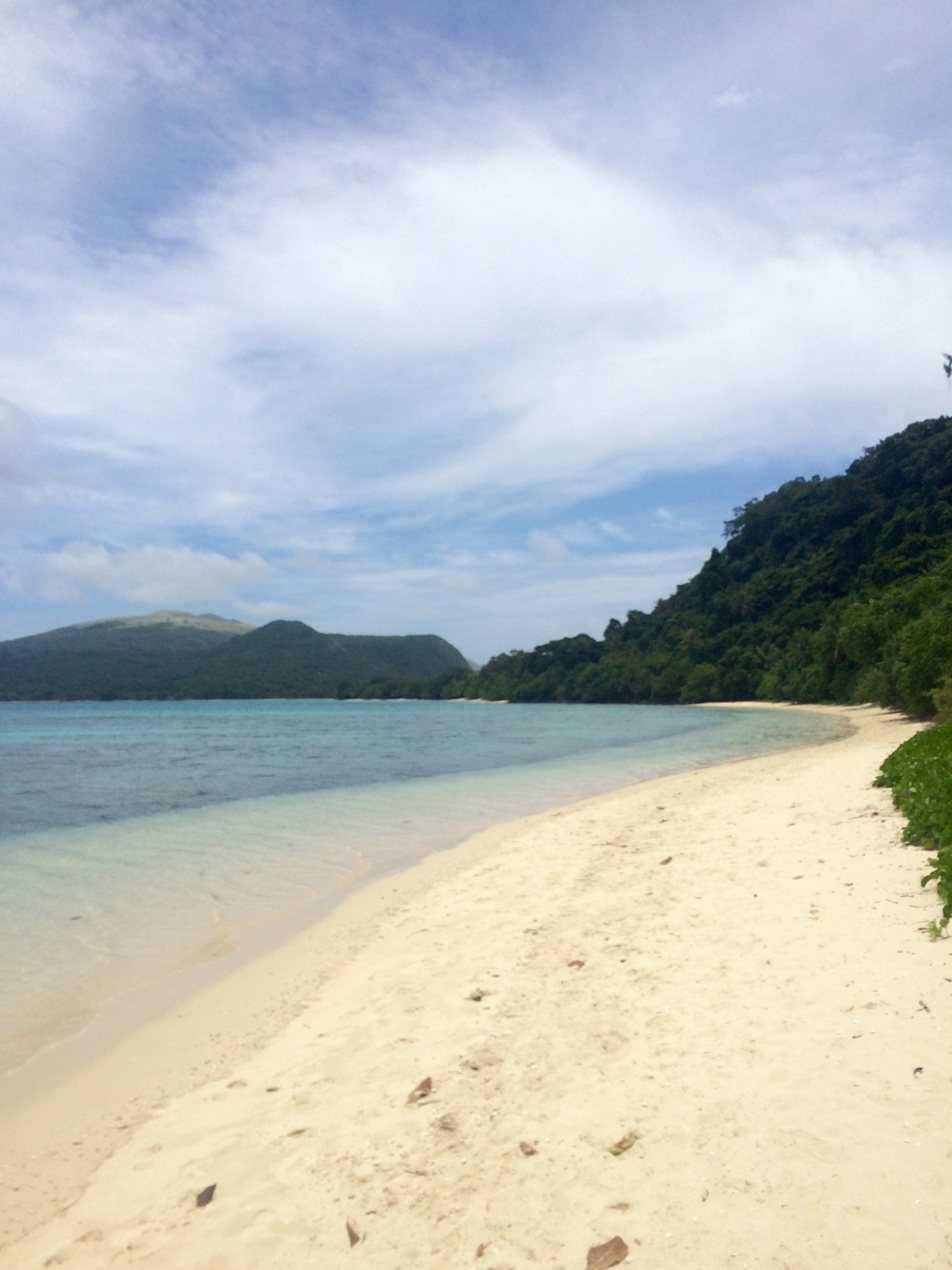
Moso Beach by Tasiriki village.

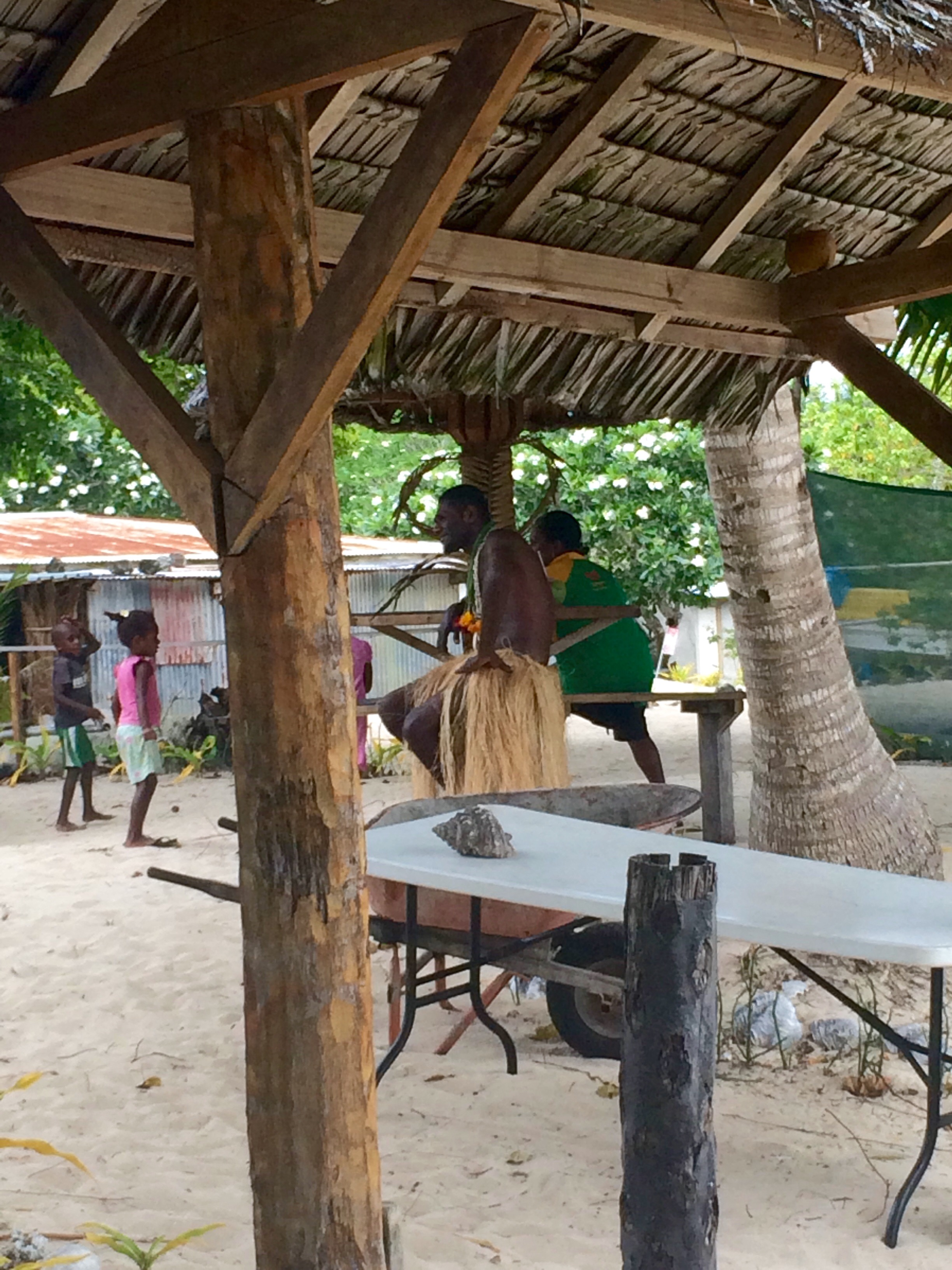
Tasiriki village tribal chief, 2014.

The Tasiriki community, in conjunction with Wan Smolbag Theatre, is the base for a turtle monitoring programme on northwestern Efate. The project is run throughout Vanuatu with the goal of preserving the endangered turtle species found in the Pacific. The community operates a bungalow that accommodates volunteers who stay for short-term periods assisting the locals with the turtle monitoring programme.

Sunae community is attempting to initiate a small tour business to the eastern part of the island as part of a community development project. This part of the island is where parts of Les Aventuriers de Koh-Lanta, the French version of the Survivor TV series, were filmed.

A few luxury homes have been developed and are rented to holiday makers. These homes are off the grid and operate via solar power and rain and well water.

== Demographics ==
There are approximately 240 ni-Vanuatu inhabitants on Moso, the majority in Tassirki village.

== Economy ==
Fishing, subsistence agriculture and tourism make up the economy of Moso. People most frequently fish from the traditional outrigger canoes both during the day and night.
