= 1452/1453 mystery eruption =

Unidentified volcanic eruption

A mysterious volcanic eruption in 1452 or 1453 triggered the first large sulfate spike in the 1450s, succeeded by another spike in 1458 caused by another mysterious eruption. The eruption caused a severe volcanic winter, leading to one of the strongest cooling events in the Northern Hemisphere. This date also coincides with a substantial intensification of the Little Ice Age.

== Date of sulfate spike ==
Early evidence of a large eruption in 1450–1460 came from a massive sulfate spike recorded in ice cores in Antarctica with dating uncertainty up to a few years. Early studies in the 1990s and 2000s incorrectly placed the date of this original sulfate spike in 1452/53 on the basis of high dating uncertainty while the Kuwae caldera in Vanuatu was assigned to be the source of this incorrectly dated sulfate spike. Since 2012, high-resolution sulfate records based on accurately dated ice cores shifted the date of the previously discovered sulfate event, which was possibly caused by a Kuwae eruption, to 1458 and confirmed another sulfate event in 1452/53.

== Ice-core and tree-ring records ==
The 1452/53 sulfate spike is recorded in both Greenland and Antarctica, but the sulfate signal in Greenland is significantly larger than that of Antarctica, suggesting a source volcano in the low latitudes of the Northern Hemisphere. Sulfur isotope composition of the 1452/53 sulfate indicates that the eruption emitted volcanic gases directly into the stratosphere, with significant impact on atmospheric chemistry and potential consequence for global climate. The reconstructed volcanic stratospheric sulfur injection of the 1452/53 event estimates that about 11 megatons of sulfur was injected into the stratosphere, roughly one-third that of the 1815 eruption of Mount Tambora, based on the same set of sulfate records.

The 1450s eruptions have been linked with the second pulse of the Little Ice Age, which had started two centuries earlier with the Samalas eruption and three other unidentified eruptions. Following the eruption, tree-ring evidence revealed an exceptional cooling in 1453 summer, ranged from a reduction of 0.4 °C (0.72 °F) in the Swiss Alps to a reduction of 6.9 °C (12.4 °F) in the Polar Urals. A study by Dr Kevin Pang of the Jet Propulsion Laboratory drew on evidence found in tree rings, ice cores and in the historic records of civilizations in Europe and China. Oak panels of British portrait paintings had abnormally narrow rings in 1453–1455. In Sweden, grain tithes fell to zero as the crops failed. Bristlecone pines of the Western United States show frost damage in 1453. The growth of European and Chinese trees was stunted in 1453–1457.

== Source of eruption ==
The 1452/1453 eruption has been associated with a volcanic eruption in Kuwae in the South Pacific island of Vanuatu, but in 2012 the Kuwae eruption was re-dated to 1458. Kuwae is also thought unlikely because sulfate deposits associated with the earlier eruption are much higher in Greenland ice cores than those in Antarctica, which suggests that the source volcano is located in the Northern Hemisphere. Lack of tephra discoveries associated with the 1452/53 sulfate layer has prevented identification using geochemical matching.

== Historical records ==
Mexican codices describe autumn frosts in 1453 that affected agriculture throughout central Mexico.

According to the history of the Ming dynasty in China in the spring of 1453, "nonstop snow damaged wheat crops". Later that year, as the dust obscured the sunlight, "several feet of snow fell in six provinces; tens of thousands of people froze to death". Early in 1454, "it snowed for 40 days south of the Yangtze River and countless died of cold and famine". Lakes and rivers were frozen, and the Yellow Sea was icebound out to 20 km (12 mi) from shore.

The eruption occurred just before the fall of Constantinople, the last bastion of the once-mighty Byzantine Empire. The Ottoman Turks, led by Sultan Mehmed II, laid siege to the city on 5 April 1453 and conquered it on 29 May 1453. Pang found mention of the volcano's after-effects in chronicles of the empire's last days. Historians noted that the city's gardens, that spring, produced very little. On the night of 22 May 1453, the moon, the symbol of Constantinople, rose in dark eclipse, fulfilling a prophecy of the city's demise. On 25 May 1453, a thunderstorm burst on the city: "It was impossible to stand up against the hail, and the rain came down in such torrents that whole streets were flooded". The next day, on 26 May 1453, the whole city was blotted out by a thick fog, a condition that was completely unheard of in the area at that time of year.

Pang reported that when the fog lifted that evening, "flames engulfed the dome of the Hagia Sophia, and lights, too, could be seen from the walls, glimmering in the distant countryside far behind the Turkish camp (to the west)". Residents of the city thought the strange light was from reflection from a fire set by the Turkish attackers. However, that the "fire" was an optical illusion by the reflection of intensely red twilight glow by clouds of volcanic ash high in the atmosphere. Many such false fire alarms were reported worldwide after the 1883 eruption of Krakatoa in Indonesia.

While Pang may be inaccurate in saying "I conclude that Kuwae erupted in early 1453 ... The residual volcanic cloud could have made the apocalyptic June 1456 apparition of the Comet Halley look 'red' with a 'golden' tail, as reported by contemporary astronomers", the events described could be due to the aftermath of volcanic eruptions; it is just not clear which ones.

== See also ==
- Extreme weather events of 535–536
- Timeline of volcanism on Earth
- Year Without a Summer
- 1808 mystery eruption
