= Ewose =

Island in Vanuatu

- Location within Vanuatu

Geography
- Location: Pacific Ocean
- Coordinates: 16°57′30″S 168°34′35″E
- Archipelago: Vanuatu
- Highest elevation: 319 m (1047 ft)

Administration
- Vanuatu
- Province: Shefa Province

Demographics
- Population: 0 (2015)
- Ethnic groups: None

Ewose is a small uninhabited island in the Shefa Province of Vanuatu in the Pacific Ocean.

== Geography ==
The island of Ewose lies 2.2 kilometres (1.4 mi) off the south-west coast of Tongoa Island and is a part of Shepherd Islands archipelago. The island spans 2.5 kilometres (1.6 mi) by 0.5 kilometres (0.31 mi). The terrain elevation above the sea level is 319 meters (1,047 ft).
