= Kuwae =

Submarine caldera between Epi and Tongoa in Vanuatu

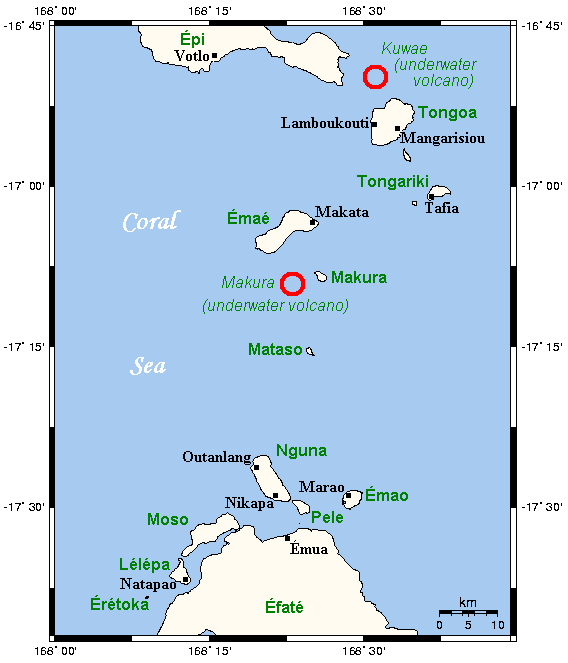
- Shepherd Islands and associated underwater volcanoes.

Highest point
- Elevation: –2 m (–6 ft) avg less than –400 m (–1,312 ft)
- Listing: List of volcanoes in Vanuatu
- Coordinates: 16°49′45″S 168°32′10″E

Geography
- Location: Shepherd Islands, Vanuatu

Geology
- Mountain type: Caldera
- Volcanic arc: New Hebrides arc
- Last eruption: February to September 1974

Kuwae was a landmass that existed in the vicinity of Tongoa and was destroyed by volcanic eruption in the fifteenth century, probably through caldera subsidence. Its exact location is debated. A submarine caldera now known as the Kuwae caldera is a candidate, located between the Epi and Tongoa islands and cutting through the flank of the Tavani Ruru volcano on Epi and the northwestern end of Tongoa. Another candidate is a proposed caldera between Tongoa and Tongariki.

The submarine volcano Karua, one of the most active volcanoes of Vanuatu, is near the northern rim of the Kuwae caldera.

== Caldera location and Kuwae landmass ==
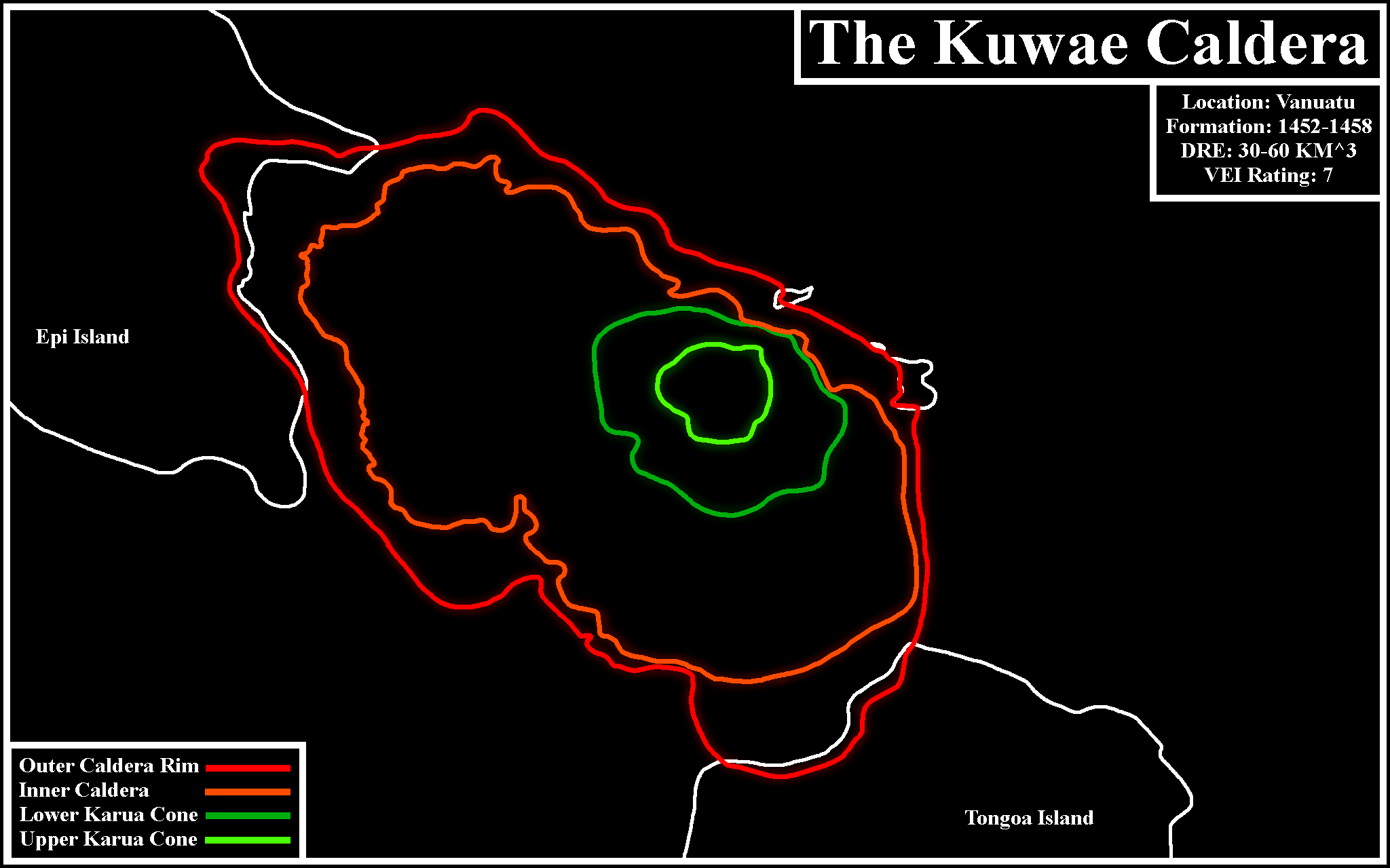
An Illustration showing the outlines of the Kuwae Caldera.

In Tongoan folklore, Kuwae is a lost land in the vicinity of Tongoa and was destroyed by a massive volcanic eruption, probably associated with caldera subsidence. In the legend of Ti Tongoa Liseiriki, the young man in Tongoa escaped the eruption along the coast of Kuwae to Tongariki which became a remnant of submerged Kuwae. This implies that Tongoa and Tongariki were connected by Kuwae landmass before the eruption. A submerged caldera is proposed in southeast of Tongoa and part of its western rim is above sea-level to form islands of Ewose, Buninga, and Tongariki. These islands are also described to be fragments of old Kuwae landmass in the folklore, consistent with presence of caldera in this location. But a bathymetric survey of this area could not confirm the presence of a caldera.

In 1994, bathymetry north of Tongoa revealed a large, 6×12-kilometer caldera between Tongoa and Epi, and it was named Kuwae caldera. However, whether or not the Kuwae caldera was responsible for the disappearance of Kuwae landmass and fifteenth century eruption in the folklore is debated, because oral traditions clearly describe it being south of Tongoa.

From which of these two calderas did the fifteenth century eruption derive has not been definitely identified.

== Eruptive history ==
Little is known about the pre-fifteenth century eruptive history of Kuwae volcano. Thick basalt and andesite lava flows and scoria agglomerates were produced from early effusive and strombolian eruptions over a long period of time. The oldest outcrop on Tongoa island is basalt dated to 73,000 years ago.

=== Fifteenth-century eruption ===
The major ignimbrite eruption was preceded by a period of low-intensity phreatomagmatic eruptions lasting months to years. These pre-climactic eruptions are similar to or less explosive than Surtseyan-style. Then the hydromagmatic phase was followed by major pyroclastic flows with gradually increasing eruptive temperature. Much of Tongoa and Epi islands are thickly blanketed with these pyroclastic flow deposits. The extent of pumice fall from this stage reached Tongariki island, and possibly southern end of Efaté Island. Pyroclastic flow with thickness >1 m is reported some 50 km from the eruptive centre. However, no plinian deposit is observed during any phase of the eruption.

Direct estimation of erupted magma volume based on field mapping of the deposits is impossible because the majority of the Kuwae ignimbrite was deposited in the sea. Further oceanographic surveys are needed to study the distribution of submarine ignimbrites and tephra fall deposits. If assuming the entire Kuwae caldera was formed during this eruption, then caldera dimension (total caldera subsidence may have been as great as 0.8–1.1 km) shows that about 30–60 km^{3} (DRE) was erupted, making this eruption of one of the largest in the last 10,000 years.

This assumption has been challenged by another team on the basis of that preserved ignimbrite indicates only small- to moderate-size eruption, implying that Kuwae caldera did not form through this eruption. The team also hinted that the eruptive source of ignimbrite may not at all be Kuwae-caldera-based on the direction of pyroclastic flows on Tongoa, which came from southeast. Ongoing investigation by a team of volcanologists and anthropologists will try to resolve the debate around the nature of Kuwae eruption.

The age of eruption and its association to the cataclysm in Tongoa folklore are established by radiocarbon dating of samples found in pyroclastic flows and the burial of Ti Tongoa Liseiriki. In the Tongoa folklore, Ti Tongoa Liseiriki survived the volcanic eruption and was the first to resettle. An analysis of the bone collagens of Ti Tongoa Liseiriki yields a date of 1475±85 CE. Ages of carbonized trunks killed by pyroclastic flows cluster around 1410–1450 CE.

Early studies linked this eruption to a major sulfate spike in Antarctic ice cores. The sulfate spike was initially dated to 1452 CE with uncertainty up to a few years, but a study in 2012 re-dated this major Southern-Hemispheric-origin sulfate spike to 1458 CE with zero-year uncertainty. The tephra found with the spike in ice cores discards Kuwae as the source of tephra on a geochemical basis. The source of this spike has not been definitively identified, while the Kuwae eruption remains a potential candidate.

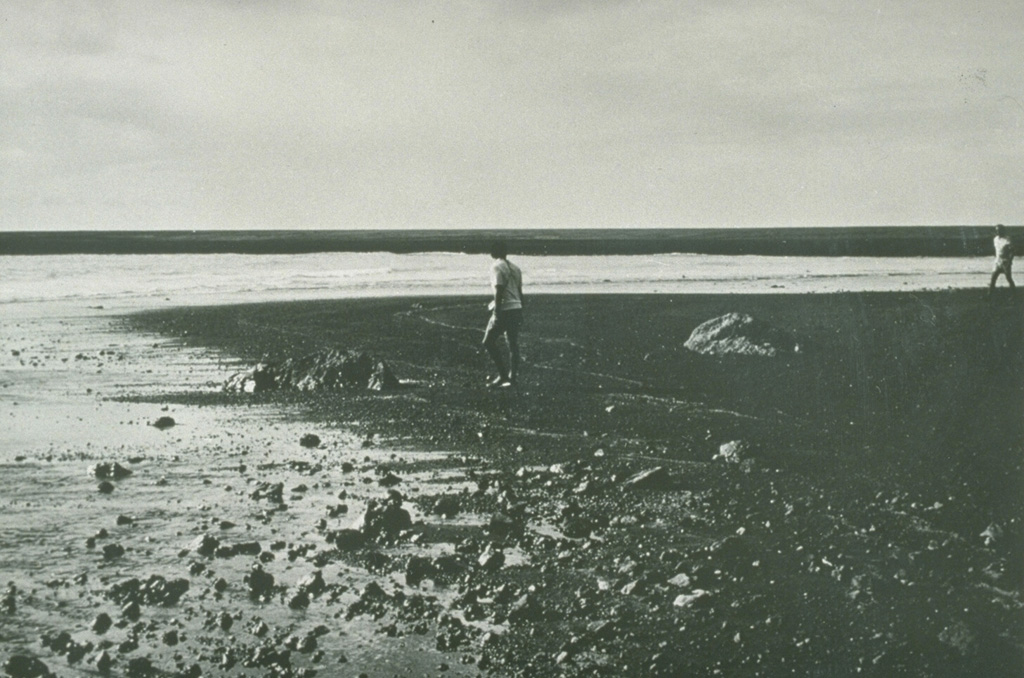
An ephemeral island formed by the Kuwae Caldera after an eruption on February 22, 1971.

=== Recent activity ===
Since its most recent historic large eruption, Kuwae caldera has had several smaller eruptions ranging from 0 to 3 on the Volcanic Explosivity Index (VEI). The latest confirmed eruption occurred on 4 February 1974 ± 4 days. It had a VEI of 0, and was a submarine eruption that formed a new island.

Islands have regularly formed in Kuwae caldera. The 1897–1901 eruption built an island 1 km long and 15 m high. It disappeared within 6 months. The 1948–1949 eruption formed an island and built a cone 1.6 km in diameter and 100 m high. That island also lasted less than one year. All the islands have disappeared due to wave action and caldera floor movements. In 1959 and 1971, the island reappeared for a short time. The last structure remained an island until 1975.

Present activity at Kuwae is confined to intermittent fumarole activity, which stains the water yellow. Over the top of the volcano, hydrogen sulfide bubbles reach the surface.

== See also ==
- 1452/1453 mystery eruption
- Timeline of volcanism on Earth
