= Buninga =

Island in Vanuatu

- Interactive map of Buninga

Geography
- Location: Pacific Ocean
- Coordinates: 17°2′S 168°35′E
- Archipelago: Vanuatu
- Highest elevation: 209 m (686 ft)

Administration
- Vanuatu
- Province: Shefa Province

Demographics
- Population: 112 (2015)

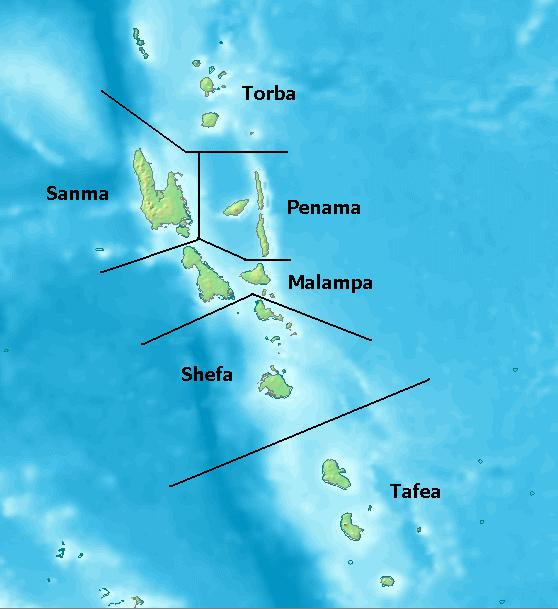
Provinces of Vanuatu with Shefa in the middle

Buninga Island is an inhabited island in Shefa Province of Vanuatu in the Pacific Ocean. The island is a part of Shepherd Islands archipelago.

== Geography ==
Buninga Island lies 2 km south-west of Tongariki Island. The island is 1.5 km in diameter. The estimated terrain elevation above the sea level is some 209 metres.

== Population ==
As of 2015, the official local population was 112 people in 23 households.
