= Lelepa (island) =

Island in Vanuatu

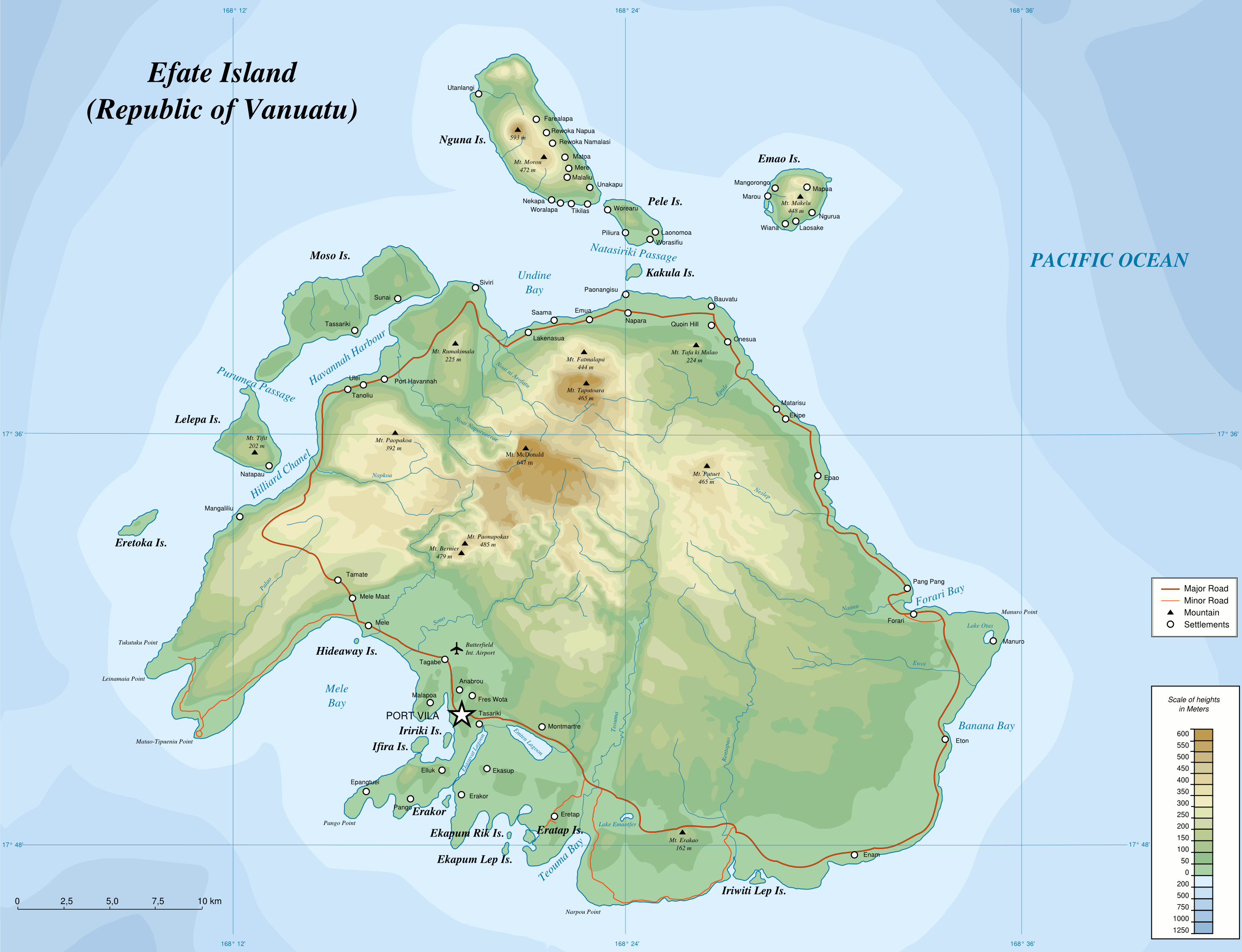
- Location of Lelepa on the Northern coast of Efate

- Location within Vanuatu

Geography
- Location: Pacific Ocean
- Coordinates: 17°35′54″S 168°12′44″E
- Archipelago: New Hebrides
- Area: 1.6 km^{2} (0.62 sq mi)
- Length: 5 km (3.1 mi)
- Highest elevation: 202 m (663 ft)
- Highest point: Mt. Tifit

Administration
- Vanuatu
- Largest settlement: Natapao (pop. 350)

Demographics
- Population: 500

Lelepa (or Lélépa) is an island in the southwestern Pacific island nation of Vanuatu. It is located off the northwest coast of the island of Efate.

== Geography ==
Lelepa has a length of about five kilometres in north-south direction and an area of 160 hectares. The highest point is Mt. Tifit (202 m). The population of Lelepa is about 500 people. The largest town on the island Natapao (pop. 350), is located on the southern edge of the island. At the northern end of the island lies the village Lelo. On the island there is a school, a kindergarten and two churches (Presbyterian Church and Seventh-day Adventists).

Together with the neighbouring islands Moso and Efate, Lelepa forms the natural harbor Havannah Harbour, named after the British ship HMS Havannah that twice anchored there in 1849-50.

The local language is Lelepa language, spoken by about 400 people. It is sometimes considered a dialect of South Efate language.

== Fele's Cave ==
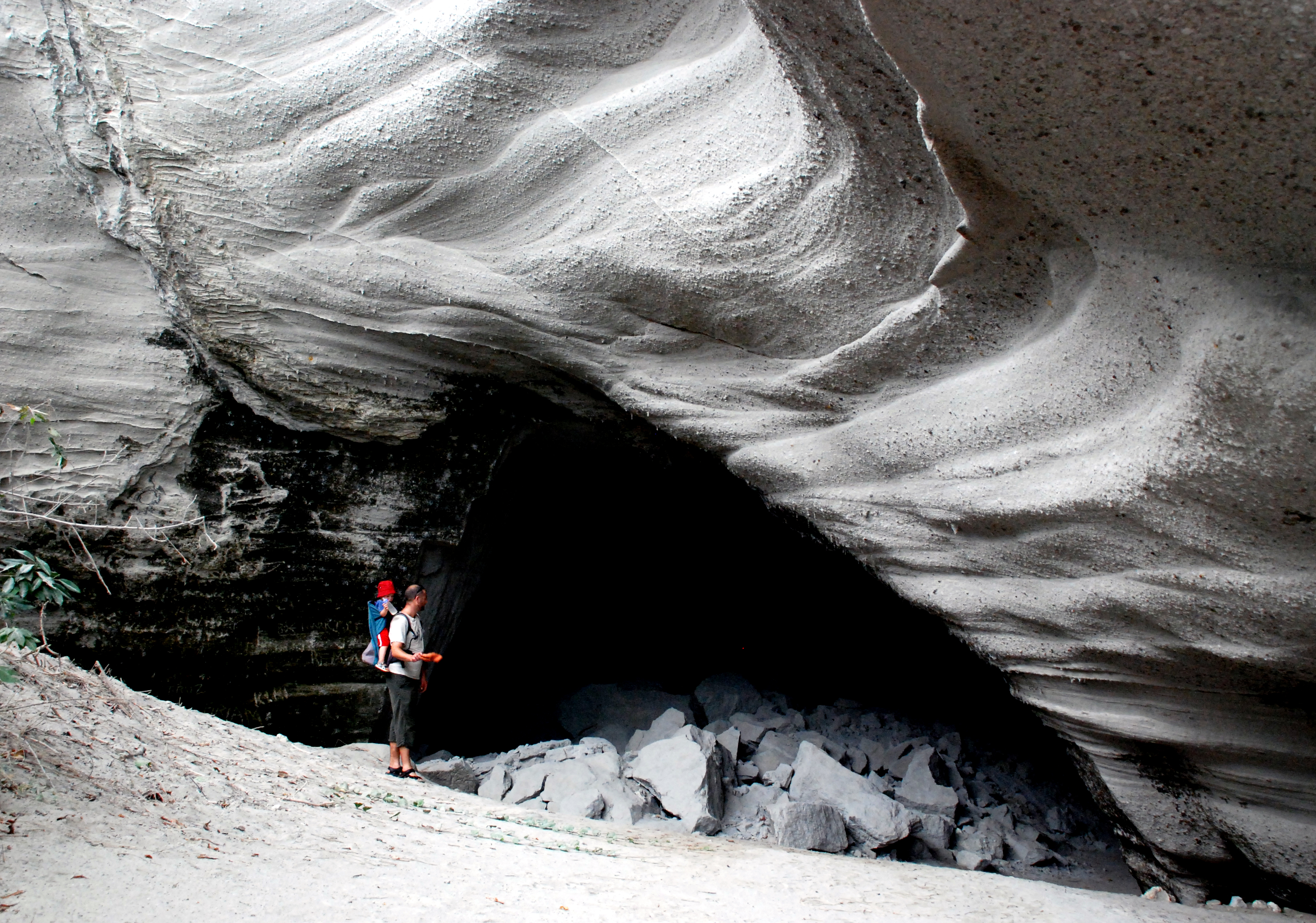
Entrance to Fels Cave

On the southwestern side of the island is Fels Cave. The name Falesa denotes a cave in the Nakanamanga language, Fels or Feles are local dialect variants. Within the cave, there are many rock drawings, up to 3000 years old rock. Since 2008, the cave has been part of Chief Roi Mata's Domain, which was designated a UNESCO World Heritage Site.

According to legend, the principal chief Roi Mata died in this cave, towards the end of the sixteenth century. From the entrance, there is a direct view of Eretoka, where he was buried. In other legends the cave was the residence of the first carrier of the title Chief Roi Mata.

Fels Cave, at an elevation of 22 metres, opens from a six metre high entrance to a height of 35 metres. Its diameter is about 50 metres, with an approximately circular floor plan. The surrounding rock, locally called fta, consists of volcanic breccia and pumice. It is protected from erosion by the overlying limestone, an uplifted coral reef.

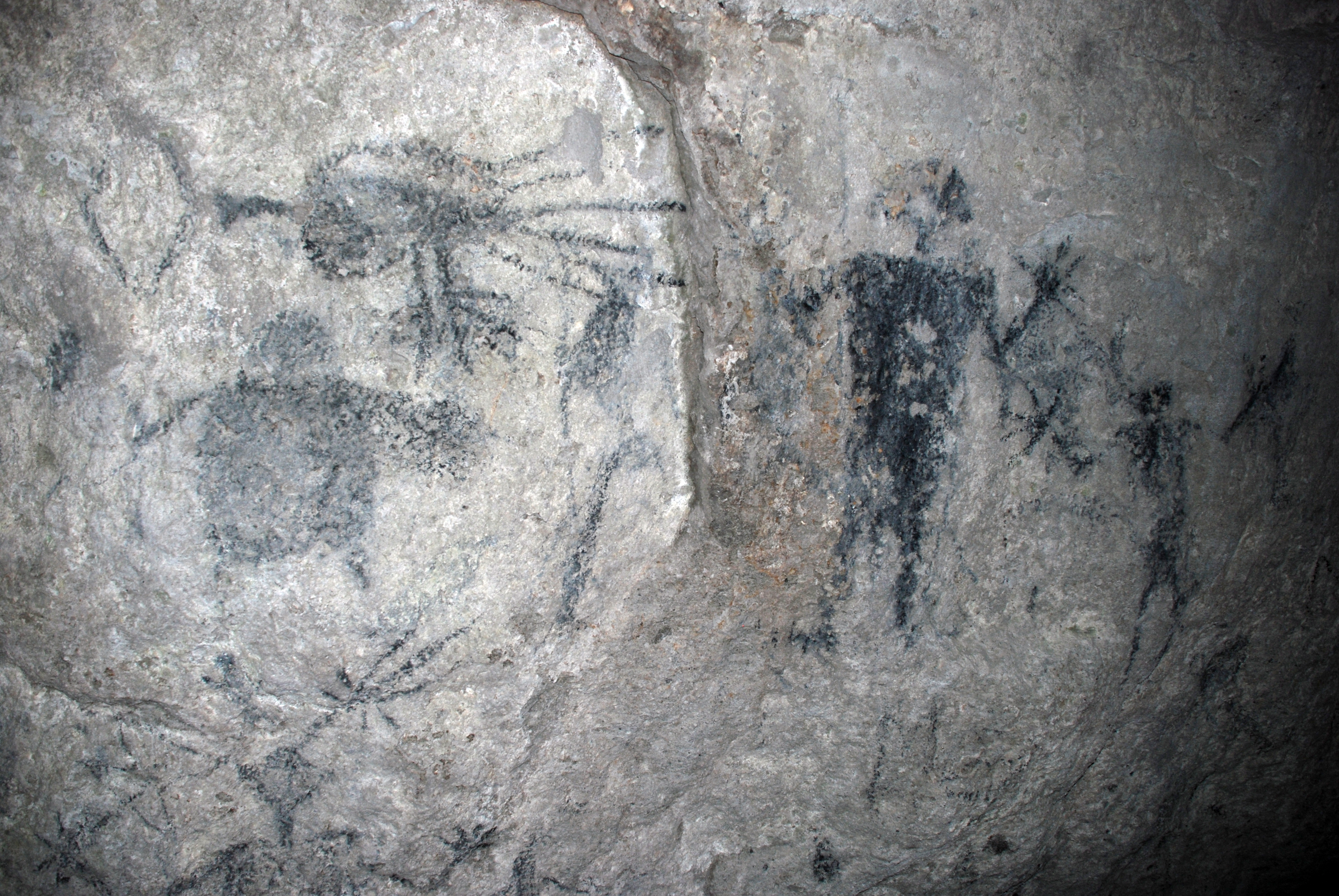
Cave Painting Cave in Rock. The right figure is often identified with Chief Roi Mata

Except for the darkened rear wall, all the walls of the cave are covered to head height with cave paintings, some of which overlap each other. The oldest ones are red spots and handprints, probably dating from the first millennium BCE, assigned to the Lapita culture. However, most of the pictures are black line drawings. Among them are some that are 1,500 years old, but most were made much later; the most recently dated ones are from the eighteenth century. The illustrations show birds, fish, and anthropomorphic figures. Abstract designs include simple and complex geometric figures such as angles, triangles and diamond shapes. The largest human representation, according to tradition, is that of Roi Mata.

Excavations show no evidence that the cave was ever inhabited. In earthquakes, it is regularly threatened by rockslides. In the last major earthquake in 2002, part of the entrance collapsed.

For residents of Lelepa the cave is considered tapu. According to local beliefs, after death one's soul moves into the Fels Cave. It is said that one can then find their footprints at the entrance. There is a tradition to sweep that area after a death and to look for the footprints the next morning, which is still occasionally observed.

== Tourism ==
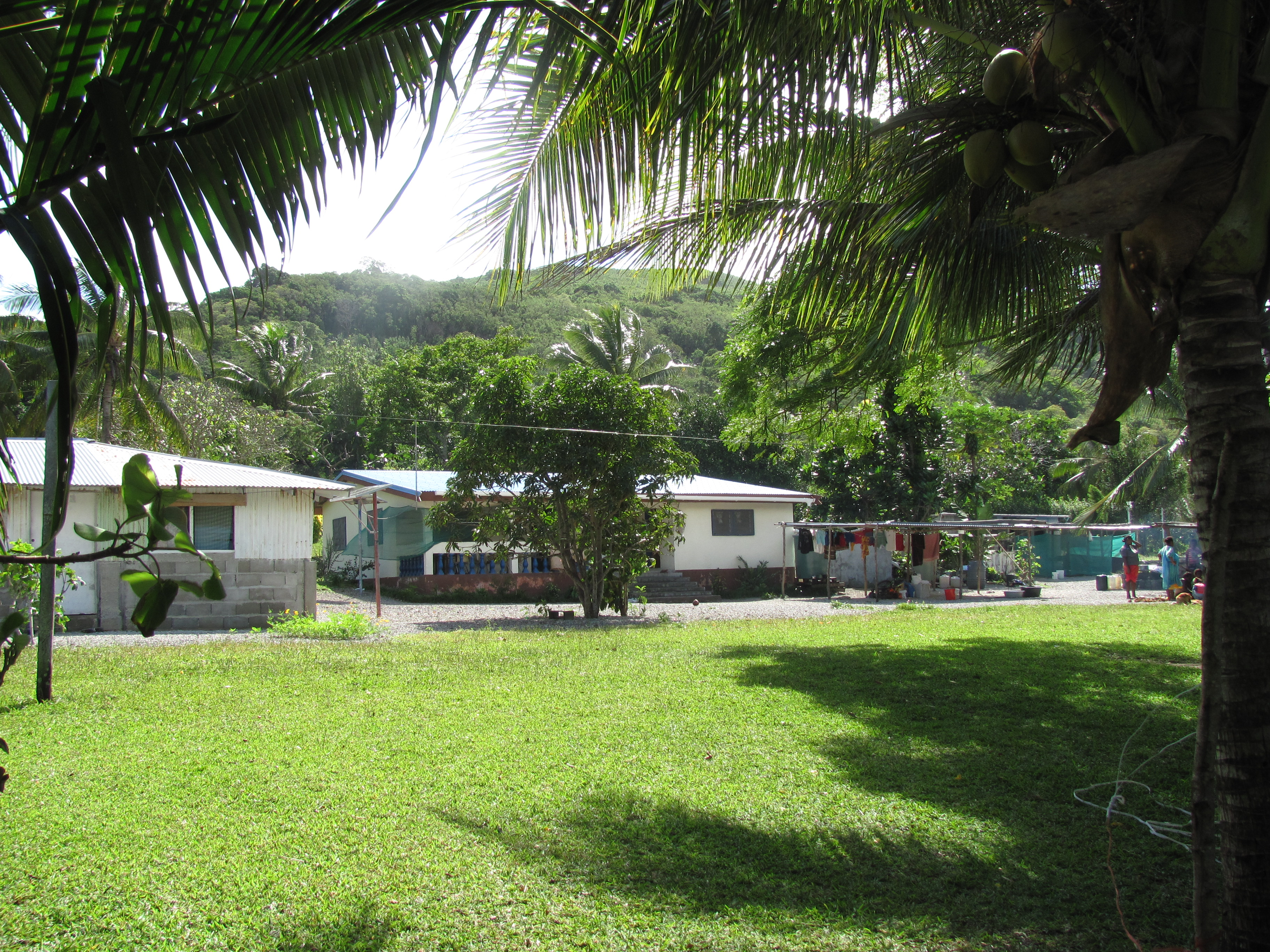
Town center of Natapao

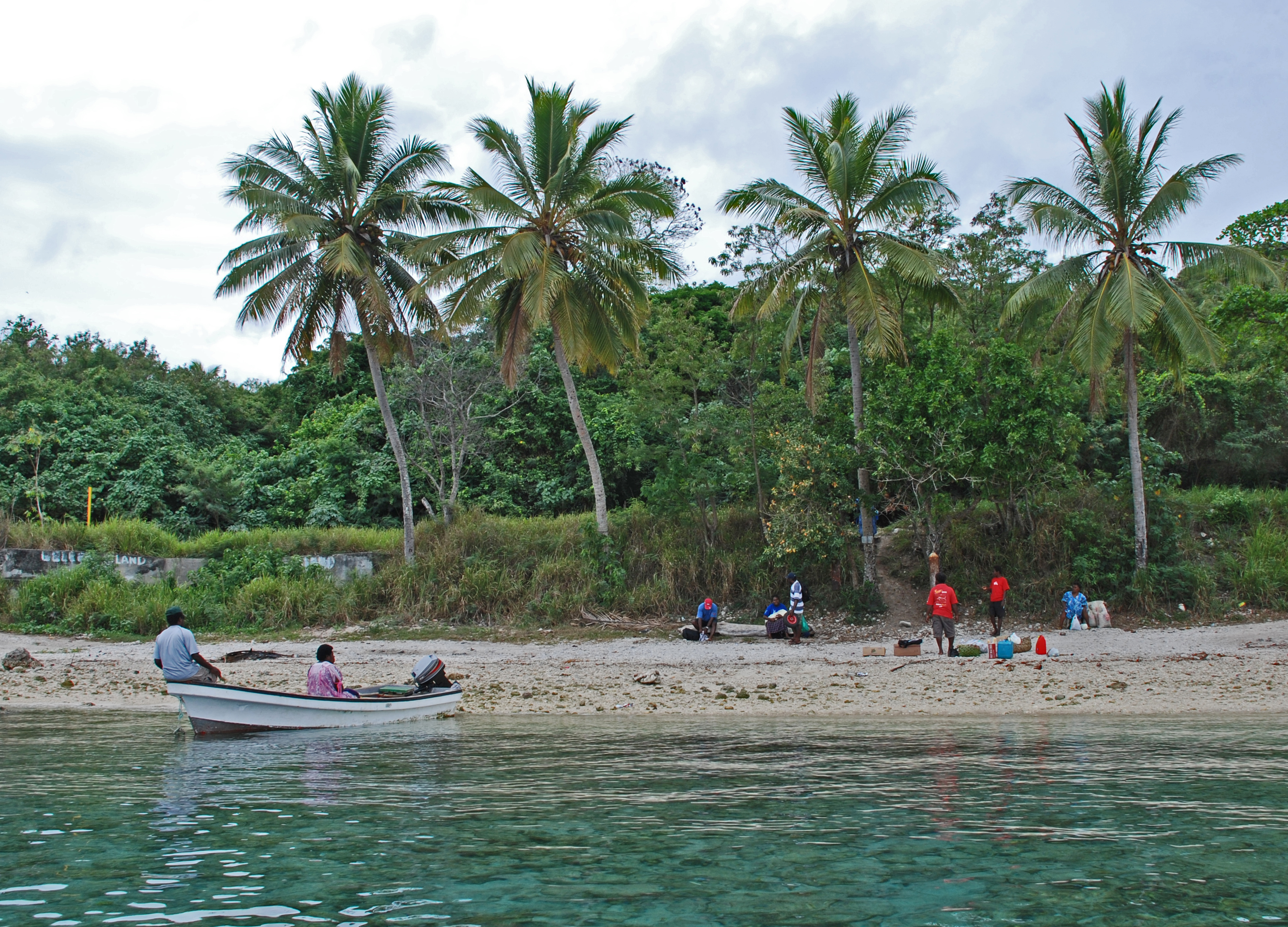
Beach of Lelepa

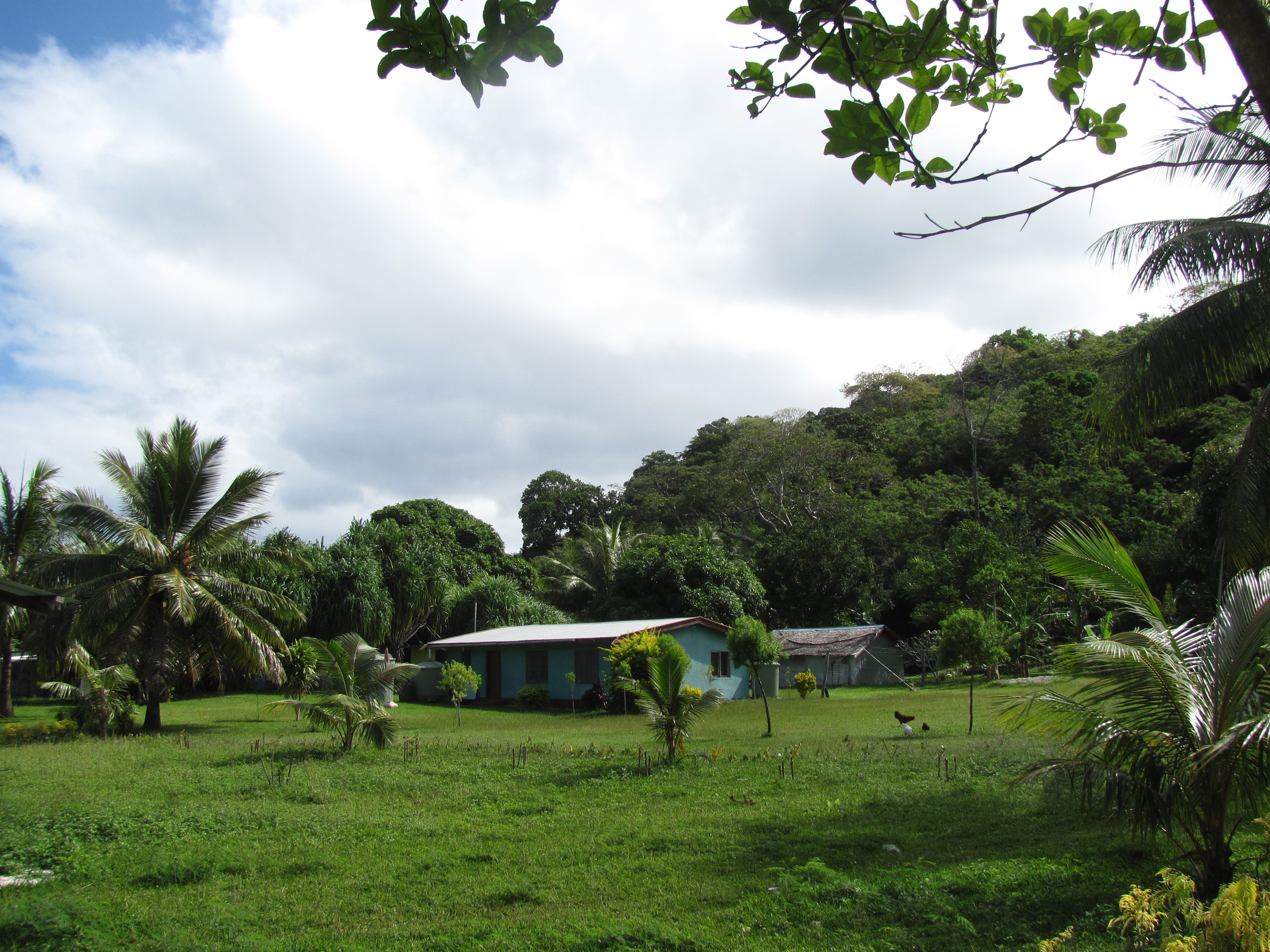
Typical residential house on the outskirts of Natapao

Fels Cave has attracted European visitors since the nineteenth century. At the entrance of the cave, there is graffiti from travelers going back to 1874.

The municipality Natapau operates a travel company that brings visitors daily by canoe to the island. The island gained fame from the opening sequence of the US television show Survivor: Vanuatu, in which the contestants are on the beach of Lelepa. However, the actual jungle camp was on Efate in Mangaliliu.

In October 2019, the Prime Minister of Vanuatu and Royal Caribbean International announced plans for the cruise line to develop a private resort on the island.
