= Tongariki =

Island in Vanuatu

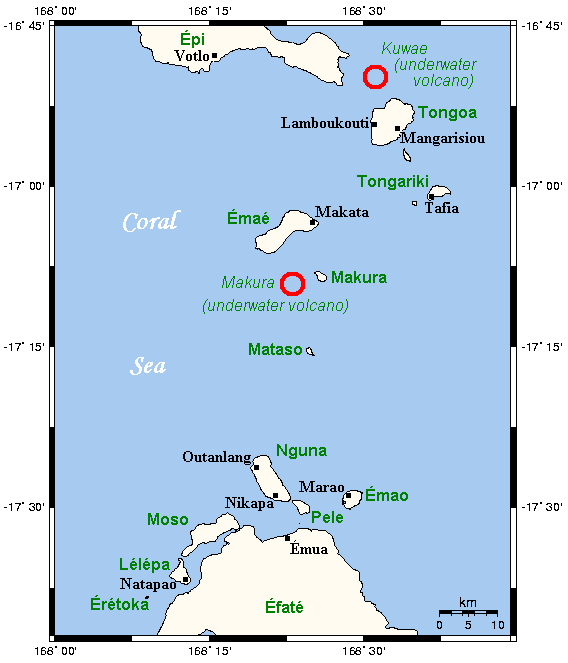

Geography
- Location: Pacific Ocean
- Coordinates: 17°1′S 168°37′E
- Archipelago: Vanuatu, Shepherd Islands
- Highest elevation: 521 m (1709 ft)

Administration
- Vanuatu
- Province: Shefa Province

Demographics
- Population: 274 (2015)

Tongariki Island is an inhabited island in Shefa Province of Vanuatu in the Pacific Ocean. The island is a part of Shepherd Islands archipelago.

== Name ==
The name Tongariki is from Emae, reflecting the Proto-Polynesian words *toŋa "southward" and *riki "small".

== Geography ==
Tongariki is a small island of volcanic origin located in the eastern Shepherd Islands, having no beaches or reefs. Several small islands lie close to the south coast. The island is 3.8 km long and 1.7 km wide. The estimated highest terrain elevation above the sea level is some 521 metres. The uninhabited island of Falea lies 1.8 km north-west of Tongariki.The island consist of five villages known as Tavia, Lewaima, Lakilia, mu-ura and Erata.

== Population ==
As of 2015, the official local population was 274 people in 55 households. The main village is Erata. Some local people speak Namakura language.
