= Shefa Province =

Province of Vanuatu

Coordinates: 17°20′S 168°30′E

Shefa
- Province
- Flag

- Shefa in Vanuatu
- Country: Vanuatu
- Capital: Port Vila

Area
  - Total: 1,455 km^{2} (562 sq mi)

Population (2016)
  - Total: 97,602
  - Density: 67.08/km^{2} (173.7/sq mi)

Shefa is one of the six provinces of Vanuatu, located in the center of the country and including the islands of Epi and Efate and the Shepherd Islands.

The province's name is derived from the initial letters of SHepherd and EFAte.

It has a population of 78,723 people and an area of 1,455 km^{2} (562 sq mi). Its capital is Port Vila, which is also the capital of the nation.

== Administrative divisions ==
Shefa Province are subdivided into nineteen area councils, which are further subdivided into populated places (i.e.: villages, communities, etc.).

- East Efate Area Council
- Emae Area Council
- Emau Area Council
- Erakor Area Council
- Eratap Area Council
- Ifira Area Council
- Makira-Mataso Area Council
- Mele Area Council
- Nguna-Pele Area Council
- North Efate Area Council
- North West Efate Area Council
- Pango Area Council
- Tanvasoko Area Council
- Tongariki-Buninga Area Council
- Tongoa Area Council
- Varsu Area Council
- Vermali Area Council
- Vermaul Area Council
- Yarsu Area Council

== History ==
In the 1860s, Havanna Harbour, north Efate, was the centre of development in Shefa, with cotton plantations the focus. With dwindling prices for cotton, agricultural administrators turned to maize and coffee, before settling mainly with coconuts and cattle which are the main agricultural products today.

The French and British continued to have conflicting interests in Vanuatu (then known as New Hebrides) and decided upon a Joint Naval Commission, or Condominium, in 1887, with the Joint Court opened in 1910, it is still used today.

Shefa Province was a strategic location during World War II for the mainly American troops. Major instalments were placed on northern Efate along Havanna Harbour including Tanaliou, Siviri and Saama, and some outer Efate Islands including Moso Island.

In December 2021, the province was first to recognize Benny Wenda as the president of the transitional government of West Papua.

== Geography ==
The Shefa Islands are volcanic and limestone/raised reef in origin. The one active volcano in the Province, on Epi is only sporadically active, and other underwater and extinct volcanoes are scattered throughout Shefa.

Shefa is made up of approximately 27 islands, Efate being the most populated and also the location of the Vanuatu capital, Port Vila. It is at the south end of the province and is surrounded by several smaller islands, including Iririki, Ifira, Eratap, Erakor, Erueti Lep, Ekapum Lep, Eretoka (Hat), Lelepa, Moso, Nguna, Pele, Kakula, and Emao. To the north are the Shepherd Islands, a group that includes Naore, Etarik, Mataso, Makura, Emae, Buninga, Tongariki, Tongoa, Ewose, and Laika. At the north end is the other large island in the province, Epi, as well as nearby Tefala, Namuka and Lamen. Some of these islands are uninhabited.

There are a large number of reefs accessible for divers, including the Pango Wall and Mele reefs. It is also possible sight aquatic species such as turtle and dugongs near Erakor Island and at marine sanctuaries.

Some of the Shefa islands have no permanent watercourses and water must be collected for drinking and bathing from rain water, which can be a tenacious exercise during drier years. The rivers of Shefa include the Tagabe, the Epule, and the Rentapau River.

Marine sanctuaries are becoming an increasingly popular way to attempt to preserve marine life around Shefa, although traditional methods of conservation can be highly effective. This movement is also an attempt to increase tourism. Parks and Sanctuaries include the Efate Land Management Area. the Nikaura Marine Protected Area on Epi, the Nguna-Pele Marine Protected Area Network on Nguna and Pele, and the Hideaway Marine Sanctuary, Hideaway Island.

== Islands ==
Name	Population	Area in km^{2}
Buninga	144	
Efate	65,829	899.5
Emae	743	32
Emao	602	
Epi	5,207	444
Ifira	811	
Lamen	440	
Lelepa	387	
Makura	106	
Mataso	74	
Moso	237	
Nguna	1,255	
Pele	321	
Tongariki	267	
Tongoa	2,300	

== Demographics ==
The capital of Vanuatu, Port Vila is home to approximately 44,000 people, mostly the indigenous ni-Vanuatu, and Shefa home to an estimated 79,000 in the 2009 census. Both anecdotal and statistical information shows an increase in urbanisation which doubled between 1967 and 1999. Most of Shefa's population resides in coastal areas and Efate's interior is largely unoccupied.

== Politics ==
The Shefa Provincial Council Headquarters are located in Port Vila; these humble offices house the political and administrative hub of the Shefa government. The representatives for Shefa Province number some 18 and are elected every two years, with the president, vice president, 2nd vice president, 3rd vice president and treasurer being nominated at that time. The current president is John Markal, representing Erakor constituent.

== Culture ==
There are approximately five languages, apart from the national language of Bislama, spoken over Shefa including the Ifira-Mele, South Efate, Nakanamanga of North Efate and outer Efate islands, Namakir of Tongoa and parts of Emae, and Emae language (a Polynesian outlier, in contrast to the other Melanesian languages). French and English are also spoken widely through the province.

Shefa Province is home to the Chief Roi Mata Domain located in Northwest Efate covering the area from Mangililui and Mangaas to Lelepa Island to Eretoka (Hat) Island. Chief Roi Mata Domain was inscribed as a UNESCO World Heritage Site in 2008. It is the first such site to be inscribed in Vanuatu and is a popular attraction for tourists. The legend of Roi Mata speaks of a mighty Chief who brought peace to Efate and its surrounding islands after years of clan fighting and warfare. Jealous of his status, the Chief's brother shot him with a poison dart. Chief Roi Mata succumbed to the poison within Fels Cave on Lelepa island. He was then interred on Eretoka. Many still-living men and women were buried alongside him. This oral history was passed down over 400 years until a French archaeologist confirmed the tale by excavating the burial site and found some 40 skeletons adorned with jewellery denoting high rank.

There are no kastom villages left in Shefa Province, that is, with people walking around in grass skirts and blowing conch shells on a daily basis; however, many traditional cultural practises are still strong in Shefa. Despite the inward-bound Western influence, people predominantly consume traditional foods, such as coconuts, bananas, and island cabbage, rather than packaged foods.

== Economy ==
Along with tourism and hospitality, subsistence agriculture and fishing are major economic activities. Hospitality venues include the many and increasing kava bars, or "nakamals", that are dotted around Port Vila and greater Shefa Province. Substantial financial boosts into communities generally come from land sales which incites disputes and displacement from traditional lands reducing the possibility for subsistence agriculture by some of the communities closer to Vila.

=== Tourism ===
Shefa Province is the gateway for many tourists into other parts of Vanuatu. Underwater wonderlands, endangered aquatic species, lush bush, active volcanos, living culture make up the diverse landscapes and experiences that await the tourist to Shefa Province. Specific tourist attractions include the Mele-Maat Cascades, the world's first underwater post office off the shore of Hideaway Island, the Vanuatu Cultural Centre, and tours to Chief Roi Mata's Domain. Port Vila is noted for its many high-quality restaurants and international cuisine.

Interest in Shefa Province's tourism and hospitality industry has been rising. There are plenty of bungalows located throughout the Province.

The market for Shefa tourism is currently honeymooners, cruise shippers and couples with the main draw cards for tourists being proximity to tourism infrastructure in Port Vila, Vanuatu culture, World War II history, and marine activities. With the bungalow market opening up there is increasing potential for backpacker tourism within Shefa Province, Vanuatu and the entire South Pacific.

== Transportation ==
The roads are not regularly maintained or graded and the few sealed roads are located close to Port Vila. Funding from the Millennium Challenge Account Vanuatu has been used to seal the entire ring road and satellite roads of Efate.

There are five airports in Shefa Province. The largest is the Bauerfield International Airport of Port Vila, serviced by numerous international carriers including Air Vanuatu, Qantas, Virgin Australia, Air New Zealand, and Fiji Airways. On Epi there are two regional airports, Lamen Bay Airport and Valesdir Airport. In the Shepherd Islands there are two more, Tongoa Airport and Siwo Airport on Emae. The regional airports are all serviced by Air Vanuatu.

Major wharves are located in Port Vila, Efate and Lamen Bay, Epi Island, which are serviced by cargo and cruise ships.
