= Shepherd Islands =

Group of islands in Vanuatu

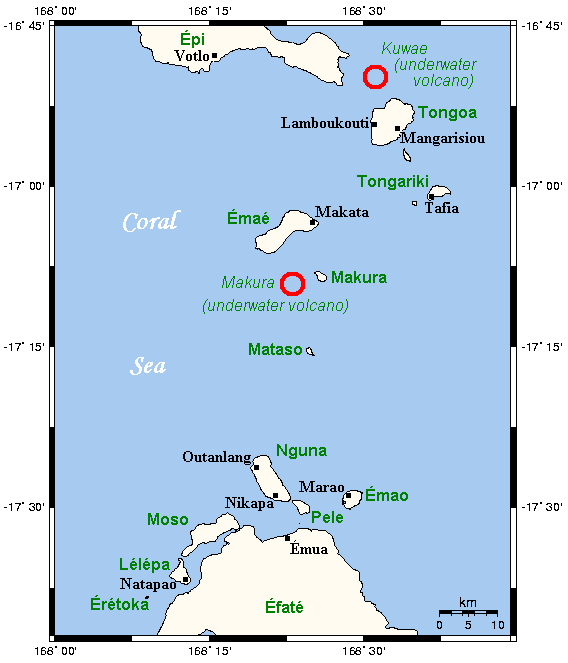
Shepherd Islands and associated underwater volcanoes

The Shepherd Islands (coordinates 16.8°S 168.5°E) are a group of islands lying between the larger islands of Epi and Éfaté, in the Shefa province of Vanuatu. The aggregate land area is 88 square kilometres (34 square miles). They were named by Captain Cook after Anthony Shepherd, a British astronomer and friend of Cook.

From north to south, the principal islands are: Laika, Tongoa (Kuwaé), Buninga (Mbining), Ewose, Falea, Tongariki (Atong), Émaé (Mai), Makura (Emwae), Mataso (Matah), and Monument (Étarik). Émaé and Tongoa are the largest islands in the group.

The region includes two submarine volcanoes, Kuwae and Makura. The islands are principally in the outlines of the calderas of these volcanoes. The highest of the islands is Émaé, at 644 metres (2,113 feet) above sea level, Tongariki is also above 500 metres (1,640 feet).

== Population and languages ==
At the 2009 census, the population numbered 3,634. The Shepherd Islands are quite densely populated. There is little economic activity although fishing is very good. Many people move to Port Vila to find work.

Most of the islands are inhabited by Melanesians like most of Vanuatu, but Émaé and Makura are Polynesian outliers. Other than Emae, on which is spoken a Futunic language, there are, according to Ethnologue, two languages spoken on the other islands: North Éfaté, spoken on Tongoa; and Namakura, spoken on Mataso, Makura, Tongoa, and Tongariki. These are all also spoken on the island of Éfaté, and are closely related to one another and the other languages of Éfaté and central Vanuatu in the language group Central Vanuatu languages.

== Natural disasters ==
Like the rest of Vanuatu, the Shepherd Islands are vulnerable to earthquakes, volcanoes, tsunamis, and cyclones. The island group was hit hard by Cyclone Pam in 2015 with Matoso island being the hardest hit.
