= Tongoa =

Inhabited island in Vanuatu

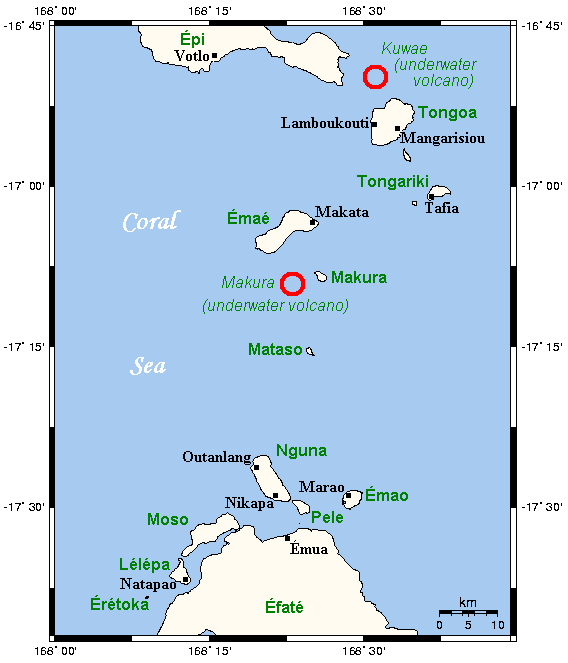
- The island of Tongoa, in the Shepherds group
- Interactive map of Tongoa

Geography
- Location: Pacific Ocean
- Coordinates: 16°54′S 168°33′E
- Archipelago: Vanuatu, Shepherd Islands
- Area: 42 km^{2} (16 sq mi)
- Highest elevation: 191 m (627 ft)

Administration
- Vanuatu
- Province: Shefa Province

Demographics
- Population: 2,243 (2015)

Tongoa is an inhabited island in Shefa Province of Vanuatu in the Pacific Ocean.

== Geography ==
Tongoa is the largest island of Shepherd Islands archipelago. The island is heavily vegetated and shows geothermal activity. Tongoa is of recent volcanic origin but currently has no currently active volcano. There are numerous volcanic cones on the island and some black sand beaches. The estimated terrain elevation above the sea level is some 191 metres. There is an airport on the island – Tongoa Airport (TGH).

== Flora and fauna ==
The interior part of the island is dense rain forest. The island is named after the Tongoa plant which grows in the area. Megapodes nest on the island. The only non-human mammals on the island are the Vanuatu flying fox and Tonga leather, or insular flying fox.

=== Important Bird Area ===
The island has been recognised as an Important Bird Area (IBA) by BirdLife International because it supports populations of Vanuatu megapodes, red-bellied fruit doves, grey-eared honeyeaters, cardinal myzomelas, Melanesian flycatchers, Vanuatu white-eyes and red-headed parrotfinches. The neighbouring islet of Laika to the north has a breeding colony of wedge-tailed shearwaters.

== Population ==
As of 2015, the official local population was 2243 people in 454 households, most of whom moved from Epi, Emae and Makira to Tongoa. There are 14 villages on the island. Some natives speak Makura language (Na Makura) and North Efate language (Na Kanamanga).
