= List of large Holocene volcanic eruptions =

List of volcanic eruptions that might have been recorded during the Holocene

Satellite images of the 15 January 2022 eruption of Hunga Tonga-Hunga Haʻapai

This is a list of volcanoes that have had large explosive eruptions during the Holocene (since about 11,650 years Before Present), with a volcanic explosivity index (VEI) of 5 or higher, or a plume height of at least 30 km. To date, there have been no eruptions with a confirmed VEI of 8 in the Holocene; and only a few VEI-7 eruptions are thought to have occurred during this time: the most recent was the 1815 eruption of Mount Tambora.

== Common Era (CE) ==
VEI	Volcano/complex	Volcanic arc/belt, subregion, or hotspot	Material volume (km^{3})		Date	Tephra or eruption name
VEI	Volcano/complex	Volcanic arc/belt, subregion, or hotspot	Bulk	DRE	Date	Tephra or eruption name
6	Hunga Tonga–Hunga Haʻapai	Tonga-Kermadec Islands volcanic arc	14	7.1	January 15, 2022	2022 Hunga Tonga–Hunga Haʻapai eruption and tsunami
5	Puyehue-Cordón Caulle	Andean Volcanic Belt	0.76–1.26	Unknown	June 4, 2011	2011–2012 Puyehue-Cordón Caulle eruption
5	Mount Hudson	Andean Volcanic Belt	4.3–7.6	1.6–2.7	August 8, 1991	
6	Mount Pinatubo	Luzon Volcanic Arc	10.4-11.0	5.3	June 15, 1991	1991 eruption of Mount Pinatubo
5	El Chichón	Chiapanecan Volcanic Arc	2.2	1.1	April 4, 1982	Tephra unit A
5	Mount St. Helens	Cascade Volcanic Arc	1.1	0.5	May 18, 1980	1980 eruption of Mount St. Helens
5	Mount Agung	Sunda Arc, Bali	1	Unknown	March 17, 1963	
5	Bezymianny (Note: Similar in scale to Mount St. Helens in 1980.)	Kamchatka	1.9	Unknown	March 30, 1956	
5	Kharimkotan	Kuril Islands	1	Unknown	1933	
5	Quizapú	Andean Volcanic Belt	9.5	7–10	April 10–21, 1932	
5	Submarine volcano NNE of Iriomote Island	Japan	1	Unknown	1924-10-31	
6	Novarupta	SW Alaska, Aleutian Arc	28–30	13–15	June 6, 1912	
5	Ksudach	Kamchatka	1.75	Unknown	1907-03-28	
6	Santa María	Central America Volcanic Arc, Guatemala	10.7–11.4	6.4	October 24, 1902	1902 eruption of Santa María
5	Mount Tarawera	Taupō Volcanic Zone	2	Unknown	June 10–15, 1886	1886 eruption of Mount Tarawera
6	Krakatoa	Sunda Arc	18–25	10-12.5	August 26, 1883	1883 eruption of Krakatoa
5	Askja	Iceland	1.83	Unknown	March 28, 1875	
5	Shiveluch	Kamchatka	2	Unknown	February 18, 1854	
5	Mount Agung	Sunda Arc, Bali	1	Unknown	1843	
5	Cosigüina	Central America Volcanic Arc, Nicaragua	4.25	Unknown	January 20, 1835	
5-6	Zavaritski Caldera	Kuril Islands	Unknown	Unknown	1831	
5	Mount Galunggung	Sunda Arc, Java	2	Unknown	October 8, 1822	
7	Mount Tambora	Sunda Arc, Sumbawa	150 - 175	37–50	April 10, 1815	1815 eruption of Mount Tambora
6?	Between Indonesia and Tonga (Note: At least three different volcanic eruptions contributed to the sulfate spike)	Unknown	Unknown	Unknown	c.1808	Undocumented 1808 eruption
5	Mount St. Helens	Cascade Volcanic Arc	1.5	Unknown	c.1800	T (Goat Rocks)
5	Katla	Iceland	1	Unknown	1755-10-17	
5	Taal volcano	Philippines	>1	Unknown	1754	1754 eruption of Taal Volcano
5	Mount Tarumae	Hokkaidō	4	Unknown	1739-08-18	Ta-a
5	Katla	Iceland	1	Unknown	1721-05-11	
5	Mount Fuji	Honshū	1.7	Unknown	December 16, 1707	Hōei eruption of Mount Fuji
5	Tangkoko	Sangihe Volcanic Arc	1	Unknown	1680	
5	Mount Gamkonora	Halmahera Volcanic Arc	1	Unknown	1673-05-20	
5	Mount Tarumae	Hokkaidō	2.8	Unknown	1667-09-24	Ta-b
5	Mount Usu	Hokkaidō	2.78	Unknown	1663-08-16	
6	Long Island, PNG	Bismarck Volcanic Arc	21	12	c.1660	Tibito tephra
5	Shiveluch	Kamchatka	≥ 2	Unknown	1652 CE ±11	SH1
5	Mount Melibengoy	Mindanao, Philippines	1	Unknown	December 26, 1640	
5	Komagatake	Hokkaidō	2.9	Unknown	1640-07-31	Ko-d
5	Mount Vesuvius	Campanian volcanic arc	1.1	Unknown	1631-12-16	
5	Furnas	São Miguel Island, Azores	2.1	Unknown	1630-09-03	
5	Katla	Iceland	1	Unknown	1625-09-02	
6	Huaynaputina	Andes, Central Volcanic Zone	11-14	4.6-4.95	February 19, 1600	
5	Raung	Sunda Arc, Java	1	Unknown	1593 CE	
5	Kelud	Sunda Arc, Java	1	Unknown	c.1586	
6	Billy Mitchell	Bougainville & Solomon Is.	13.5	Unknown	c.1580	BM2
5	Água de Pau	São Miguel Island, Azores	1.3	Unknown	1563-06-28 / 1563-07-26	
5	Mount St. Helens	Cascade Volcanic Arc	1.5	Unknown	c.1482	We (Kalama)
5	Mount St. Helens	Cascade Volcanic Arc	7.7	Unknown	c.1480	Wn (Kalama)
6	Bárðarbunga	Iceland	10	Unknown	c.1477	Veidivatnahraun
7?	Unknown	Unknown	Unknown	Unknown	c.1458	Undocumented 1458 eruption
7?	Unknown	Unknown	Unknown	Unknown	1452/1453	Undocumented 1452/1453 eruption
6	Öræfajökull	Iceland	10	Unknown	June 5, 1362	
6	Quilotoa	Andes, Northern Volcanic Zone	21	Unknown	c.1280	
5	Katla	Iceland	1		1262 CE	
7	Mount Samalas	Lombok Island	81–92	33–40	c.1257	1257 Samalas eruption (Note: May have triggered the Little Ice Age)
5	Mount Asama	Honshū	1.3	Unknown	August 29, 1108	Tennin eruption (1108)
5	Hekla	Iceland	1.2	Unknown	c.1104	H1 tephra
5	Shiveluch	Kamchatka	≥ 2		1034 CE ±11	SH2
5	Billy Mitchell	Bougainville & Solomon Is.	7		1030 CE	BM1
6	Baekdu Mountain	Balhae (China – North Korea border)	40–98	10–64	c.946	Millennium eruption Baegdusan-Tomakomai Tephra
5	Towada	Honshū	6.54	Unknown	c.915	Eruption episode A
6	Mount Churchill	eastern Alaska	50		847 CE ±1	WRAe
6	Rabaul	Bismarck Volcanic Arc	24	Unknown	c.683	Rabaul Pyroclastics
6	Dakataua	Bismarck Volcanic Arc	10		653 CE ±18	Dk
5	Shiveluch	Kamchatka	≥ 2		650 CE ±40	SH3
5	Shiveluch	Kamchatka	≥ 2		600 CE	
5	Mount Haruna	Honshū	1.6		550 CE ±10	Futatsudake-Ikaho eruption
6-7	Unknown source	Unknown (Note: Radical and far-ranging global effects. At least three separate eruptions contributed to the sulfate spike and climatic impact.)	Unknown	Unknown	c.536	Volcanic winter of 536
5	Mount Vesuvius	Campanian volcanic arc	1.2	Unknown	c.472	Pollena
6	Lake Ilopango	Central America Volcanic Arc, El Salvador	37–82	44–95	c.430	Tierra Blanca Joven eruption
5	Akutan	Aleutian Arc	1		340	Akutan tephra
7	Taupō Volcano	Taupō Volcanic Zone	110	Unknown	c.232 (Note: Sources give either ±5 or ±10)	Hatepe eruption
5	Masaya	Central America Volcanic Arc, Nicaragua	6.6		150	Masaya Tuff
5	Mount Vesuvius	Campanian volcanic arc	3.25	Unknown	c.79 (Note: First definite record of a volcanic eruption written by Pliny the Younger in 79 AD.)	Eruption of Mount Vesuvius in 79
6	Ambrym	Vanuatu	70	Unknown	c.50	Ambrym Pyroclastic Series

== Before Common Era (BCE) ==
VEI	Volcano/complex	Volcanic arc/belt, subregion, or hotspot	Material volume (km^{3})		Date	Age (ka)	Tephra or eruption name
VEI	Volcano/complex	Volcanic arc/belt, subregion, or hotspot	Bulk	DRE	Date	Age (ka)	Tephra or eruption name
6	Okmok Caldera	Umnak, Aleutian Arc	25+	15+	43 BCE	2	Okmok II
5	Etna	Campanian volcanic arc	1	Unknown	122 BCE	2.1	S flank, summit (Cratere del Piano caldera)
6	Raoul Island	Kermadec Islands	28.8	Unknown	250 BCE	2.2	Fleetwood
5	Mount St. Helens	Cascade Volcanic Arc	1.2	Unknown	530 BCE	2.5	Ps/Pu (Pine Creek)
5	Mount Tarumae	Hokkaidō	3.3		550 BCE		Ta-c
5	Shiveluch	Kamchatka	1		780 BCE		SH5
5	Mount Fuji	Honshū	1		930 BCE		Upper SE flank, Tephra layer Zu
5	Shiveluch	Kamchatka	> 1		950 BCE		
6	Mount Pinatubo	Luzon Volcanic Arc	12.5	Unknown	1050 BCE	3	Maraunot eruptive period
5	Cuicocha	Andean Volcanic Belt	~ 5		~1100 BCE		
5	Hekla	Iceland	7.5		1100 BCE ±50		H3 tephra
5	Mount Tarawera	Taupō Volcanic Zone	8		1310 BCE ±12		Kaharoa eruption
5	Mount Fuji	Honshū	1		1350 BCE		Tephra layer Os
5	Avachinsky	Kamchatka	1.75	Unknown	1350 BCE	3.3	Tephra layer IIAV3
6	Taupō Volcano	Taupō Volcanic Zone	17	Unknown	1460 BCE	3.4	Waimihia eruption
5	Avachinsky	Kamchatka	≥ 3.6	Unknown	1500 BCE	3.5	Tephra layer AV1
5	Hayes Volcano	SW Alaska, Aleutian Arc	8.1		1550 BCE		Hayes Tephra set H
7	Youngest Caldera, Santorini	South Aegean Volcanic Arc	34.5		1610 BCE	3.6	Minoan eruption
6	Mount St. Helens	Cascade Volcanic Arc	15.3	Unknown	1860 BCE	3.8	Yn (Smith Creek)
6	Mount Hudson	Andes, Southern Volcanic Zone	12	Unknown	1890 BCE	3.8	
5	Mount Dana	SW Alaska, Aleutian Arc	1		1890 BCE		1890 BCE eruption
5	Shiveluch	Kamchatka	> 1		2000 BCE		SHsp
6-7	Deception Island	South Shetland Islands	Unknown	30-60	1960 BCE	4	Outer Coast Tuff
6	Long Island, PNG	Bismarck Volcanic Arc	> 10	Unknown	2040 BCE	4	biliau beds
5	Rungwe	Great Rift Valley, Tanzania	2.2		2050 BCE		Rungwe pumice
5	Nishiyama, Hachijō-jima	Izu–Bonin–Mariana Arc	1.2		2050 BCE		Mitsune-7 scoria
5	Shiveluch	Kamchatka	> 1		2100 BCE		SHsp
7	Paektu Mountain	Balhae (China – North Korea border)	Unknown	Unknown	2264 BCE?	4.2–5.1	Tianwenfeng eruption
7	Cerro Blanco (Argentina)	Andes, Central Volcanic Zone	172	8–83	2300 BCE	4.3	
5	Hekla	Iceland	5.6		2310 BCE ±20		H4 tephra
5	Mount St. Helens	Cascade Volcanic Arc	1.2	Unknown	2340 BCE	4.3	Yb (Smith Creek)
5	Piton de la Fournaise	Réunion	1.8		2700 BCE		Bellecombe Ash Member
5	Ilyinsky	Kamchatka	1.3		2850 BCE		ZLT-tephra; IL-tephra
5	Água de Pau	São Miguel Island, Azores	5.4		2990 BCE		Fogo A
5	Lake Numazawa	Honshū	4.71		3400 BCE		
5	Shiveluch	Kamchatka	≥ 2		3500 BCE		
6	Mount Pinatubo	Luzon Volcanic Arc	12?	Unknown	3550 BCE	5.5	Crow Valley eruptive period
5	Shiveluch	Kamchatka	≥ 2		3650 BCE		
5	Kaguyak	SW Alaska, Aleutian Arc	3.9		3850 BCE		Caldera formation
6	Masaya Volcano	Central America Volcanic Arc, Nicaragua	14.8	Unknown	4050 BCE	6	
5	Towada	Honshū	9.18		4150 BCE		eruption episode C
5	Apoyeque	Central America Volcanic Arc, Nicaragua	1.9		4160 BCE ±30		Laguna Xiloá
5	Avachinsky	Kamchatka	≥ 4	Unknown	4340 BCE	6.3	Tephra layer IAv12; AV4
6-7	Macauley Island	Kermadec Islands	⩽ 100	Unknown	4360 BCE	6.3	
5	Shiveluch	Kamchatka	≥ 2		4400 BCE		
5	Komagatake	Hokkaidō	3		4600 BCE ±50		Ko-g
5	Nishiyama, Hachijō-jima	Izu–Bonin–Mariana Arc	1.2		4650 BCE		Mitsune-5 scoria
6	Mount Hudson	Andes, Southern Volcanic Zone	18	Unknown	4750 BCE	6.7	
5	Ksudach	Kamchatka	7.5		4900 BCE		KS2
5	Tavui	Bismarck Volcanic Arc	5.75		4946 BCE ±40		Raluan Pyroclastics
5	Hekla	Iceland	1.7		5150 BCE		H5 tephra
5	Ksudach	Kamchatka	3		5200 BCE		KS3
7	Taal Volcano	Luzon Volcanic Arc	144	90	5380 ± 70 yr BCE	5.5	Pasong Fluidal Juvenile Bomb-Rich Ignimbrite Formation
5	Ichinsky	Kamchatka	2.5		5400 BCE		
5	Shiveluch	Kamchatka	1.2		5500 BCE		
6	Lake Mashū	Hokkaidō	18.6	Unknown	5550 BCE	7.5	Ma-f/g/h/i/j
6	Khangar	Kamchatka	15	Unknown	5700 BCE	7.7	KHG tephra
5	Avachinsky	Kamchatka	9	Unknown	5980 BCE	7.9	Tephra layer IAv2
6	Menengai	East African Rift	70	Unknown	6050 BCE	8	
5	Mount Tarawera	Taupō Volcanic Zone	1.2		6060 BCE ±50		Haroharo (Te Horoa & other domes)
5	Makushin Volcano	Unalaska, Aleutian Arc	7.5		6100 BCE ±50		
6	Karkar Island	Bismarck Volcanic Arc	20	Unknown	6318 BCE	8.3	Wadau deposit
5	Kizimen	Kamchatka	4.9		6400 BCE ±50		KZII
6	Karymsky	Kamchatka	14.5	Unknown	6600 BCE	8.6	Tephra layer KRM
5	Shiveluch	Kamchatka	1		6800 BCE		
5	Mount Tarumae	Hokkaidō	1.9		6950 BCE		Ta-d
5	Shiveluch	Kamchatka	≥ 2		7150 BCE		
5	Towada	Honshū	2.5		7250 BCE		eruption episode E
5	Shiveluch	Kamchatka	≥ 1		7300 BCE		
6	Mount Pinatubo	Luzon Volcanic Arc	⩾10	Unknown	7460 BCE	9.4	Tayawan caldera, Pasbul eruptive period
5	Mount Tarawera	Taupō Volcanic Zone			7560 BCE ±18		Lake Rotoma
6	Água de Pau	São Miguel Island, Azores	11.5	Unknown	8000 BCE	10	Inner Caldera Formation
7	Semisopochnoi Island	Aleutian Arc	120	Unknown	8000 BCE	10	
5	Kizimen	Kamchatka	4		8050 BCE		KZI
6	Grímsvötn	Iceland	15	Unknown	8230 BCE	10.2	Saksunarvatn tephra
5	Lake Ngozi	Great Rift Valley, Tanzania	7		8250 BCE		Kitulo pumice
5	Towada	Honshū	1.3		8250 BCE		eruption episode F
6	Longonot	Great Rift Valley, Kenya	50	Unknown	8910 BCE	10.9	
5	Mount Tongariro	Taupō Volcanic Zone	1		9350 BCE		
5	Mount Tongariro	Taupō Volcanic Zone	1		9450 BCE		Poutu Lapilli (Mangamate)
5	Mount Tongariro	Taupō Volcanic Zone	1		9650 BCE		

== Exact year unknown ==
VEI	Volcano/complex	Volcanic arc/belt, subregion, or hotspot	Material volume bulk (km^{3})	Date (earliest est.)	Date (latest est.)	Tephra or eruption name
5	Sakurajima	Kyūshū	1	c.1471	c.1476	
5	Mount Pinatubo	Luzon Volcanic Arc	1	c.1400	c.1500	Buag eruptive period
5	El Chichón	Chiapanecan Volcanic Arc	2.8	c.1260	c.1460	
5	Ubinas	Andes, Central Volcanic Zone	2.8	c.1000	c.1164	
5	Lake Mashū	Hokkaidō	4.6	c.980	c.1180	Ma-b
5	Puyehue	Andean Volcanic Belt	4.32	c.785	c.935	MH tephra
6	Ceboruco	Trans-Mexican Volcanic Belt	10.95	c.730	c.1130	Jala Pumice
6	Taal Volcano	Luzon Volcanic Arc, Philippines	46	3000 BCE	c. 1000	Buco Ignimbrite and Tuff Formation
5	El Chichón	Chiapanecan Volcanic Arc	> 1	c.680	c.880	tephra unit D
6	Pago	Bismarck Volcanic Arc	20	c.635	c.785	Witori-Galilo tephra
5	Pago	Bismarck Volcanic Arc	6	c.600	c.780	Witori-Kimbe 4 tephra
5	Opala	Kamchatka	3.7	c.560	c.660	Baranii Amphitheatre crater
5	Pago	Bismarck Volcanic Arc	6	c.210	c.410	Witori-Kimbe 3 tephra
6	Mount Churchill	eastern Alaska	10	c.145	c.345	WRAn
6	Ksudach	Kamchatka	18.5	c.140	c.340	KS1
5	Furnas	São Miguel Island, Azores	1.54	c. 20 BCE	c.180	Tephra layer C
6	Apoyeque	Central America Volcanic Arc, Nicaragua	18	c. 150 BCE	c. 50	
5	Masaya	Central America Volcanic Arc, Nicaragua	3.4	270 BCE	70 BCE	Masaya Tuff
5	Popocatépetl	Trans-Mexican Volcanic Belt	3.2	500 BCE	c.100	I.A1 Yellow Pumice
5	Mount Meager massif	Garibaldi Volcanic Belt	⩾ 1	610 BCE	210 BCE	Bridge River eruption
5	Mount Tongariro	Taupō Volcanic Zone	1.2	750 BCE	350 BCE	
5	Khodutka	Kamchatka	1.25	1030 BCE	830 BCE	KHD tephra
5	Yantarni Volcano	SW Alaska, Aleutian Arc	1	1300 BCE	300 BCE	
6	Pago	Bismarck Volcanic Arc	30	1530 BCE	1210 BCE	Witori-Kimbe 2 tephra
5	Etna	Campanian volcanic arc	1	1550 BCE	1450 BCE	
6	Mount Aniakchak	SW Alaska, Aleutian Arc	50	1636 BCE	1446 BCE	Aniakch
5	Mount St. Helens	Cascade Volcanic Arc	3.5	1870 BCE	1670 BCE	Ye (Smith Creek) ak II
6	Mount Vesuvius	Campanian volcanic arc	2.0	2000 BCE	1500 BCE	Avellino eruption
5	Villarrica	Andean Volcanic Belt	3.3	2010 BCE	1610 BCE	Pucón Ignimbrite
6	Black Peak	SW Alaska, Aleutian Arc	30	2050 BCE	1750 BCE	
5	El Chichón	Chiapanecan Volcanic Arc	2	2130 BCE	1930 BCE	Unit K (SI; Espindola 2000) Unit E (Macias 1997)
5	Mount Galunggung	Sunda Arc, Java	1	2400 BCE	2100 BCE	
6	Mount Veniaminof	SW Alaska, Aleutian Arc	> 50	2455 BCE	2153 BCE	V2
5	Phlegraean Fields	Campanian volcanic arc	1.8	2650 BCE	1650 BCE	Agnano Monte Spina
5	Lake Ikeda	Kyūshū	2.3	2765 BCE	2615 BCE	Ikeda-ko caldera, Tephra layer Ikp
5	Shiveluch	Kamchatka	> 1	2920 BCE	2320 BCE	SHdv
6	Taal Volcano	Luzon Volcanic Arc, Philippines	46	unknown	≤ 3000 BCE	Balagbag Ignimbrite Formation
5-6	Fisher Caldera	Unimak, Aleutian Arc	5.5 (DRE)	3245 BCE	3095 BCE	Turquoise Cone
5	Chaitén	Andean Volcanic Belt	4.7	3320 BCE	2880 BCE	Cha2/Mic2 tephra
5	Avachinsky	Kamchatka	1.5	3350 BCE	3050 BCE	Tephra layer IAv20; AV3
5	Mount Tarawera	Taupō Volcanic Zone	6	3621 BCE	3431 BCE	Whakatane tephra
5	Popocatépetl	Trans-Mexican Volcanic Belt	⩾ 5	4000 BCE	3400 BCE	I.A1 Yellow Pumice
5	Apoyeque	Central America Volcanic Arc, Nicaragua	1	4050 BCE	1050 BCE	W Chiltepe Peninsula, Mateare Tephra
6	Pago	Bismarck Volcanic Arc	10	4210 BCE	3790 BCE	Witori-Kimbe 1 tephra
5	Hekla	Iceland	1	4210 BCE	4010 BCE	Hekla Ö tephra
5	Mayor Island / Tūhua	Taupō Volcanic Zone	1.6	5260 BCE	4860 BCE	Taratimi Bay
5	Puyehue	Andean Volcanic Belt	1.66	5230 BCE	4930 BCE	PU-2 tephra
7	Kikai Caldera	Ryukyu Islands	332–457 (Note: 70–80 DRE)	5353 BCE	5215 BCE	Akahoya eruption
7	Crater Lake (as Mount Mazama)	Cascade Volcanic Arc	120 (Note: 61 DRE)	5832 BCE	5734 BCE	Mazama Tephra
5-6	Crater Lake	Cascade Volcanic Arc	> 9	5950 BCE	5850 BCE	Lower Pumice, Llao Rock
6	Mount Aniakchak	Aleutian Arc	30	7550 BCE	5050 BCE	Aniakchak I
6	Tao-Rusyr Caldera	Onekotan, Kuril Islands	55	6438 BCE	6258 BCE	
7	Kurile Lake	Kamchatka	155	6462 BCE	6416 BCE	Ilinsky eruption
6	Taal Volcano	Luzon Volcanic Arc, Philippines	72	unknown	Before 6680 ± 310 BCE	Indang Banded Fluidal Juvenile Bomb Ignimbrite Formation
5	Pico de Orizaba	Trans-Mexican Volcanic Belt	1	6860 BCE	6560 BCE	Upper Citlaltépetl ignimbrite
5-6	Mount Vesuvius	Campanian volcanic arc	5.1	7040 BCE	6840 BCE	Mercato eruption
6	Okmok Caldera	Umnak, Aleutian Arc	75	8456 BCE	6096 BCE	Okmok I
6	Morne Trois Pitons	Dominica, Lesser Antilles island arc	58	7535 BCE	7347 BCE	PPR3 - Link fall
5	Shiveluch	Kamchatka	≥ 2	7550 BCE	7250 BCE	
5	Calbuco	Southern Chile & Argentina	1	7585 BCE	5935 BCE	Ca8 tephra layer
5	Chaitén	Andean Volcanic Belt	3.54	7950 BCE	7550 BCE	Cha1 tephra
5	Roundtop Volcano	Unimak, Aleutian Arc	7	8100 BCE	7100 BCE	
6	Ulleung	South Korea	28.5	8305 BCE	8227 BCE	Ulleungdo-Oki tephra
5	Taupō Volcano	Taupō Volcanic Zone	4.8	8330 BCE	7930 BCE	Unit E (Opepe Tephra)
5	Calbuco	Southern Chile & Argentina	1	8615 BCE	8305 BCE	Ca1 tephra layer
6	Lvinaya Past	Kuril Islands	75	8756 BCE	8614 BCE	
6	Aira	Kyūshū	12	9050 BCE	7050 BCE	Wakamiko Caldera
5	Askja	Iceland	3.45	9110 BCE	8710 BCE	Dyngjufjöll Tephra
7	Fisher Caldera	Unimak, Aleutian Arc	142 (Note: 10–100 DRE)	9114 BCE	8330 BCE	Fisher Tuff
5	Taupō Volcano	Taupō Volcanic Zone	1	9315 BCE	9165 BCE	4 km W of Te Kohaiakahu Point, Unit C (Poronui)
5	Taupō Volcano	Taupō Volcanic Zone	1.4	9660 BCE	9260 BCE	
5	Hijiori	Honshū	2.3	10050 BCE	9050 BCE	Obanazawa Pumice

== See also ==
- Year Without a Summer
- Volcanic winter of 536
- List of largest volcanic eruptions
- List of Quaternary volcanic eruptions
- Timeline of volcanism on Earth
