= List of Quaternary volcanic eruptions =

Clickable imagemap of notable volcanic eruptions. The apparent volume of each bubble is linearly proportional to the volume of tephra ejected, colour-coded by time of eruption as in the legend. Pink lines denote convergent boundaries, blue lines denote divergent boundaries and yellow spots denote hotspots.

This article is a list of historical volcanic eruptions of approximately magnitude 6 or more on the Volcanic Explosivity Index (VEI) or equivalent sulfur dioxide emission during the Holocene, and Pleistocene eruptions of the Decade Volcanoes (Avachinsky–Koryaksky, Kamchatka; Colima, Trans-Mexican Volcanic Belt; Mount Etna, Sicily; Galeras, Andes, Northern Volcanic Zone; Mauna Loa, Hawaii; Mount Merapi, Central Java; Mount Nyiragongo, East African Rift; Mount Rainier, Washington; Sakurajima, Kagoshima Prefecture; Santamaria/ Santiaguito, Central America Volcanic Arc; Santorini, Cyclades; Taal Volcano, Luzon Volcanic Arc; Teide, Canary Islands; Ulawun, New Britain; Mount Unzen, Nagasaki Prefecture; Mount Vesuvius, Naples); Campania, Italy; South Aegean Volcanic Arc; Laguna de Bay, Luzon Volcanic Arc; Mount Pinatubo, Luzon Volcanic Arc; Toba, Sunda Arc; Mount Meager massif, Garibaldi Volcanic Belt; Yellowstone hotspot, Wyoming; and Taupō Volcanic Zone, greater than VEI 4.

The eruptions in the Holocene on the link: Holocene Volcanoes in Kamchatka were not added yet, but they are listed on the Peter L. Ward's supplemental table. Some of the eruptions are not listed on the Global Volcanism Program timetable as well, at least not as VEI 6. The timetables of Global Volcanism Program; Bristlecone pine tree-rings (Pinus longaeva, Pinus aristata, Pinus ponderosa, Pinus edulis, Pseudotsuga menziesii); the 4 ka Yamal Peninsula Siberian larch (Larix sibirica) chronology; the 7 ka Scots pine (Pinus sylvestris) chronology from Finnish Lapland; GISP2 ice core; GRIP ice core; Dye 3 ice core; Bipolar comparison; Antarctic ice core (Bunder and Cole-Dai, 2003); Antarctic ice core (Cole-Dai et al., 1997); Crête ice core, in central Greenland, benthic foraminifera in deep sea sediment cores (Lisiecki, Raymo 2005), do not agree with each other sometimes. The 536–547 AD dust-veil event might be an impact event.

== Holocene eruptions ==
The Holocene epoch begins 11,700 years BP, (10 000 ^{14}C years ago)

=== Since 2000 AD ===
Name and area	Date	VEI	Products	Notes
Hunga Tonga–Hunga Haʻapai, Tonga	2022	5–6	6.5 km^{3} (dense-rock equivalent) of tephra	2022 Hunga Tonga–Hunga Haʻapai eruption; the largest eruption of the 21st century
Ruang, north sulawesi indonesia	2024	5		
Chaitén, Southern Chile	2008	5		
Puyehue-Cordón Caulle, Southern Chile	2011	5		2011–2012 Puyehue-Cordón Caulle eruption

=== 1000–2000 AD ===
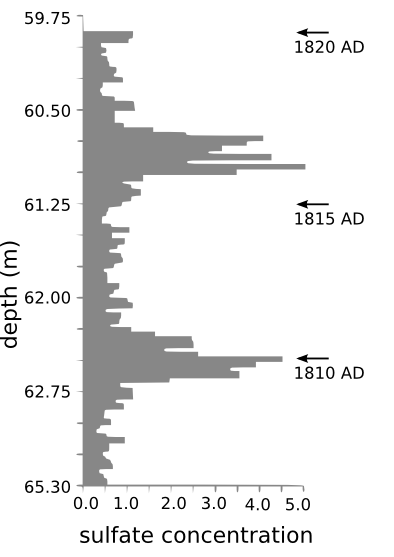
1809–10 ice core event

Name and area	Date	VEI	Products	Notes
Pinatubo, island of Luzon, Philippines	1991, Jun 15	6	6 to 16 km^{3} (1.4 to 3.8 cu mi) of tephra	1991 Pinatubo eruption; an estimated 20 million tons of sulfur dioxide were emitted
Mount St. Helens, Washington state, USA	1980, May 18	5	1 to 1.1 km^{3} (0.2 to 0.3 cu mi) of tephra	1980 Mount Saint Helens eruption
Novarupta, Alaska Peninsula	1912, Jun 6	6	13 to 15 km^{3} (3.1 to 3.6 cu mi) of lava	
Santa Maria, Guatemala	1902, Oct 24	6	20 km^{3} (4.8 cu mi) of tephra	
Mount Tarawera, Taupō Volcanic Zone, New Zealand	1886, Jun 10	5	2 km^{3} (0.48 cu mi) of tephra	1886 eruption of Mount Tarawera
Krakatoa, Indonesia	1883, August 26–27	6	21 km^{3} (5.0 cu mi) of tephra	1883 Krakatoa eruption
Mount Tambora, Lesser Sunda Islands, Indonesia	1815, Apr 10	7	160–213 km^{3} (38–51 cu mi) of tephra	1815 eruption of Mount Tambora; an estimated 10–120 million tons of sulfur dioxide were emitted, produced the "Year Without a Summer"
1808 ice core event	Unknown eruption near equator, magnitude roughly half Tambora			Emission of sulfur dioxide around the amount of the 1815 Tambora eruption (ice cores from Antarctica and Greenland).
1808 ice core event	1808	Major eruptions in Urzelina, Azores (Urzelina eruption, fissure vent), Klyuchevskaya Sopka, Kamchatka Peninsula, and Taal Volcano, Philippines.		
Grímsvötn, Northeastern Iceland	1783–1784	6		
Laki	1783–1784	6	14 cubic kilometres of lava	an estimated 120 million tons of sulfur dioxide were emitted, produced a Volcanic winter, 1783, on the North Hemisphere.
Mount Fuji, Honshu, Japan	1707–1708	5		Hōei eruption
Long Island (Papua New Guinea), northeast of New Guinea	1660 ±20	6	30 km^{3} (7.2 cu mi) of tephra	
Kolumbo, Santorini, Greece	1650, Sep 27	6	60 km^{3} (14.4 cu mi) of tephra	
Huaynaputina, Peru	1600, Feb 19	6	30 km^{3} (7.2 cu mi) of tephra	
Billy Mitchell, Bougainville Island, Papua New Guinea	1580 ±20	6	14 km^{3} (3.4 cu mi) of tephra	
Bárðarbunga, Northeastern Iceland	1477	6	10 km^{3} (2.4 cu mi) of tephra	
1452–53 ice core event, New Hebrides arc, Vanuatu. Location is uncertain, may be Kuwae			36 to 96 km^{3} (8.6 to 23.0 cu mi) of tephra	175–700 million tons of sulfuric acid; only small pyroclastic flows are found at Kuwae
Mount Tarawera, Taupō Volcanic Zone, New Zealand	1310 ± 12	5	5 km^{3} (1.2 cu mi) of tephra (Kaharoa eruption)	
Quilotoa, Ecuador	1280(?)	6	21 km^{3} (5.0 cu mi) of tephra	
Samalas volcano, Rinjani Volcanic Complex, Lombok Island, Indonesia	1257	7	40 km^{3} (dense-rock equivalent) of tephra	1257 Samalas eruption; Arctic and Antarctic ice cores provide compelling evidence to link the ice core sulfate spike of 1258/1259 A.D. to this volcano.

=== 1 to 1000 AD ===
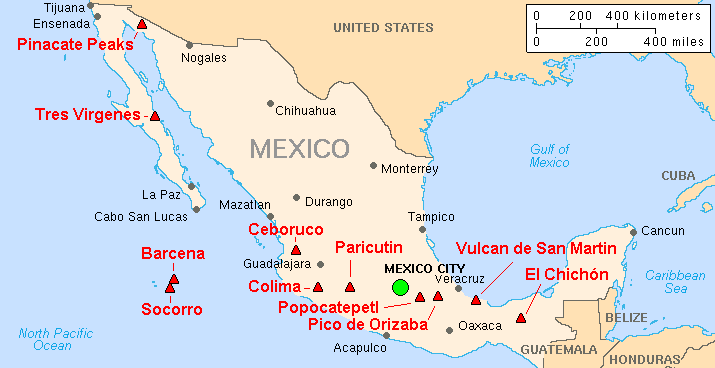
Major volcanoes of Mexico

Paektu Mountain, border of North Korea and China	946 AD	6	40 to 98 km^{3} (9.6 to 23.5 cu mi) of tephra	Tianchi eruption; also known as Millennium Eruption of Changbaishan
Eldgjá eruption, Laki system, Iceland	934–940 AD	6	Estimated 18 km^{3} (4.3 cu mi) of lava	Estimated 219 million tons of sulfur dioxide were emitted
Ceboruco, Northwest of the Trans-Mexican Volcanic Belt	930 AD ±200	6	11 km^{3} (2.6 cu mi) of tephra	
Dakataua, Northern tip of the Willaumez Peninsula, New Britain, Papua New Guinea	800 AD ±50	6?	10 km^{3} (2.4 cu mi)? of tephra	
Pago, East of Kimbe, New Britain, Papua New Guinea: Witori Caldera	710 AD ±75	6	30 km^{3} (7.2 cu mi) of tephra	
Mount Churchill, eastern Alaska	700 AD ±200	6	20 km^{3} (4.8 cu mi) of tephra	
Rabaul, Rabaul Caldera, New Britain	540 AD ±100	6	11 km^{3} (2.6 cu mi) of tephra	Volcanic winter of 536?
Ilopango, El Salvador	431 AD ±2, or 539/540 AD	7	106.5 km3 (25.5 cu mi) of tephra	Tierra Blanca Joven eruption
Ksudach, Kamchatka Peninsula, Russia	240 AD ±100	6	20 to 26 km^{3} (4.8 to 6.2 cu mi) of tephra	
Taupō Volcano, Taupō Volcanic Zone, New Zealand	230 AD ±16	7	120 km^{3} (29 cu mi) of tephra	Hatepe eruption
Mount Vesuvius, Italy	79 AD Oct 24 (?)	5?	2.8 to 3.8 km^{3} (0.7 to 0.9 cu mi) of tephra	Eruption of Mount Vesuvius in 79 AD; responsible for the destruction of Pompeii and Herculaneum
Mount Churchill, eastern Alaska	60 AD ±200	6	25 km^{3} (6.0 cu mi) of tephra	
Ambrym, Vanuatu	50 AD ±100	6	60 to 80 km^{3} (14.4 to 19.2 cu mi) of tephra	

=== Before the Common Era (BC/BCE) ===
Name and area	Date	VEI	Products	Notes
Okmok, Okmok Caldera, Aleutian Islands	44 BC	6	40 to 60 km^{3} (9.6 to 14.4 cu mi) of tephra	
Apoyeque, Nicaragua	50 BC ±100	6	18 km^{3} (4.3 cu mi) of tephra	
Raoul Island, Kermadec Islands, New Zealand	250 BC ±75	6	more than 10 km^{3} (2.4 cu mi) of tephra	
Mount Meager massif, Garibaldi Volcanic Belt, Canada	400 BC ±50	5		
Mount Tongariro, Taupō Volcanic Zone, New Zealand	550 BC ±200	5	1.2 km^{3} (0.29 cu mi) of tephra	
Hekla, southern Iceland	c. 1000 BC	5		Hekla 3 eruption
Pinatubo, island of Luzon, Philippines	1050 BC ±500	6	10 to 16 km^{3} (2.4 to 3.8 cu mi) of tephra	
Avachinsky, Kamchatka	1350 BC (?)	5	more than 1.2 km^{3} (0.29 cu mi) of tephra	tephra layer IIAV3
Pago, east of Kimbe, New Britain, Papua New Guinea: Witori Caldera	1370 BC ±100	6	30 km^{3} (7.2 cu mi) of tephra	
Taupō Volcanic Zone, Taupō, New Zealand	1460 BC ±40	6	17 km^{3} (4.1 cu mi) of tephra	
Avachinsky, Kamchatka	1500 BC (?)	5	more than 3.6 km^{3} (0.86 cu mi) of tephra	tephra layer AV1
Santorini (Thera), Greece, Youngest Caldera	1610 BC ±14 years	7	123 km^{3} (30 cu mi) of tephra	Minoan eruption; ended the Minoan settlement at Akrotiri and the Minoan age on Crete
Mount Aniakchak, Alaska Peninsula	1645 BC ±10	6	more than 50 km^{3} (12 cu mi) of tephra	Severe global cooling
Veniaminof, Alaska Peninsula	1750 BC (?)	6	more than 50 km^{3} (12 cu mi) of tephra	
Mount St. Helens, Washington, USA	1860 BC (?)	6	15 km^{3} (3.6 cu mi) of tephra	
Mount Hudson, Cerro, Southern Chile	1890 BC (?)	6	more than 10 km^{3} (2.4 cu mi) of tephra	
Black Peak, Alaska Peninsula	1900 BC ±150	6	10 to 50 km^{3} (2.4 to 12.0 cu mi) of tephra	
Long Island (Papua New Guinea), Northeast of New Guinea	2040 BC ± 100	6	more than 11 km^{3} (2.6 cu mi) of tephra	
Mount Vesuvius, Italy	2420 BC ±40	5?	3.9 km^{3} (0.94 cu mi) of tephra	Avellino eruption
Avachinsky, Kamchatka	3200 BC ±150	5	more than 1.1 km^{3} (0.26 cu mi) of tephra	tephra layer IAv20 AV3
Pinatubo, island of Luzon, Philippines	3550 BC (?)	6	10 to 16 km^{3} (2.4 to 3.8 cu mi) of tephra	
Talisay (Taal) caldera (size: 15 x 20 km), island of Luzon, Philippines	3580 BC ±200	7	150 km^{3} (36 cu mi) of tephra	
Haroharo Caldera, Taupō Volcanic Zone, New Zealand	3580 BC ±50	5	2.8 km^{3} (0.67 cu mi) of tephra	
Pago, New Britain	4000 BC ± 200	6?	10 km^{3} (2.4 cu mi)? of tephra	
Masaya Volcano, Nicaragua	4050 BC (?)	6	more than 13 km^{3} (3.1 cu mi) of tephra	
Avachinsky, Kamchatka	4340 BC ±75	5	more than 1.3 km^{3} (0.31 cu mi) of tephra	tephra layer IAv12 AV4
Macauley Island, Kermadec Islands, New Zealand	4360 BC ±200	6	100 km^{3} (24 cu mi)? of tephra	
Mount Hudson, Cerro, Southern Chile	4750 BC (?)	6	18 km^{3} (4.3 cu mi) of tephra	
Mount Aniakchak, Alaska Peninsula	5250 BC ±1000	6	10 to 50 km^{3} (2.4 to 12.0 cu mi) of tephra	
Kikai Caldera (size: 19 km), Ryukyu Islands, Japan	5350 BC (?)	7	80 to 220 km^{3} (19.2 to 52.8 cu mi) of tephra	Akahoya eruption
Mashu, Hokkaido, Japan	5550 BC ±100	6	19 km^{3} (4.6 cu mi) of tephra	
Tao-Rusyr Caldera, Kuril Islands	5550 BC ±75	6	30 to 36 cubic kilometers (7.2 to 8.6 cu mi) of tephra	
Mayor Island / Tūhua, Taupō Volcanic Zone, New Zealand	5060 BC ±200	5	1.6 km^{3} (0.38 cu mi) of tephra	
Crater Lake (Mount Mazama), Oregon, USA	5677 BC ±150	7	150 km^{3} (36 cu mi) of tephra	
Khangar, Kamchatka Peninsula, Russia	5700 BC ± 16	6	14 to 16 km^{3} (3.4 to 3.8 cu mi) of tephra	
Crater Lake (Mount Mazama), Oregon, USA	5900 BC ± 50	6	8 to 28 km^{3} (1.9 to 6.7 cu mi) of tephra	
Avachinsky, Kamchatka	5980 BC ±100	5	more than 8 to 10 km^{3} (1.9 to 2.4 cu mi) of tephra	tephra layer IAv1
Menengai, East African Rift, Kenya	6050 BC (?)	6	70 km^{3} (17 cu mi)? of tephra	
Haroharo Caldera, Taupō Volcanic Zone, New Zealand	6060 BC ±50	5	1.2 km^{3} (0.29 cu mi) of tephra	
Sakurajima, island of Kyūshū, Japan: Aira Caldera	6200 BC ±1000	6	12 km^{3} (2.9 cu mi) of tephra	
Kurile Caldera (size: 8 x 14 km), Kamchatka Peninsula, Russia	6440 BC ± 25 years	7	140 to 170 km^{3} (33.6 to 40.8 cu mi) of tephra	Ilinsky eruption
Karymsky, Kamchatka Peninsula, Russia	6600 BC (?)	6	50 to 350 km^{3} (12.0 to 84.0 cu mi) of tephra	
Mount Vesuvius, Italy	6940 BC ±100	5?	2.75 to 2.85 km^{3} (0.7 to 0.7 cu mi) of tephra	Mercato eruption
Fisher Caldera, Unimak Island, Aleutian Islands	7420 BC ±200	6	more than 50 km^{3} (12 cu mi) of tephra	
Pinatubo, island of Luzon, Philippines	7460 BC ±150	6–7?		
Lvinaya Past, Kuril Islands	7480 BC ±50	6	7 to 8 km^{3} (1.7 to 1.9 cu mi) of tephra	
Rotomā Caldera, Taupō Volcanic Zone, New Zealand	7560 BC ±18	5	more than 5.6 km^{3} (1.3 cu mi) of tephra	
Taupō Volcano, Taupō Volcanic Zone, New Zealand	8130 BC ±200	5	4.7 km^{3} (1.1 cu mi) of tephra	
Grímsvötn, Northeastern Iceland	8230 BC ±50	6	more than 15 km^{3} (3.6 cu mi) of tephra	
Ulleung, Korea	8750 BC (?)	6	more than 10 km^{3} (2.4 cu mi) of tephra	
Mount Tongariro, Taupō Volcanic Zone, New Zealand	9450 BC (?)	5	1.7 km^{3} (0.41 cu mi) of tephra	
Taupō Volcano, Taupō Volcanic Zone, New Zealand	9460 BC ±200	5	1.4 km^{3} (0.34 cu mi) of tephra	
Mount Tongariro, Taupō Volcanic Zone, New Zealand	9650 BC (?)	5	1.6 km^{3} (0.38 cu mi) of tephra	
Nevado de Toluca, State of Mexico, Trans-Mexican Volcanic Belt	10.5 ka	6	14 km^{3} (3.4 cu mi) of tephra	Upper Toluca Pumice
GISP2 ice core event	11.258 ka			

== Pleistocene eruptions ==
2.588 ± 0.005 million years BP, the Quaternary period and Pleistocene epoch begin.

Name and area	Date	VEI	Products	Notes
GISP2 ice core event	12.657 ka			
Eifel hotspot, Laacher See, Vulkan Eifel, Germany	12.900 ka	6	6 km^{3} (1.4 cu mi) of tephra.	
Mount Vesuvius, Italy	16 ka	5		Green Pumice
Mount Vesuvius, Italy	18.3 ka	6		Basal Pumice
Santorini (Thera), Greece: Cape Riva Caldera	about 21 ka			
Aira Caldera, south of the island of Kyūshū, Japan	about 22 ka	7	more than 400 km^{3} (96.0 cu mi) of tephra.	
Taupō Volcanic Zone, Oruanui eruption, Taupō Volcano, New Zealand	around 25.6 ka	8	Approximately 1,170 km^{3} (280.7 cu mi) of tephra	
Laguna Caldera (size: 10 x 20 km), South-East of Manila, island of Luzon	27–29 ka			
Alban Hills, Rome, Italy	36 ka	4	Peperino Ignimbrite of Albano Maar	Sedimentation and mobility of PDCs: a reappraisal of ignimbrites’ aspect ratio
Campi Flegrei, Naples, Italy	39.280 ka ± 0.11		200 cubic kilometres of lava	Campanian Tuff
Galeras, Andes, Northern Volcanic Zone, Colombian department of Nariño	40 ka		2 km^{3} (0.5 cu mi) of tephra	
Taupō Volcanic Zone, Rotoiti Ignimbrite, North Island, New Zealand	about 50 ka	7	about 240 km^{3} (57.6 cu mi) of tephra.	
Santorini (Thera), Greece: Skaros Caldera	about 70 ka			
Lake Toba (size: 100 x 30 km), Sumatra, Indonesia	73.7 ka ± 0.3	8	2,500 to 3,000 km^{3} (599.8 to 719.7 cu mi) of tephra	estimated 150 to 1,000 million tons of sulfur dioxide were emitted (Youngest Toba Tuff).
Aso Caldera, Kumamoto Prefecture, Japan	90 ka	8	930 to 1,860 km^{3} (223.1 to 446.2 cu mi) of tephra	The largest known eruption in Japan
Yellowstone hotspot: Yellowstone Caldera	between 70 and 150 ka		1,000 km^{3} (239.9 cu mi) intracaldera rhyolitic lava flows.	
Galeras, Andes, Northern Volcanic Zone, Colombian department of Nariño	150 ka		2 km^{3} (0.5 cu mi) of tephra	
Kos-Nisyros Caldera, Greece	161 ka		110 km^{3} (26 cu mi)	Kos Plateau Tuff.
Taal Caldera, island of Luzon, Philippines	between 500 and 100 ka	6	?	6 Explosive Eruptions formed multiple overlapping calderas.
Santorini (Thera), Greece: Southern Caldera	about 180 ka			
Taupō Volcanic Zone, Rotorua Caldera (size: 22 km wide), New Zealand	220 ka		more than 340 km^{3} (81.6 cu mi) of tephra.	
Taupō Volcanic Zone, Maroa Caldera (size: 16 x 25 km), New Zealand	230 ka		140 km^{3} (33.6 cu mi) of tephra.	
Taupō Volcanic Zone, Reporoa Caldera (size: 10 x 15 km), New Zealand	230 ka	7	around 100 km^{3} (24.0 cu mi) of tephra	
Taupō Volcanic Zone, Whakamaru Caldera (size: 30 x 40 km), North Island, New Zealand	around 254 ka	8	1,200 to 2,000 km^{3} (288 to 480 cu mi) of tephra	Whakamaru Ignimbrite/Mount Curl Tephra
Taupō Volcanic Zone, Matahina Ignimbrite, Haroharo Caldera, North Island, New Zealand	280 ka	7	about 120 km^{3} (28.8 cu mi) of tephra.	
Alban Hills, Rome, Italy	365–351 ka	6	Villa Senni Ignimbrite >50km3	Volcanoes of the World: Third Edition
Sabatini volcanic complex, Sabatini, Italy	374 ka	7	more than 200 km^{3} (48 cu mi)	Morphi tephra.
Roccamonfina Caldera (size: 65 x 55 km), Roccamonfina, Italy	385 ka		100 to 125 km^{3} (24.0 to 30.0 cu mi) of tephra.	
Alban Hills, Rome, Italy	407–398 ka	6	Pozzolane Nere Ignimbrite	
Alban Hills, Rome, Italy	456–439 ka	7	Pozzolane Rosse Tephritic Ignimbrite >50km3	Sedimentation and mobility of PDCs: a reappraisal of ignimbrites’ aspect ratio
Maipo (volcano), Andes, Southern Volcanic Zone, Chile	450–500 ka	7	Diamante Caldera	
Galeras, Andes, Northern Volcanic Zone, Colombian department of Nariño	560 ka		15 km^{3} (3.6 cu mi) of tephra	
Lake Toba, Sumatra, Indonesia	501 ka ±5			Middle Toba Tuff
Yellowstone hotspot: Yellowstone Caldera (size: 45 x 85 km)	640 ka	8	more than 1,000 km^{3} (240 cu mi) of tephra	Lava Creek Tuff
Lake Toba, Sumatra, Indonesia	840 ka ±30			Oldest Toba Tuff
Taupō Volcanic Zone, Mangakino Caldera, North Island, New Zealand	0.97 Ma		more than 300 km^{3} (72.0 cu mi)	Rocky Hill Ignimbrite
Taupō Volcanic Zone, Mangakino Caldera, North Island, New Zealand	1.01 Ma		more than 300 km^{3} (72.0 cu mi)	Unit E
Lake Toba, Sumatra, Indonesia	1.2 ±0.16 Ma			Haranggoal Dacite Tuff
Taupō Volcanic Zone, Mangakino Caldera, North Island, New Zealand	1.23 Ma		more than 300 km^{3} (72.0 cu mi)	Ongatit Ignimbrite
Yellowstone hotspot: Henry's Fork Caldera (size: 16 km wide)	1.3 Ma	7	280 km^{3} (67.2 cu mi)	Mesa Falls Tuff.
Yellowstone hotspot: Island Park Caldera (size: 100 x 50 km)	2.1 Ma	8	2,450 km^{3} (588 cu mi)	Huckleberry Ridge Tuff.
Cerro Galán Caldera, Argentina (size: 35 x 20 km)	2.2 Ma	8	1,000 km^{3} (240 cu mi) of dacitic magma.	

== Notes ==
Iceland: volcanoes

Volcanism in Iceland

- Iceland has four volcanic zones: Reykjanes (Mid-Atlantic Ridge), West and North Volcanic Zones (RVZ, WVZ, NVZ) and the East Volcanic Zone (EVZ). The Mid-Iceland Belt (MIB) connects them across central Iceland. There are two intraplate belts too (Öræfajökull (ÖVB) and Snæfellsnes (SVB)).
  - Iceland's East Volcanic Zone: the central volcanoes of Vonarskard and Hágöngur belong to the same volcanic system; this also applies to Bárðarbunga and Hamarinn, and Grímsvötn and Þórðarhyrna.
    - Laki is part of a volcanic system, centering on the Grímsvötn volcano (Long NE-SW-trending fissure systems, including Laki, extend from the central volcano).
    - The Eldgjá canyon and the Katla volcano form another volcanic system. Although the Eldgjá canyon and the Laki fissure are very near from each other, lava from the Katla and the Hekla volcanic systems result in transitional alkalic basalts and lava from the central volcanoes result in tholeiitic basalts.
    - The central volcano of Bárðarbunga, the Veidivötn and Trollagigar fissures form one volcanic system, which extend about 100 km SW to near Torfajökull volcano and 50 km NE to near Askja volcano, respectively. The subglacial Loki-Fögrufjöll volcanic system located SW of Bárðarbunga volcano is also part of the Bárðarbunga volcanic system and contains two subglacial ridges extending from the largely subglacial Hamarinn central volcano (15 km southwest of Bárðarbunga); the Loki ridge trends to the NE and the Fögrufjöll ridge to the SW.
- New Zealand, North Island, Taupō Volcanic Zone:
  - The following Volcanic Centers belong to the Taupō Volcanic Zone: Rotorua, Ōkataina, Maroa, Taupō, Tongariro and Mangakino. It includes Mangakino volcano, Reporoa Caldera, Mount Tarawera, Mount Ruapehu, Mount Tongariro and Whakaari / White Island. The Taupō Volcanic Zone forms a southern portion of the active Lau-Havre-Taupō back-arc basin, which lies behind the Kermadec-Tonga subduction zone (Hikurangi Trough – Kermadec Trench – Tonga Trench). Some lakes in the area: Taupo, Rotorua, Rotomahana, and Rerewhakaaitu. Lake Ōkataina, Lake Tarawera, Lake Rotokakahi (Green Lake), Lake Tikitapu (Blue Lake), Lake Okareka, and Lake Rotoiti lie within the Ōkataina Caldera.
  - Taupō Volcanic Zone, the Mangakino Volcanic Center is the westernmost and oldest rhyolitic caldera volcano in the Taupō Volcanic Zone. Mangakino is a town too.
  - Taupō Volcanic Zone, Maroa Volcanic Center. The Maroa Caldera formed in the Northeast corner of the Whakamaru Caldera. The Whakamaru Caldera partially overlaps with the Taupō Caldera on the South. The Orakeikorako, Ngatamariki, Rotokaua, and Wairakei hydrothermal areas are located within or adjacent to the Whakamaru caldera. Whakamaru is a town too.
  - The oldest volcanic zone in the North Island is the Northland Region, then the Coromandel Volcanic Zone (CVZ), then the Mangakino caldera complex and the Kapenga Caldera and then the rest of the Taupō Volcanic Zone (TVZ).
- Santorini, South Aegean Volcanic Arc. The southern Aegean is one of the most rapidly deforming regions of the Himalayan-Alpine mountain belt (Alpide belt).
- The twin volcanoes of Nindirí and Masaya lie within the massive Pleistocene Las Sierras pyroclastic shield volcano.
- There are two peaks in the Colima volcano complex: Nevado de Colima (4,330 m), which is older and inactive, lies 5 km north of the younger and very active 3,860 m Volcán de Colima (also called Volcán de Fuego de Colima).
- The largely submarine Kuwae Caldera cuts the flank of the Late Pleistocene or Holocene Tavani Ruru volcano, the submarine volcano Karua lies near the northern rim of Kuwae Caldera.
- Bismarck volcanic arc, the Rabaul Caldera includes the sub-vent of Tavurvur and the sub-vent of Vulcan.
- Bismarck volcanic arc, Pago volcano, New Britain, Papua New Guinea, is a young post-caldera cone within the Witori Caldera. The Buru Caldera cuts the SW flank of the Witori volcano.
- Sakurajima, Kyūshū, Japan, is a volcano of the Aira Caldera.
- The Mount Unzen volcanic complex, East of Nagasaki, Japan, comprises three large stratovolcanoes with complex structures, Kinugasa on the North, Fugen-dake at the East-center, and Kusenbu on the South.

=== Nomenclature ===
Each state/ country seem to have a slightly different approach, but there is an order:

- Craton, and then Province as sections or regions of a craton.
- First: volcanic arc, volcanic belt and volcanic zone.
- Second: volcanic area, caldera cluster and caldera complex.
- Third: volcanic field, volcanic system and volcanic center.
  - A volcanic field is a localized area of the Earth's crust that is prone to localized volcanic activity.
  - A volcanic group (aka a volcanic complex) is a collection of related volcanoes or volcanic landforms.
- Neutral: volcanic cluster and volcanic locus.

In the Basin and Range Province the volcanic fields are nested. The McDermit volcanic field, is also named Orevada rift volcanic field. The Latir-Questa volcanic locus and the Taos Plateau volcanic field seem to be in a similar area. The Southwest Nevada volcanic field, the Crater Flat-Lunar Crater volcanic zone, the Central Nevada volcanic field, the Indian Peak volcanic field and the Marysvale volcanic field seem to have no transition between each other; the Ocate volcanic field is also known as the Mora volcanic field; and the Red Hill volcanic field is also known as Quemado volcanic field.
