= Tierra Blanca Joven eruption =

Catastrophic volcanic eruption of Lake Ilopango in El Salvador

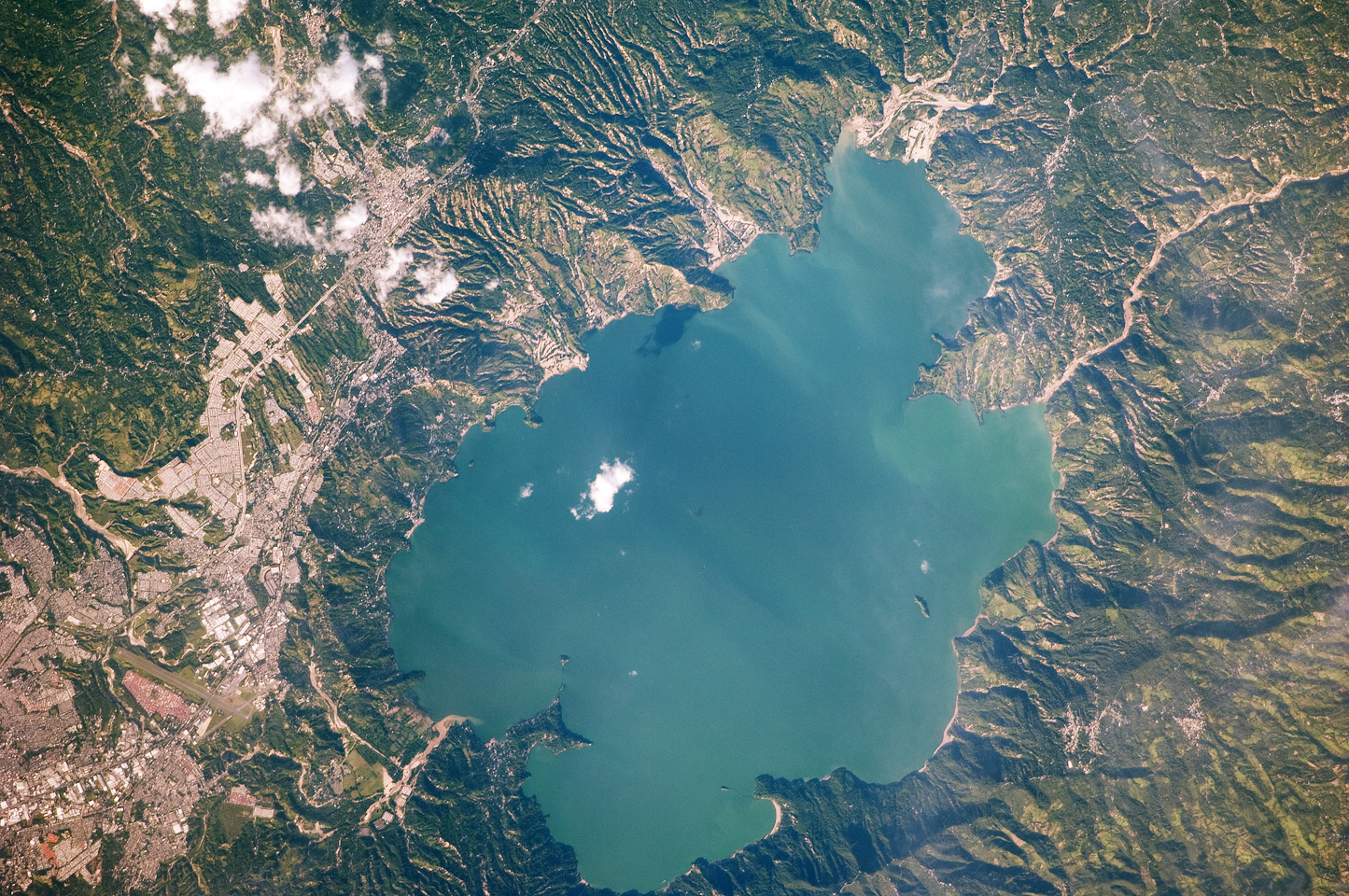
- The eruption created an 8 by 11 km (5.0 by 6.8 mi) lake-filled caldera known as Lake Ilopango.
- Volcano: Lake Ilopango
- Date: 431±2 CE
- Type: Ultra-Plinian
- Location: El Salvador, Central America; 13.67°N 89.05°W
- VEI: 6

Maps
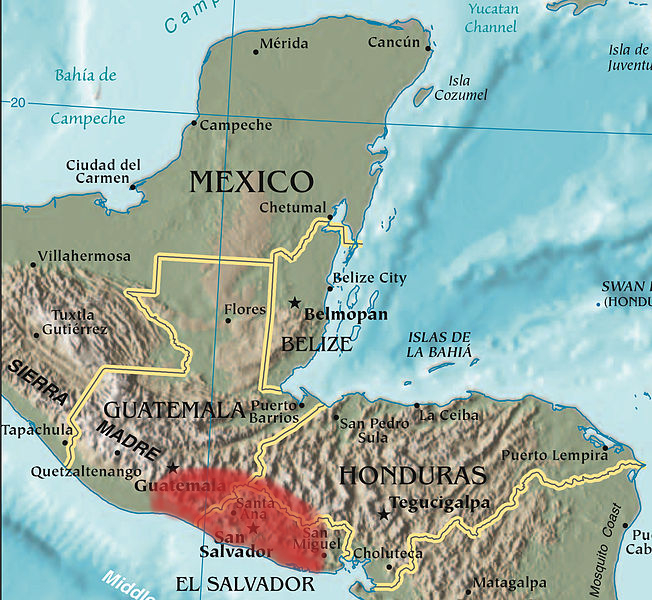
- {{{map-caption}}}

The Tierra Blanca Joven eruption of Lake Ilopango was the largest volcanic eruption in El Salvador during historic times, and one of the largest volcanic events on Earth in the past 7,000 years, registering at 6 on the Volcanic explosivity index (VEI), and dating back to the mid 5th century A.D. The eruption produced between 37–82 km^{3} (8.9–19.7 mi^{3}) of ejecta (dense-rock equivalent). The date of the eruption has been constrained within 429–433 CE by identifying its signature volcanic ash in precision-dated ice cores sampled from Greenland, thus eliminating it as the cause of extreme weather events of 535–536.

== Volcanic eruption ==
The Tierra Blanca Joven eruption is El Salvador's largest volcanic eruption in the last 10,000 years. This VEI-6 Plinian eruption occurred during the 5th century and was larger than the 1883 eruption of Krakatoa or the 1991 eruption of Mount Pinatubo, having probably been more comparable to the 1815 eruption of Mount Tambora. It produced about 104–207 km^{3} (25–50 cu mi) of tephra (several times as much as the 1980 eruption of Mount St. Helens), produced major pyroclastic fall and large pyroclastic flows that covered 10,000 km^{2} (3,900 mi^{2}) with over 50 cm (20 in) of pumice and ash, and nearly 2,000,000 km^{2} (770,000 sq mi) with a blanket of ash at least 0.5 cm (0.20 in) in depth. The eruption devastated an area of up to 100 km (62 mi) radius around the volcano. The Tierra Blanca Joven eruption is one of the largest volcanic events in recorded history.

== See also ==
- 1257 Samalas eruption
- 1815 eruption of Mount Tambora
- List of large Holocene volcanic eruptions
- Volcanic winter
- Year Without a Summer
