= Jiboa River =

River in El Salvador

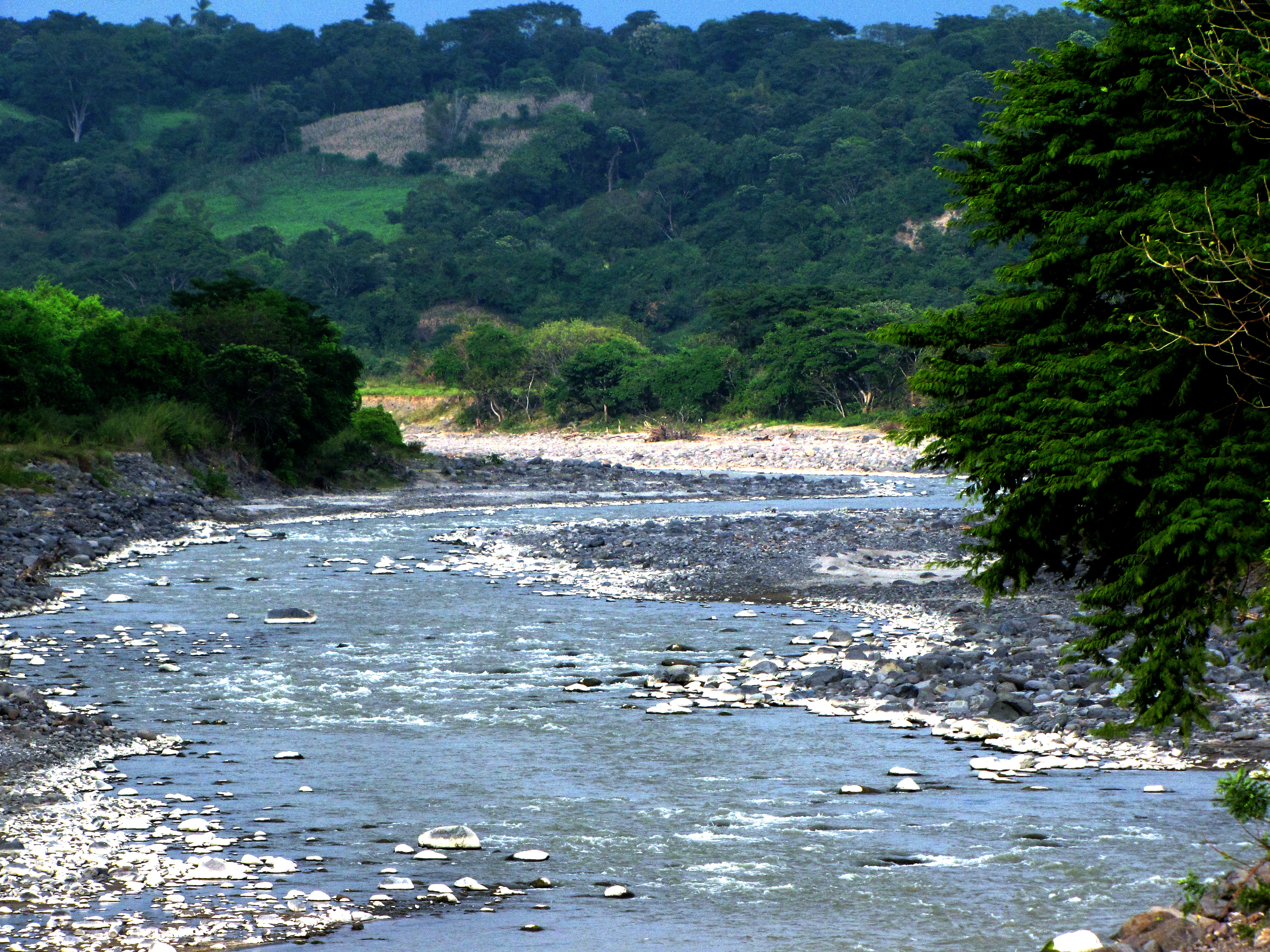

- Location within El Salvador
- Native name: Rio Jiboa (Spanish)

Location
- Country: El Salvador
- Department: La Paz

Physical characteristics
- Mouth
  - location: Pacific Ocean
  - coordinates: 13°21′32″N 89°02′16″W

Jiboa River is a river of El Salvador. The river sources from Lake Ilopango and drains into the Pacific Ocean.
