= Peter Langdon Ward =

American geophysicist

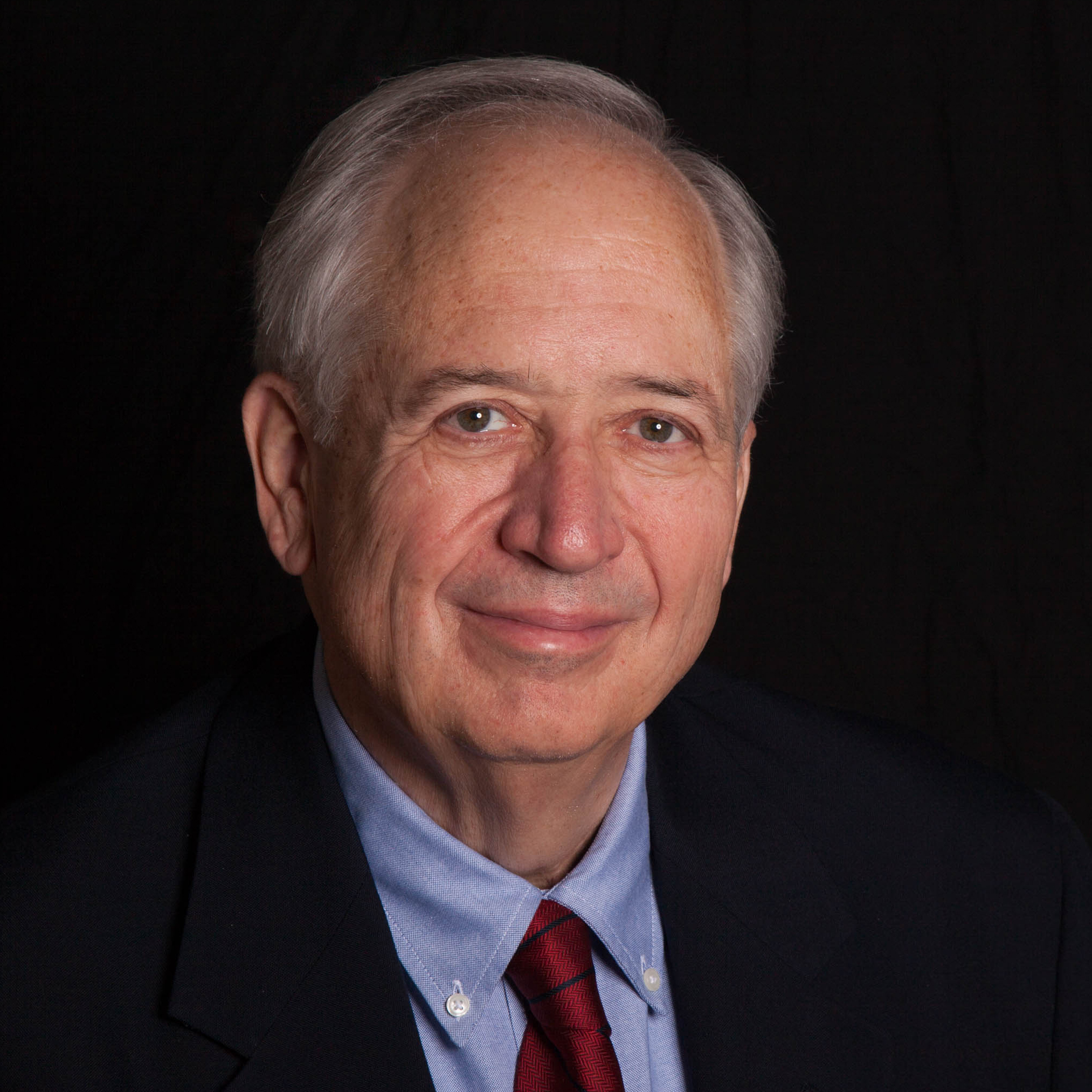
- Born: August 10, 1943 (age 83); Washington D.C., United States
- Education: Dartmouth College; Columbia University
- Scientific career
- Fields: Earthquakes, volcanism, regional plate tectonics
- Workplaces: U.S. Geological Survey

Peter Langdon Ward is a geophysicist specializing in seismology and volcanology.

== Life and work ==
Ward is an American earth scientist and geophysicist who has studied microearthquakes associated with active fault systems and volcanic eruptions throughout the western United States, Alaska, Hawaii, Iceland, Central America, and the East African Rift System. He developed a prototype global volcano surveillance system that relayed data through the ERTS satellite. He was born August 10, 1943, in Washington, D.C., and was educated at the Noble and Greenough School (1955–1961), Dartmouth College (BA 1965), and Columbia University (MA, 1967, PhD 1970).

In January 1975, he was appointed chief of the Branch of Seismology, a group of 140 scientists and staff at the United States Geological Survey in Menlo Park, California, playing a lead role in the development of, and initial management of, the National Earthquake Hazards Reduction Program. This Branch became the Branch of Earthquake Mechanics and Prediction, conducting scientific research aimed at predicting the time of occurrence of damaging earthquakes at a time when such research appeared promising worldwide.

Ward contributed to an understanding of how geologic records of volcanism in western North America relate in detail to motions of tectonic plates under the eastern Pacific Ocean.

== Ozone Depletion ==
In a 2009 paper, Ward suggested that "large volumes of S O_{2} erupted frequently appear to overdrive the oxidizing capacity of the atmosphere resulting in very rapid warming." In addition, he noted that sulfur dioxide is a strong absorber of visible light. He proposed that the rapid increase in global warming during the 20th century was caused by these mechanisms as a result of the rapid increase in sulfur dioxide emitted by the burning of fossil fuels. Since 2009 Ward has been arguing that climate change is caused by ozone depletion and not human-derived CO_{2} emissions, a hypothesis that is not supported by referred literature.

== Selected publications ==
- Ward, Peter (1991). "On plate tectonics and the geologic evolution of southwestern North America". J. Geophys. Res. 96 (B7): 12479–12496. Bibcode:1991JGR....9612479W. doi:10.1029/91jb00606.
