= Ksudach =

Stratovolcano in southern Kamchatka, Russia

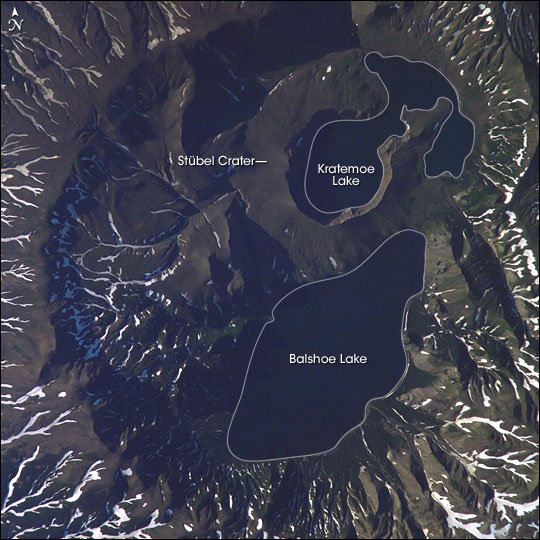
- The summit area of Ksudach Volcano

Highest point
- Elevation: 1,079 m (3,540 ft)
- Coordinates: 51.80°N 157.53°E

Geography
- Location within Kamchatka Krai
- Location: Kamchatka Peninsula, Russia
- Parent range: Eastern Range

Geology
- Mountain type: Stratovolcano
- Last eruption: March 1907

Ksudach (Russian: Ксудач) (also known as Vonyuchy Khrebet Volcano) is a stratovolcano in southern Kamchatka, Russia. The last eruption of Ksudach was in March 1907, on or around 28 March, which was one of the largest ever recorded in Kamchatka with a Volcanic Explosivity Index of 5. The summit area comprises overlapping calderas. Two lakes, Bolshoe and Kraternoe, are located within calderas at the summit of Ksudach. These lakes, along with hot springs and the surrounding wilderness, make the Ksudach Volcano region a popular trekking destination. In the event of renewed volcanic activity, its remote location minimizes its potential hazard to humans.

== Eruptive history ==
Ksudach has experienced five known collapse events that created its system of nested calderas. Two of those (Calderas I and II) occurred during the late Pleistocene, while three smaller collapses (Calderas III, IV, and V) occurred during the Holocene. Known eruptions have been dated to 8700–8800, 6100, 6000, and 1700–1800 years B.P through radiocarbon dating.

Ksudach experienced a major caldera-forming eruption at approximately 240 A.D. The eruption ejected an estimated 18–19 km^{3} (4.3–4.6 cu mi) of material with a dense-rock equivalent of 8 km^{3} (1.9 mi^{3}), creating a caldera (Caldera V) approximately 4 km × 6.5 km (2.5 mi × 4.0 mi) in size.

About a hundred years after the formation of Caldera V, a cone, known as Shtyubel' Cone, began to grow within the caldera. Three known explosive eruptions have occurred with the cone, with erupted material ranging from andesites to dacites and rhyodacites. The last eruption of Ksudach occurred from this cone in 1907.

The 1907 eruption occurred on or around 28 March and was one of the largest ever recorded in Kamchatka, with a Volcanic Explosivity Index of 5 and a volume of ejected ash at 2.4 km^{3} (0.58 cu mi). The eruption generated pyroclastic flows with an estimated volume of 0.15 km^{3} (0.036 mi^{3}) which was spread out over an area of 115 km^{2} (44 mi^{2}), which was followed by a round of pyroclastic surges with an estimated volume of 0.2 km^{3} (0.048 mi^{3}) and which deposits cover an area of 160 km^{2} (62 mi^{2}) The 1907 eruption sent ash high into the atmosphere which was transported by the jet stream, leaving North America east of the Rocky Mountains unseasonably cold.

== See also ==
- List of volcanoes in Russia
