= 946 eruption of Mount Paektu =

Major volcanic eruption in Korea

Coordinates: 41.9931°N 128.0769°E

946 AD eruption of Mount Paektu
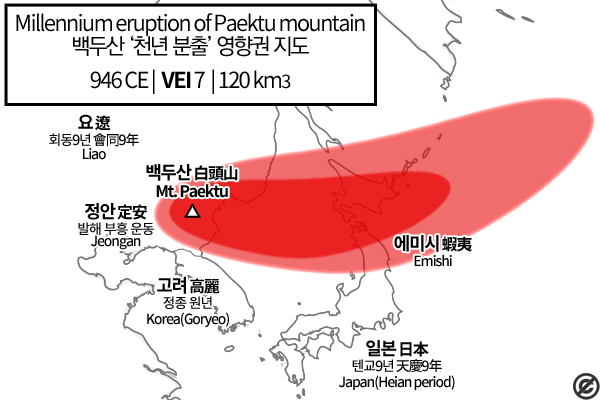
- Volcano: Mount Paektu
- Date: late 946 AD
- Type: Ultra-Plinian
- Location: Jilin, China and Ryanggang Province, North Korea
- VEI: 6 or 7
- Impact: At least short-term regional climate changes

The 946 AD eruption of Mount Paektu, a stratovolcano on the border of North Korea and China also known as Changbaishan, occurred in late 946 AD. This event is known as the Millennium Eruption or Tianchi eruption. It is one of the most powerful volcanic eruptions in recorded history; classified at the most conservative estimate as a VEI 6, and in others, as a VEI 7.

The eruption ejected about 13–47 cubic kilometres of magma (dense rock equivalent) and formed a caldera, which now contains a lake (Heaven Lake). The eruption had two phases that each included a Plinian fallout and a pyroclastic flow and erupted magmas that were different in composition. An average of 5 cm (2.0 in) of Plinian ashfall and co–ignimbrite ashfall covered about 1,500,000 km^{2} (580,000 sq mi) of the Sea of Japan and northern Japan. This ash layer has been named the "Baegdusan-Tomakomai ash" (B-Tm) and is valuable marker horizon for correlating regional sedimentary archives in and around the Sea of Japan. The Millennium Eruption was one of the largest and most powerful eruptions in the last 5,000 years, along with the Minoan eruption of Thera, the Hatepe eruption of Lake Taupō (around 230 AD), the 431 AD eruption of Lake Ilopango, the 1257 eruption of Mount Samalas near Mount Rinjani, and the 1815 eruption of Mount Tambora.

== Date ==
The eruption ash layer is an invaluable marker horizon for dating and correlating regional to global sedimentary archives, as evidence of the eruption is found throughout the Sea of Japan. Therefore, the timing of this eruption was one of the most intensely studied subject in the volcanology of Mount Paektu, before its final settlement in the late 946 AD.

=== Radiocarbon dating ===
A precise radiocarbon date for the Millennium Eruption was achieved by obtaining numerous radiocarbon measurements across the stumps of trees that were felled and carbonised during the eruption. These radiocarbon measurements were wiggle-matched onto the calibration curve to constrain the date to between to 938–946 AD. Further constraints on the date were obtained when the major 774-775 AD carbon-14 spike (Miyake event) was identified in one of the tree stumps felled by the eruption. Exactly 172 rings were counted between this 774-775 AD Miyake event and the bark edge implying that the tree was killed in 946 CE. This date supports that obtained from the Greenland ice core age model. The comenditic and trachytic volcanic glass shards with chemical fingerprints associated with the Millennium eruption were located in the Greenland ice core, and the position corresponds to a date of 946–947 AD. The tree stump with preserved rings and the 774-775 AD Miyake event, and the identification of the tephra layer in the precisely dated Greenland ice cores indicate an unambiguous date of 946 AD for the Millennium Eruption.

=== Historical accounts ===
Several meteorological phenomena recorded in ancient Korea and Japan during the mid-10th century may have been caused by the Millennium Eruption. The Nihon Kiryaku (Japan Chronicle):

On 19 February 944 AD, around midnight, shaking, sounds above.

Another similar but later record from the Goryeosa (History of Goryeo) describes, at the palace in Kaesŏng, of a loud disturbance:

In the first year of the reign of Emperor Jeongjong (946 AD), heaven's drums sounded. That year the sky rumbled and cried out, there was an amnesty.

Kaesŏng is approximately 470 km from Paektu volcano, a distance over which the Millennium Eruption may have been heard. In addition, the Annals of Kōfukuji recorded a particularly interesting observation in Nara, Japan:

On 3 November 946 AD, evening, white ash fell gently like snow.

The "white ash" may have been the white, comenditic, first phase of the B-Tm ash fall. Three months later, the Dai Nihon Kokiroku (Old Diaries of Japan) and Nihon Kiryaku (Japan Chronicle) both documented a loud disturbance on the same day:

On 7 February 947 AD, there was a sound in the sky, like thunder.

=== Ice-core and tree-ring ===
Ice core chronology and tree ring dating allows extremely precise dating to the exact calendar year of any ice depth in the Common Era or any tree ring with virtually no age uncertainty. Rhyolitic and trachytic volcanic glass shards with chemical fingerprints of that of Millennium magma were found at an ice depth dated precisely to 946–947 AD, effectively confirming that the eruption occurred within the last 3 months of 946 AD.

Further confirmation came from studies of tree rings from a subfossil larch that was engulfed and killed during the initial explosive eruption. The tree was alive and recorded the atmospheric chemical changes during the major 774 AD carbon-14 spike. Between this event and the outermost ring, there are exactly 172 rings, implying that the tree was killed in 946 AD. This provides an unambiguous date for the Millennium Eruption.

== Eruption dynamics ==
Extensive studies of the sedimentary record of the Millennium Eruption revealed that the eruption had two phases, both generating widespread tephra fallout and pyroclastic flows. The first phase began with a Plinian eruption that produced widely dispersed comenditic tephra followed by unwelded pyroclastic flows and surges. After a hiatus of unknown duration, the second phase produced trachytic agglutinates and welded pyroclastic flow and surge deposits.

=== Phase 1 (comendite magma) ===
The first phase began with a stable Plinian eruption column which was estimated to have reached a height of 30–40 km and produced a widely dispersed layer of light coloured pumice fallout. The pumice fallout layer is then immediately overlain, no co-occurring as indicated by lack of interbedding, by massive pyroclastic flows that covered an area of 2,000 km^{2} (770 square miles) with an average thickness of 5 m (16 feet) and reached a distance as far as 50 km (31 miles). These pyroclastic flows were generated by the collapse of the Plinian eruption column. A co-ignimbrite ash layer, generated from elutriation during pyroclastic flow, overlies the pyroclastic flows, representing the topmost deposition from this eruption phase. The magma composition of this phase was predominantly comenditic and of distinct light grey colour. The mass eruption rate of this phase has been estimated to be 1-4 × 10^{8} kg/s. Based on the historical records of falling white ash in Nara, it is suggested that the first phase may have started on 2 November 946 AD.

=== Phase 2 (trachyte magma) ===
There are still disputes over what pyroclastic products were emplaced during the second phase, and whether there was a significant period of quiescence between the first and the second phase. At multiple locations, non-pyroclastic materials or erosion separates the first and second phase eruptive products, indicating an eruption hiatus.

Unlike the first phase, this phase began with pulsing eruptions from non-sustained columns characterised by frequent column collapses, depositing multiple tephra fall units of alternating colour and interbedded with co-occurring pyroclastic flows from column collapsing. As many as seven fall units are recognised in this phase. Fallout were also deposited as high-temperature agglutinates mantling the inner caldera wall. The pyroclastic flows of this phase filled paleovalleys in all directions within a radius of 20 km (12 miles) of the caldera. The uppermost part of the second phase deposits is also a co-ignimbrite ash layer. There was widespread ash dispersal associated with this trachytic phase, and modelling suggests that the eruption plume extended >30 km in altitude and the mass eruption rate was larger than 10^{8} kg/s.

== Eruption volume ==
Based on the proximal and distal thicknesses of the deposit, it was estimated that the fallout volume was between 13.4 and 37.4 km^{3} Dense Rock Equivalent (DRE) of magma, and the pyroclastic density current (PDC) volume was around 6.2-7.8 km^{3} DRE. These estimates place the bulk volume of the eruption to be between 40.2 and 97.7 km^{3}, which equates to 17.5 to 42.5 km^{3} DRE magma (using a tephra deposit density of 1000 kg/m^{3} and a magma density of 2300 kg/m^{3}). Tephra dispersal models were recently used with tephra fallout thicknesses from both phases to constrain the eruption parameters and volumes of the two separate phases. Between 3 and 16 km^{3} (best estimate of 7.2 km^{3}) of DRE magma was dispersed by the first comenditic phase, and 4-20 km^{3} (best estimate of 9.3 km^{3}) during the second trachytic phase of the eruption. When the PDC volumes are considered with these updated fallout volumes, the total volumes are around 23 km^{3} DRE magma – similar to the amount of material removed from the edifice to generate a caldera.

== Volatile release ==
Large volcanic eruptions can inject a large amount of volatiles and aerosols into the atmosphere, leading to volcanic winter and environmental changes.

The amount of volatiles released by an eruption, such as fluorine, chlorine, and sulfur, was assessed by taking the amount of the volatile element dissolved in the magma when it was crystallising and taking off the amount still in the magma when it erupted. Bodies of magma often become trapped in the crystals during crystallisation forming melt inclusions, which are analysed to determine the original volatile concentration. The remaining amount of the volatile dissolved in the melt is established by analysing the matrix glass – the magma quenched on eruption. The difference in the volatile element between the MI and matrix glass is then multiplied by the volume of the melt to estimate the amount of the volatiles that are released into the atmosphere.

Fluorine, chlorine, and sulfur contents of MI and matrix glasses have been measured for the comenditic magma erupted in the first phases of the eruption. Using these average volatile contents in the MI and matrix glass combined with the comendite magma volume (3-17 km^{3} DRE) the volatile release was between 5 and 30 Tg S, 6-32 Tg F, and 2-15 Tg Cl. The fluorine and chlorine contents of MI and matrix glasses cover a similar range, suggesting the melts were probably not saturated in either element, and loss of these volatile phases could be negligible. The low S yield is consistent with ice core records that estimated the S load was ~2 Tg based on the non-sea salt sulphate record, and the limited climate impact recorded in palaeoenvironmental and palaeoclimate proxies

== Climate effects ==
The Millennium Eruption is thought to have emitted an enormous mass of volatiles into the stratosphere, likely resulting in a major worldwide climatic impact, though more recent studies indicate that the Millennium Eruption of Mt. Paektu volcano may have been limited to regional climatic effects. However, there are some meteorological anomalies in A.D. 945–948 which may relate to the Millennium Eruption. The event is thought to have caused a volcanic winter.

Date	Meteorological anomaly	Source
4. Apr, 945	It snowed heavily	Old History of the Five Dynasties
28. Nov, 946	Glaze ice	Old History of the Five Dynasties
7. Dec, 946	Large scale frost and fog, and rime covered all plants	Old History of the Five Dynasties
31. Jan, 947	It snowed over ten days, and caused inadequate food supply and famine	Old History of the Five Dynasties, Zizhi Tongjian
24. Feb, 947 until 23. Apr, 947	Warm spring	Japanese historical meteorological materials
14. May, 947	Frost, and cold as harsh winter	Japanese historical meteorological materials
16. Dec, 947	Glaze ice	Old History of the Five Dynasties
25. Dec, 947	Glaze ice	Old History of the Five Dynasties
6. Jan, 948	Glaze ice	Old History of the Five Dynasties
24. Oct, 948	It snowed in Kaifeng	Old History of the Five Dynasties

== See also ==
- El Chichón, 1982
- 1883 eruption of Krakatoa
- 1815 eruption of Mount Tambora
