= Akahoya eruption =

Ultra-Plinian eruption in Kyushu, Japan, at around 6,500 BP

- Volcano: Kikai Caldera
- Date: Between 7165 and 7303 years cal BP
- Type: Ultra-Plinian
- Location: Kyūshū, Japan; 30.789°N 130.308°E
- Volume: 332–457 km^{3} (80–110 cu mi)
- VEI: 7
- Impact: One of only six confirmed eruptions of its size in the Holocene; dramatically changed vegetation in Southern Kyūshū and impacted on the Jōmon culture

Maps
- Affected areas of the eruption

The Akahoya eruption or Kikai-Akahoya eruption was the strongest known volcanic eruption of the Kikai Caldera in Kyūshū, Japan occurring c. 5250 BCE. It ejected 332–457 km^{3} (80–110 cu mi) of volcanic material, giving it a Volcanic Explosivity Index of 7.

== Context ==
The Kikai Caldera had erupted around 94,000 years before in the smaller Nagase eruption, and that was preceded around 140,000 years ago by the Koabiyama eruption.

== Eruption sequence ==
There is evidence of volcanic activity at the Kikai Caldera in what is termed the K–Km tephra layers between 16–9 cal ka BP. The Takeshima debris avalanche followed by the Nagahama lava (NgL) and Heikejo ash (K–Hj) events preceded the eruption. The eruption proper then started with a Plinian eruption of VEI 6 (K–KyP), which ejected the Koya (Funakura) pumice fall. The sequence from then on lasted at least 28 hours. In the latter half of this Plinian eruption, the plume collapsed and an intra-plinian flow, the Funakura pyroclastic flow (K–Fn), occurred. The total volume of K-KyP and K-Fn is estimated to be 40 km^{3} (9.6 cu mi). This was quickly followed by the ultimate caldera-forming Akahoya Phreatoplinian eruption of VEI 7. This eruption was caused by the contact between magma and seawater, forming a huge plume. The Koya (Takeshima) Pyroclastic Flow occurred as a large-scale pyroclastic flow depositing ignimbrite (K–Ky), and the Kikai-Akahoya Volcanic Ash (K–Ah) as a widespread tephra covered Honshū, Okinawa, and the Southern Korean Peninsula. As a result of this eruption, a double caldera measuring 20 km × 17 km (12 mi × 11 mi) was formed at Kikai Volcano.

After the Funakura Pyroclastic Flow, a large earthquake (Ah1) occurred near the Kikai Caldera before the Koya Pyroclastic Flow occurred. Soil liquefaction occurred on Yakushima and Tanegashima due to the large shaking. Furthermore, a second large earthquake (Ah2) occurred while the Kikai-Akahoya Volcanic Ash was falling, and soil liquefaction occurred on the Satsuma Peninsula and Ōsumi Peninsula.

A megatsunami occurred either at the very end of the eruption or shortly thereafter. Tsunami deposits were formed over a wide area along the coast of Western Japan, certainly up to 300 km (190 mi) away where some Kikai-Akahoya tephra was deposited after the tsunami, which was not the case closer to the eruption. The cause of the tsunami is not well understood, but one possibility given the timings would be collapse of the caldera rim.

=== Deposits ===
The total bulk volume of the eruption is now estimated at 133–183 km^{3} (32–44 cu mi) DRE, about double previous estimates, noting that the headline volume estimates at 332–457 km^{3} (80–110 cu mi) relate to lighter deposits such as pumice, than typical for lava that is used in DRE calculations. The eruption was partially submarine and a fuller understanding of its character required the realisation that part of the pyroclastic density current had been transformed into a subaqueous density current that contributed to a total seafloor deposit volume of 71 km^{3} (17 cu mi). The caldera bottom itself is 300–500 m (980–1,640 ft) under the sea, and most of the land deposits that are easier to study commence from about 40 km (25 mi) from the caldera. The depth of some of the eruption is important as seafloor-hugging density currents are not described in shallow underwater settings. Ignimbrite deposits on land exist with a volume of 5 km^{3} (1.2 cu mi), and the widespread tephra which is now known to cover an area of 4,500 km^{2} (1,700 sq mi) has a volume of 249–374 km^{3} (60–90 cu mi). The main climactic ignimbrite is largely dry, so not all the main eruption happened from vents that remained underwater or were underwater. Previous studies of mainly land-based tephra deposits had led to uncorrected volume estimates of 150 km^{3} (36 cu mi) later increased to 170 km^{3} (41 cu mi). These were later analysed to give dense rock equivalents so the Koya (Takeshima) Pyroclastic Flow (K–Ky) with its estimated total volume in three phrases of 30–45 km^{3} (7.2–10.8 cu mi) was assigned a DRE volume of 15–25 km^{3} (3.6–6.0 cu mi). The Kikai-Akahoya Volcanic Ash (K–Ah) with a volume of 100 km^{3} (24 cu mi) gave a DRE volume of 50 km^{3} (12 cu mi). Until the presence of a subaqueous density current was understood, a VRE of 7.2 had been estimated, with a total DRE volume of 70–80 km^{3} (17–19 cu mi) Sea level would have been lower than present at the time of the eruption but would have reached present levels within a thousand years. The magma chamber that fed the majority of the eruption is estimated to be 3–7 km (1.9–4.3 mi) below the surface.

== Retrospective dating ==
Archaeologically it has been dated around 7,300 cal. BP during the earliest stage of the Jōmon period, but it had also been uncorrected radiocarbon dated to as recently as 6,500 BP. The current accepted calibrated dating adjustment from multiple other sources is between 7165 and 7303 years before present.

== Aftermath ==
This eruption has been linked to the end of the initial Jōmon culture in southern Kyūshū, but its impact, although marked, was not as great as some commentary had suggested with Nishinozono sub-type pottery tradition, that had started prior maintained throughout and after the eruption sequence in Kyūshū. It took nearly 1,000 years to recover. Jōmon who lived further away survived such as on northern Kyūshū, Honshū and Hokkaidō but likely had to revert for a period to maritime food sources mainly.

The fate of the initial Jōmon culture on south Kyūshū does not quite parallel the demise of the Minoan civilization, which may have ended as a consequence of another massive volcanic eruption.

These events give more credence to cultural traditions that maintain stories of established cultures vanishing quickly and completely. However, while the demises happened in (Holocene) human history, in two very different parts of the world, the time scales of both were more gradual than some work suggests, allowing alternative suggestions as to all the mechanisms involved. The associated issues have resulted in deeper study into the effects of volcanic activity on both human cultural development and social perception of volcanic risk.
