= 1815 eruption of Mount Tambora =

Catastrophic volcanic eruption in Indonesia in 1815

1815 Eruption of Mount Tambora
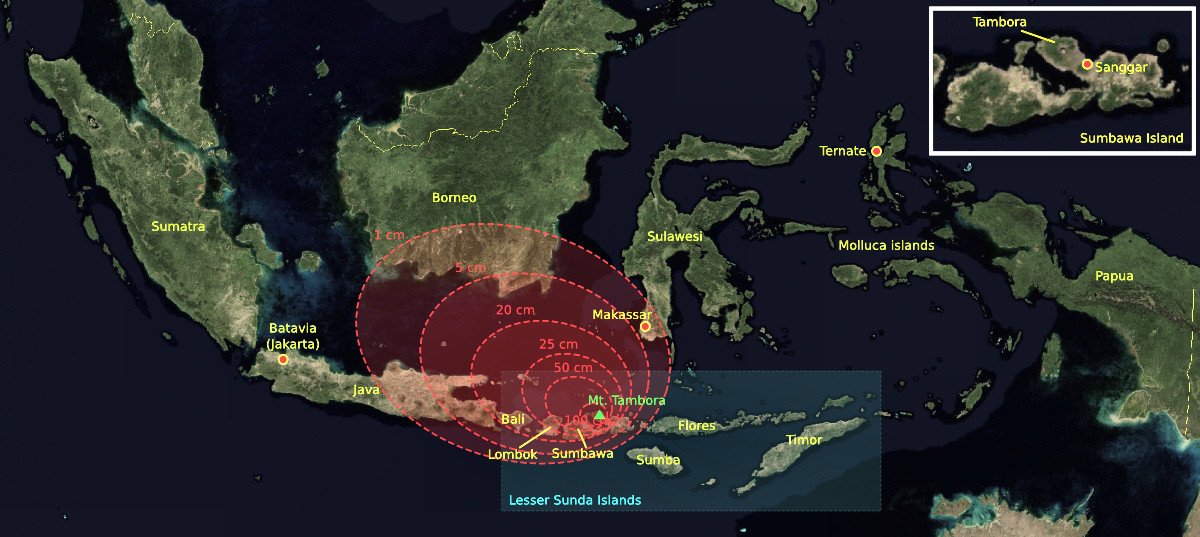
- Impact range of the 1815 Tambora Explosion
- Volcano: Mount Tambora
- Start date: 1812
- End date: 15 July 1815; 211 years ago
- Type: Ultra-Plinian
- Location: Sumbawa, Lesser Sunda Islands, Dutch East Indies (now Indonesia); 8.25°S 118.00°E
- Volume: 37–45 km^{3} (8.9–10.8 cu mi)
- VEI: 7
- Impact: 10,000 to 11,000 deaths from direct volcanic effects; 49,000 to 90,000 deaths from post-eruption famine and epidemic diseases on Sumbawa, Lombok and Bali; reduced global temperatures in the following year which led to famine in numerous regions

In April 1815, Mount Tambora, a volcano on the island of Sumbawa in present-day Indonesia (then part of the Dutch East Indies), erupted in what is now considered the most powerful volcanic eruption in recorded human history. This eruption, with a volcanic explosivity index (VEI) of 7, ejected 37–45 km^{3} (8.9–10.8 cubic miles) of dense-rock equivalent (DRE) material into the atmosphere, and was the most recent confirmed VEI-7 eruption.

Although the Mount Tambora eruption reached a violent climax on 10 April 1815, increased steaming and small phreatic eruptions occurred during the next six months to three years. The ash from the eruption column dispersed around the world and lowered global temperatures in an event sometimes known as the Year Without a Summer in 1816. This brief period of significant climate change triggered extreme weather and harvest failures in many areas around the world. Several climate forcings coincided and interacted in a systematic manner that has not been observed after any other large volcanic eruption since the early Stone Age.

== Chronology of the eruption ==
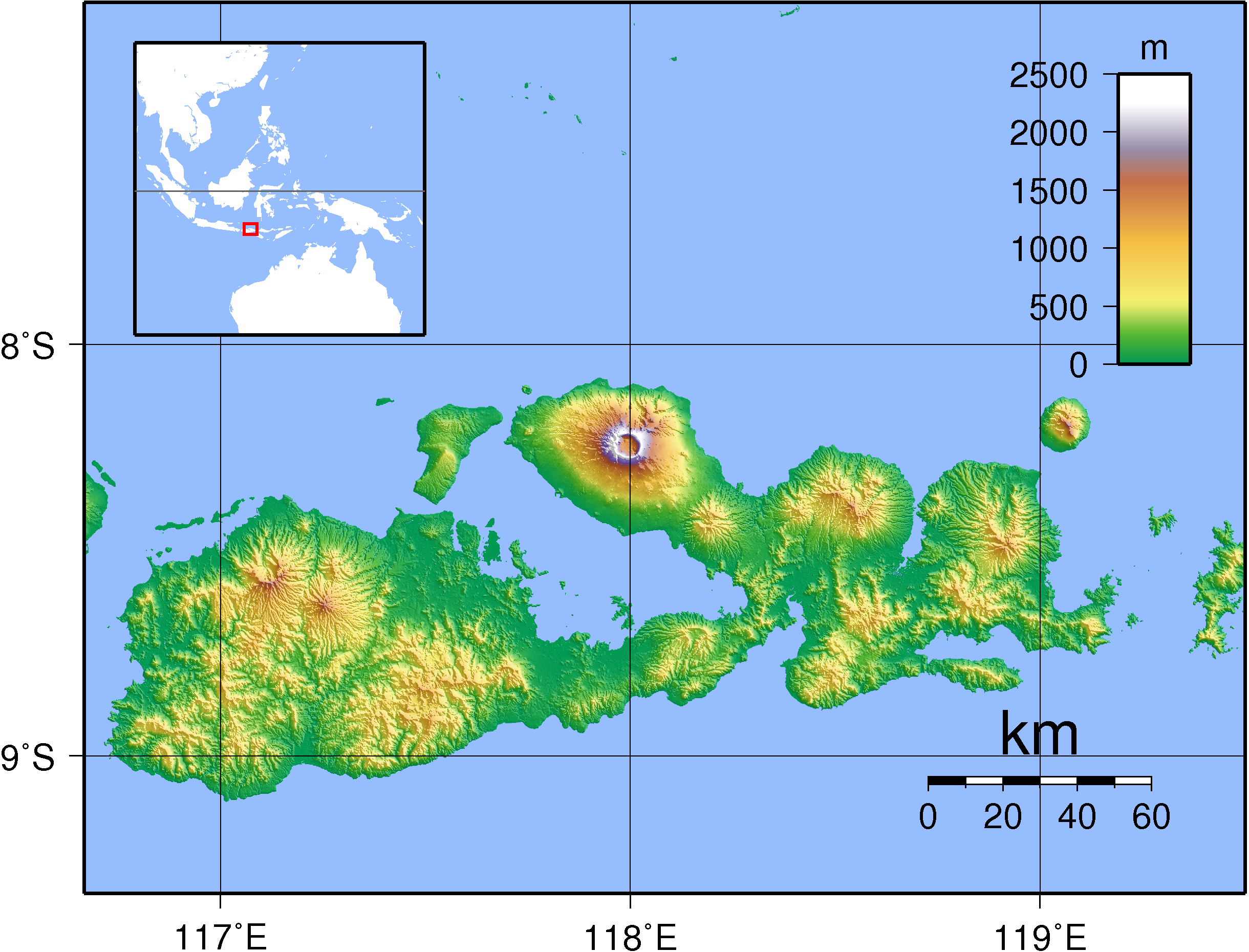
Current topography of Sumbawa, Mount Tambora in the centre, the largest mountain

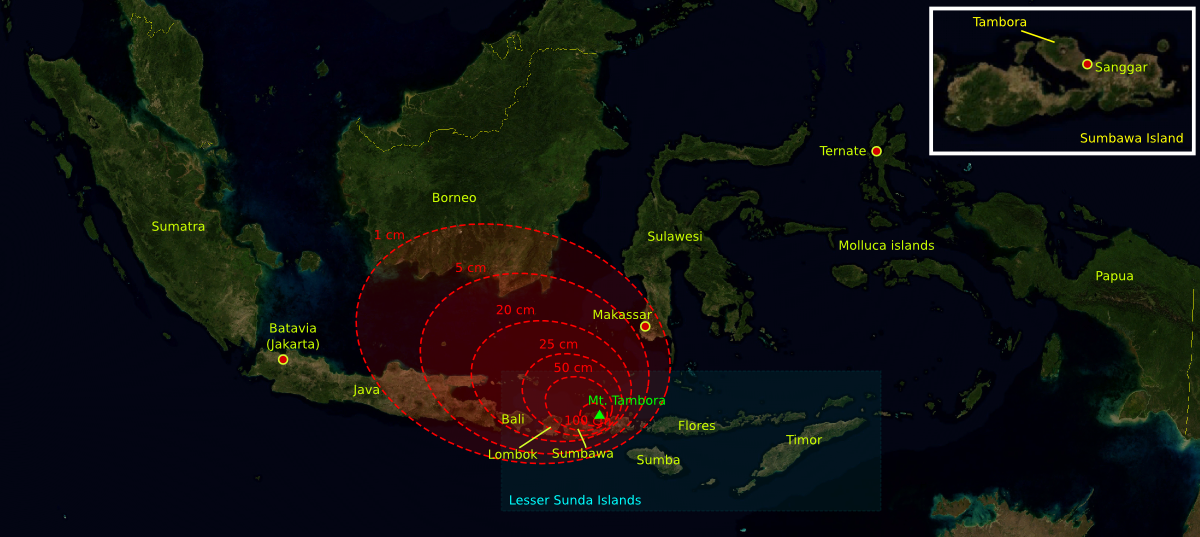
The estimated volcanic ashfall regions during the 1815 eruption. The red areas show thickness of volcanic ash fall. The outermost region (1 cm (1/2 in) thickness) reached Borneo and Sulawesi.

Mount Tambora experienced several centuries of dormancy before 1815, caused by the gradual cooling of hydrous magma in its closed magma chamber. Inside the chamber at depths between 1.5 and 4.5 km (5,000 and 15,000 ft), the exsolution of a high-pressure fluid magma formed during cooling and crystallisation of the magma. An over-pressurization of the chamber of about 4,000–5,000 bar (400–500 MPa; 58,000–73,000 psi) was generated, with the temperature ranging from 700–850 °C (1,290–1,560 °F). In 1812, the volcano began to rumble and generated a dark cloud. On 5 April 1815, a giant eruption occurred, followed by thunderous detonation sounds heard in Makassar on Sulawesi 380 km (240 mi) away, Batavia (now Jakarta) on Java 1,260 km (780 mi) away, and Ternate on the Molucca Islands 1,400 km (870 mi) away. On the morning of 6 April, volcanic ash began to fall in East Java with faint detonation sounds lasting until 10 April. What was first thought to be the sound of firing guns was heard on 10 April in Trumon, Sumatra, more than 2,600 km (1,600 mi) away. New analysis and agreements in dates suggest the rumbles of Tambora were heard even farther in Nong Khai (modern-day Thailand) at 3,352 km (2,083 mi) away, Vientiane (modern-day Laos) at 3,368 km (2,093 mi) away, and perhaps Mukdahan (Thailand) at 3,117 km (1,937 mi) away.

At about 7:00 p.m. on 10 April, the eruptions intensified. Three plumes rose up and merged. The whole mountain was turned into a flowing mass of "liquid fire". Pumice stones of up to 20 cm (8 in) in diameter started to rain down around 8:00 p.m., followed by ash at around 9:00–10:00 p.m. Soon after, a violent whirlwind ensued, which hit the village of Saugur (now Sangar), blowing down nearly every house and carrying everything it encountered into the air, including large trees. Pyroclastic flows cascaded down the mountain to the sea on all sides of the peninsula, wiping out the village of Tambora, and affecting a total area on land of about 874 km^{2} (337 sq mi). A moderate-sized tsunami struck the shores of various islands in the Indonesian archipelago on April 10th, with a height of up to 4 m (13 ft) in Sanggar around 10:00 p.m. A tsunami of 1–2 m (3–7 ft) in height was reported in Besuki, East Java, before midnight, and one of 2 m (7 ft) in height in the Molucca Islands. The total of tsunami related deaths has been estimated to be around 4,600. Loud explosions were heard until the next evening, 11 April. The ash veil spread as far as West Java and South Sulawesi. A nitrous odor was noticeable in Batavia, and heavy tephra-tinged rain fell, finally receding between 11 and 17 April.

The first explosions were heard on this Island in the evening of 5 April, they were noticed in every quarter, and continued at intervals until the following day. The noise was, in the first instance, almost universally attributed to distant cannon; so much so, that a detachment of troops was marched from Djocjocarta, in the belief that a neighbouring post was being attacked, and along with the coast, boats were in two instances dispatched in quest of a supposed ship in distress.

— Sir Stamford Raffles' memoir.

The explosion had an estimated VEI of 7. An estimated 41 km^{3} (10 cu mi) of pyroclastic trachyandesite were ejected, weighing about 10 billion tonnes. This left a caldera measuring 6–7 km (3 1/2–4 1/2 mi) across and 600–700 m (2,000–2,300 ft) deep. The density of fallen ash in Makassar was 636 kg/m^{3} (39.7 lb/cu ft). Before the explosion, Mount Tambora's peak elevation was about 4,300 m (14,100 ft), making it one of the tallest peaks in the Indonesian archipelago. The explosion dropped its peak height by about one-third, to only 2,851 m (9,354 ft).

The 1815 Tambora eruption is the largest observed eruption in recorded history, as shown in the table below. The explosion was heard at least 2,600 km (1,600 mi) away and possibly over 3,350 km (2,080 mi) away, and ash fell at least 1,300 km (810 mi) away.

== Aftermath ==
On my trip towards the western part of the island, I passed through nearly the whole of Dompo and a considerable part of Bima. The extreme misery to which the inhabitants have been reduced is shocking to behold. There were still on the road side the remains of several corpses, and the marks of where many others had been interred: the villages almost entirely deserted and the houses fallen down, the surviving inhabitants having dispersed in search of food. ... Since the eruption, a violent diarrhoea has prevailed in Bima, Dompo, and Sang'ir, which has carried off a great number of people. It is supposed by the natives to have been caused by drinking water which has been impregnated with ashes; and horses have also died, in great numbers, from a similar complaint.

— Lt. Philips, ordered by Sir Stamford Raffles to go to Sumbawa

All vegetation on the island was destroyed. Uprooted trees, mixed with pumice ash, washed into the sea and formed rafts up to 5 km (3 mi) across. Between 1 and 3 October, the British ships Fairlie and James Sibbald encountered extensive pumice rafts about 3,600 km (2,200 mi) west of Tambora. Clouds of thick ash still covered the summit on 23 April. Explosions ceased on 15 July, although smoke emissions were observed as late as 23 August. Activity resumed in August 1819—a small eruption with "flames" and rumbling aftershocks, and was considered to be part of the 1815 eruption. This eruption was recorded at 2 on the VEI scale.

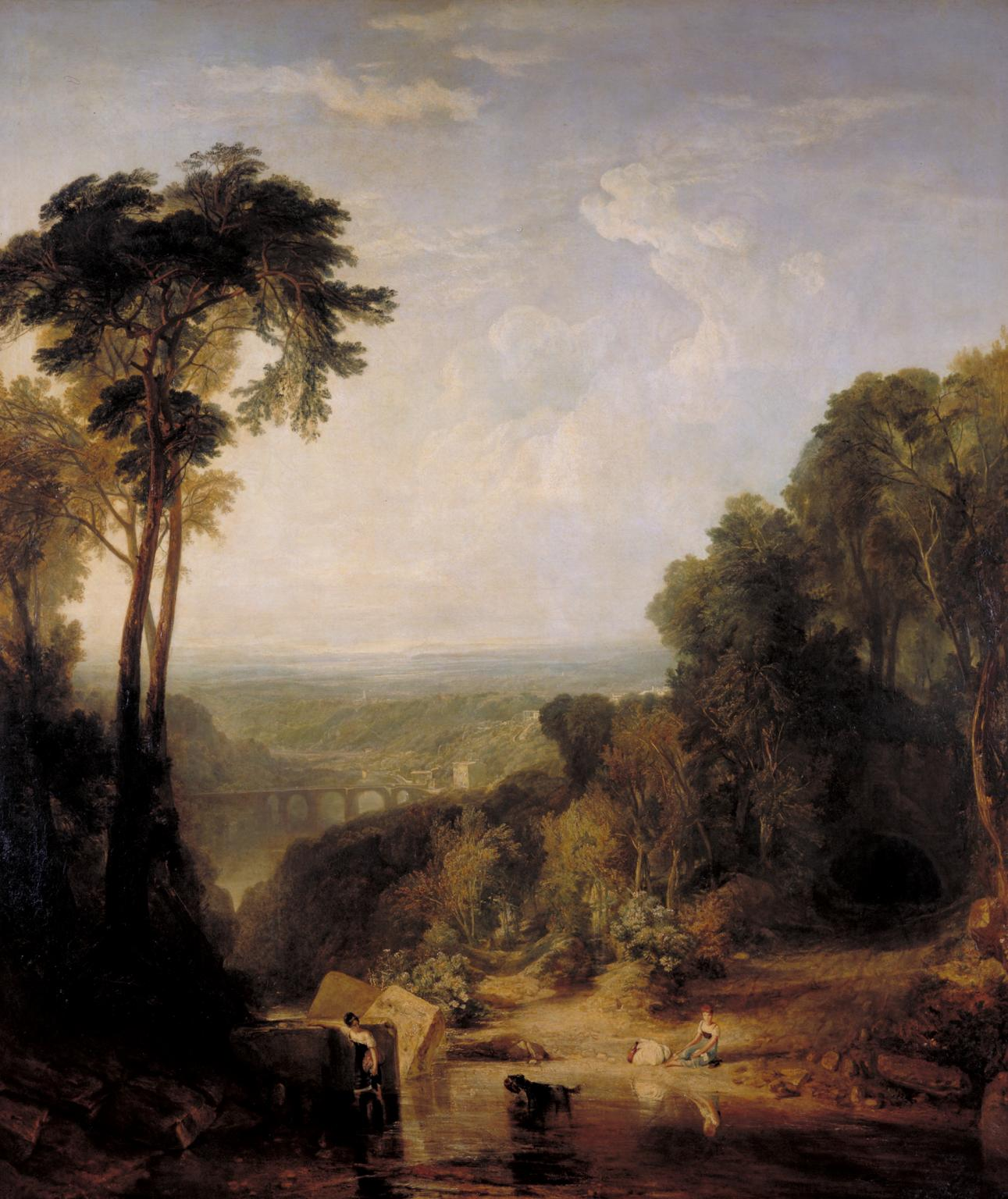
The yellow skies typical of summer 1815 had an impact on the paintings of J. M. W. Turner.

The eruption column reached the stratosphere at an altitude of more than 43 km (43,000 m). The coarser ash particles settled out one to two weeks after the eruptions, but the finer ash particles stayed in the atmosphere from a few months to a few years at altitudes of 10–30 km (33,000–98,000 ft). Longitudinal winds spread these fine particles around the globe, creating optical phenomena. Prolonged and brilliantly colored sunsets and twilights were seen frequently in London between 28 June and 2 July 1815, and 3 September and 7 October 1815. The glow of the twilight sky typically appeared orange or red near the horizon and purple or pink above.

The estimated number of deaths varies depending on the source. Zollinger (1855) puts the number of direct deaths at 10,000, probably caused by pyroclastic flows. On Sumbawa, 18,000 starved to death or died of disease. About 10,000 people on Lombok died from disease and hunger. Petroeschevsky (1949) estimated that about 48,000 people were killed on Sumbawa and 44,000 on Lombok. Stothers in 1984 and several other authors have accepted Petroeschevsky's claim of 88,000 deaths in total. However, a 1998 journal article authored by J. Tanguy and others claimed that Petroeschevsky's figures were unfounded and based on untraceable references. Tanguy's revision of the death toll was based on Zollinger's work on Sumbawa for several months after the eruption and on Thomas Raffles's notes. Tanguy pointed out that there may have been additional victims on Bali and East Java because of famine and disease. Their estimate was 11,000 deaths from direct volcanic effects and 49,000 by post-eruption famine and epidemic diseases. According to Clive Oppenheimer, there were at least 71,000 deaths in total. Reid has estimated that 100,000 people on Sumbawa, Bali and other locations died from the direct and indirect effects of the eruption.

== Disruption of global temperatures ==
The eruption caused a volcanic winter. During the Northern Hemisphere summer of 1816, global temperatures cooled by 0.53 °C (0.95 °F). This cooling directly or indirectly caused 90,000 deaths. The eruption of Mount Tambora was the largest cause of this climate anomaly. While there were other eruptions in 1815, Tambora is classified as a VEI-7 eruption with a column 45 km (148,000 ft) tall, eclipsing all others by at least one order of magnitude.

The VEI is used to quantify the amount of ejected material, with a VEI-7 being 100 km^{3} (24 cu mi). Every index value below that is one order of magnitude (meaning ten times) less. Furthermore, the 1815 eruption occurred during a Dalton Minimum, a period of unusually low solar radiation. Volcanism plays a large role in climate shifts, both locally and globally. This was not always understood and did not enter scientific circles as fact until the 1883 eruption of Krakatoa tinted the skies orange.

The scale of the volcanic eruption will determine the significance of the impact on climate and other chemical processes, but a change will be measured even in the most local of environments. When volcanoes erupt, they eject carbon dioxide (CO_{2}), water, hydrogen, sulfur dioxide (SO_{2}), hydrogen chloride, hydrogen fluoride and many other gases (Meronen et al. 2012). CO_{2} and water are greenhouse gases, which comprise 0.0415 percent and 0.4 percent of the atmosphere, respectively. Their small proportion disguises their significant role in trapping solar radiation and reradiating it back to Earth.

=== Global effects ===
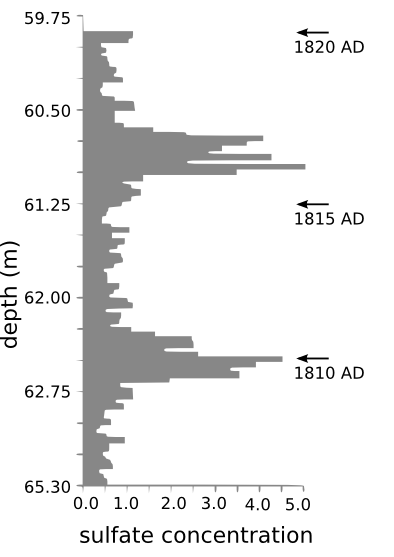
Sulfate concentration in ice core from Central Greenland, dated by counting oxygen isotope seasonal variations: An unknown eruption occurred around the 1810s.

The 1815 eruption released SO_{2} into the stratosphere, causing a global climate anomaly. Different methods have estimated the ejected sulfur mass during the eruption: the petrological method; an optical depth measurement based on anatomical observations; and the polar ice core sulfate concentration method, using cores from Greenland and Antarctica. The figures vary depending on the method, ranging from 10 to 120 million tonnes.

In the northern spring and summer of 1815, a persistent "dry fog" was observed in the northeastern United States. The fog reddened and dimmed the sunlight, such that sunspots were visible to the naked eye. Neither wind nor rainfall dispersed the "fog". It was later identified as a stratospheric sulfate aerosol veil. In the summer of 1816, countries in the Northern Hemisphere suffered extreme weather conditions, dubbed the "Year Without a Summer". Average global temperatures decreased by about 0.4 to 0.7 °C (0.7 to 1.3 °F), enough to cause significant agricultural problems around the globe. On 4 June 1816, frosts were reported in the upper elevations of New Hampshire, Maine (then part of Massachusetts), Vermont and northern New York. On 6 June 1816, snow fell in Albany, New York, and Dennysville, Maine. On 8 June 1816, the snow cover in Cabot, Vermont, was reported still to be 46 cm (18 in) deep. Such conditions occurred for at least three months and ruined most agricultural crops in North America. Canada experienced extreme cold during that summer. Snow 30 cm (12 in) deep accumulated near Quebec City from 6 to 10 June 1816.

The second-coldest year in the Northern Hemisphere since around 1400 was 1816, and the 1810s are the coldest decade on record. That was the consequence of Tambora's 1815 eruption and possibly another VEI-6 eruption in late 1808. The surface temperature anomalies during the summer of 1816, 1817 and 1818 were −0.51 °C (−0.92 °F), −0.44 °C (−0.79 °F) and −0.29 °C (−0.52 °F), respectively. Parts of Europe also experienced a stormier winter.

This climate anomaly has been blamed for the severity of typhus epidemics in southeast Europe and along the eastern Mediterranean Sea between 1816 and 1819. The climate changes disrupted the Indian monsoons, caused three failed harvests and famine, and contributed to the spread of a new strain of cholera that originated in Bengal in 1816. Many livestock died in New England during the winter of 1816–1817. Cool temperatures and heavy rains resulted in failed harvests in the British Isles. Families in Wales travelled long distances as refugees, begging for food. Famine was prevalent in north and southwest Ireland, following the failure of wheat, oat and potato harvests. The crisis was severe in Germany, where food prices rose sharply, and demonstrations in front of grain markets and bakeries, followed by riots, arson and looting, took place in many European cities. It was the worst famine of the 19th century.

== Effects of volcanism ==
Volcanism affects the atmosphere in two distinct ways: short-term cooling caused by reflected insolation and long-term warming from increased CO_{2} levels. Most of the water vapor and CO_{2} is collected in clouds within a few weeks to months because both are already present in large quantities, so the effects are limited. It has been suggested that a volcanic eruption in 1809 may also have contributed to a reduction in global temperatures.

== Impact of the eruption ==
By most calculations, the eruption of Tambora was at least a full order of magnitude (10 times) larger than that of Mount Pinatubo in 1991. Its energy release was equivalent to about 33 gigatons of TNT (1.4×10^{20} J). An estimated 1,220 m (4,000 ft) of the top of the mountain collapsed to form a caldera, reducing the height of the summit by a third. Around 100 km^{3} (24 cu mi) of rock was blasted into the air. Toxic gases, including sulfur, were pumped into the atmosphere. Volcanic ash was over 100 cm (40 in) deep within 75 km (45 mi) of the eruption, while areas within a 500 km (300 mi) radius saw a 5 cm (2 in) ash fall, and ash could be found as far away as 1,300 km (810 mi). The ash burned and smothered crops, creating an immediate shortage of food in Indonesia. The ejection of these gases, especially hydrogen chloride, caused the precipitation to be extremely acidic, killing much of the crops that survived or were rebudding during the spring. The food shortages were compounded by the Napoleonic Wars, floods and cholera.

The ash in the atmosphere for several months after the eruption reflected significant amounts of solar radiation, causing unseasonably cool summers that contributed to food shortages. China, Europe and North America had well-documented below-normal temperatures, which devastated their harvests. The monsoon season in China and India was altered, causing flooding in the Yangtze Valley and forcing thousands of Chinese to flee coastal areas. The gases also reflected some of the already-decreased incoming solar radiation, causing a 0.4 to 0.7 °C (0.7 to 1.3 °F) decrease in global temperatures throughout the decade. An ice dam formed in Switzerland during the summers of 1816 and 1817. The winter months of 1816 were not much different from previous years, but the spring and summer maintained the cool-to-freezing temperatures. The winter of 1817, however, was radically different, with temperatures below −34 °C (−30 °F) in central and northern New York, which were cold enough to freeze lakes and rivers that were normally used to transport supplies. Both Europe and North America suffered from freezes lasting well into June, with snow accumulating to 32 cm (13 in) in August, which killed recently planted crops and crippled the food industry. The length of the growing seasons in parts of Massachusetts and New Hampshire were less than 80 days in 1816, resulting in harvest failures. Visually unique sunsets were observed in western Europe, and red fog was observed along the eastern coast of the U.S. These unique atmospheric conditions persisted for the better part of 2.5 years.

Scientists have used ice cores to monitor atmospheric gases during the cold decade (1810–1819), and the results have been puzzling. The sulfate concentrations found in both Siple Station, Antarctica and central Greenland bounced from 5.0 in January 1816 to 1.1 in August 1818. This means that 25–30 megatons of sulfur were ejected into the atmosphere, most of which came from Tambora, followed by a rapid decrease through natural processes. Tambora caused the largest shift in sulfur concentrations in ice cores for the past 5,000 years. Estimates of the sulfur yield vary from 10 megatons (Black et al. 2012) to 120 megatons (Stothers 2000), with the average of the estimates being 25–30 megatons. The high concentrations of sulfur could have caused a four-year stratospheric warming of around 15 °C (27 °F), resulting in a delayed cooling of surface temperatures that lasted for nine years.

Climate data have shown that the variance between daily lows and highs may have played a role in the lower average temperature because the fluctuations were much more subdued. Generally, the mornings were warmer because of nightly cloud cover and the evenings were cooler because the clouds had dissipated. There were documented fluctuations of cloud cover for various locations that suggested it was a nightly occurrence and the sun killed them off, much like a fog. The class boundaries between 1810 and 1830 without volcanically perturbed years was around 7.9 °C (14.2 °F). In contrast, the volcanically perturbed years (1815–1817) had a change of only around 2.3 °C (4.1 °F). This meant that the mean annual cycle in 1816 was more linear than bell shaped and 1817 endured cooling across the board. Southeastern England, northern France and the Netherlands experienced the greatest amount of cooling in Europe, accompanied by New York, New Hampshire, Delaware and Rhode Island in North America. The documented rainfall was as much as 80 percent more than the calculated normal with regards to 1816, with unusually high amounts of snow in Switzerland, France, Germany and Poland. This is again contrasted by the unusually low precipitations in 1818, which caused droughts throughout most of Europe and Asia. Russia had already experienced unseasonably warm and dry summers since 1815 and this continued for the next three years. There are also documented reductions in ocean temperature near the Baltic Sea, the North Sea and the Mediterranean Sea. This seems to have been an indicator of shifted oceanic circulation patterns and possibly changed wind direction and speed.(Meronen et al. 2012)

Taking into account the Dalton Minimum and the presence of famine and droughts predating the eruption, the Tambora eruption accelerated or exacerbated the extreme climate conditions of 1815. While other eruptions and other climatological events would have led to a global cooling of about 0.2 °C (0.4 °F), Tambora increased on that benchmark substantially.

== Impact of the eruption on popular culture ==
In the summer of 1816, Percy Shelley, Mary Shelley, John Polidori and George Lord Byron, spent the summer at Lake Geneva, Switzerland. Due to the extremely poor weather, they spent most of the summer indoors. Byron challenged his friends to each write a ghost story, and Mary Shelley invented the story that became the novel Frankenstein.

== Comparison of selected volcanic eruptions ==
Comparison of selected volcanic eruptions within the last 2,000 years
Eruptions	Country	Location	Year	Column height (km)	Volcanic Explosivity Index	N. Hemisphere summer anomaly (°C)	Fatalities
Eruption of Mount Vesuvius in 79 AD	Italy	Mediterranean Sea	79	30	5	Unlikely	>2,000
Hatepe (Taupo)	New Zealand	Ring of Fire	232	51	7	?	0
946 eruption of Paektu Mountain	China / North Korea	Central East Asia	946	36	6	?	?
1257 Samalas eruption	Indonesia	Ring of Fire	1257	40	7	−2.0	?
1600 eruption of Huaynaputina	Peru	Ring of Fire	1600	46	6	−0.8	≈1,400
1815 eruption of Mount Tambora	Indonesia / Dutch East-Indies	Ring of Fire	1815	43	7	−0.5	>71,000–121,000
1883 eruption of Krakatoa	Indonesia / Dutch East-Indies	Ring of Fire	1883	27	6	−0.3	36,600
1902 eruption of Santa María	Guatemala	Ring of Fire	1902	34	6	no anomaly	7,000–13,000
1912 eruption of Novarupta	United States, Alaska	Ring of Fire	1912	32	6	−0.4	2
1980 eruption of Mount St. Helens	United States, Washington	Ring of Fire	1980	19	5	no anomaly	57
1982 eruption of El Chichón	Mexico	Ring of Fire	1982	32	4–5	?	>2,000
1985 eruption of Nevado del Ruiz	Colombia	Ring of Fire	1985	27	3	no anomaly	23,000
1991 eruption of Mount Pinatubo	Philippines	Ring of Fire	1991	34	6	−0.5	847
2022 Hunga Tonga–Hunga Haʻapai eruption and tsunami	Tonga	Ring of Fire	2022	55	5–6	+0.035	5
Sources: Oppenheimer (2003), and Smithsonian Global Volcanism Program for VEI

== See also ==
- Dalton Minimum
- List of large Holocene volcanic eruptions
- List of volcanic eruptions by death toll
- List of volcanoes in Indonesia
- Volcanic winter of 536
- Volcanism of Indonesia
- Year Without a Summer
