= 1808 mystery eruption =

Volcanic eruption in southwest Pacific

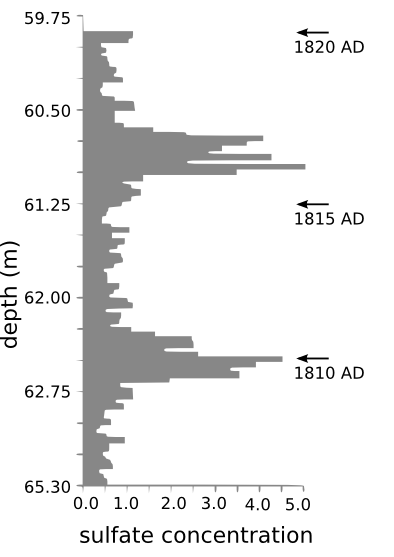
Sulfate concentration in ice cores from Greenland, dated by counting oxygen isotope seasonal variations: A large unknown eruption occurred somewhat before the year 1810. The peak after 1815 was caused by the Mount Tambora eruption.

The 1808 mystery eruption is one or potentially multiple unidentified volcanic eruptions that resulted in a significant rise in stratospheric sulfur aerosols, leading to a period of global cooling analogous to the Year Without a Summer in 1816.

== Background ==
Until the 1990s, climatologists considered the known deterioration of the weather in the early 1810s as a normal phenomenon of the Little Ice Age. A 1991 study of Antarctic and Greenland ice cores, however, found a sulfate spike in early 1809, roughly half that of the 1815 eruption of Mount Tambora. This faced volcanologists with the problem that this period has no recorded eruptions of the needed magnitude to generate such a spike. Further research and bristlecone pine tree ring data pointed to the eruption being in 1808 rather than early 1809.

Initially believed to be a single VEI-6 eruption, emerging evidence suggests that the rise in sulfate concentration and global cooling was likely caused by a series of eruptions, including some minor ones.

== Location and date ==
Due to reports in Bogotá and Lima, the volcano is conjectured to be between Indonesia and Tonga.

Compilations of the geochemistry of tephras found at the corresponding sulfate layer in ice cores indicate multiple eruptions around this time, including a probable Antarctic source, an Alaskan source and an Indonesian source. This led to the possibility that the massive 1809 sulfate spike was generated by a combination of tropical and extra-tropical eruptions occurring in short succession rather than a single large volcanic eruption.

The analysis of sulfur isotopes shows a complex time-evolving pattern, suggesting multiple eruptions that caused the 1809 sulfate layer and global cooling, consistent with the presence of different geochemical tephra populations during this period.

The expectation that any eruptions of that magnitude should have been noticed at the time added to the mystery. Records from the time throughout the world were checked but nothing appeared viable until the summer of 2014, when PhD student Alvaro Guevara-Murua and Caroline Williams of the University of Bristol discovered an account of atmospheric events consistent with such an event by Colombian scientist Francisco José de Caldas.

Caldas served as Director of the Astronomical Observatory of Bogotá between 1805 and 1810 and in 1809 reported a "transparent cloud that obstructs the sun's brilliance" at Bogotá. It had first been observed by him on 11 December 1808 and was visible across Colombia. The cloud might have been a "dry fog", which is a sulfuric acid (H_{2}SO_{4}) aerosol. He also reported that the weather had been unusually cold, with frosts.

To the south, in Peru, physician Hipólito Unanue made similar observations in Lima. These reports led those involved to suggest that the window of the eruption was within seven days of 4 December 1808. Caldas' and Unanue's accounts indicated the existence of a stratospheric aerosol veil spanning at least 2,600 kilometres (1,600 mi) into both northern and southern hemispheres. The only likely source for this would be a tropical volcano, most likely located in the southern hemisphere but not likely further than 20 degrees south latitude.

The south-western Pacific Ocean between Indonesia and Tonga is an area in the tropics to the west of Colombia and Peru with candidate volcanoes and with little reporting at that time. This area had no European settlements at the time, and most of the reporting on its volcanic activity goes back only to the mid-19th century, apart from the occasional sighting by passing European explorers. The region includes the Rabaul area, which has had VEI 6 eruptions, as well as the Hunga Tonga–Hunga Haʻapai area which had a VEI 5–6 eruption in 2022. The oral histories of the indigenous populations of these areas report eruptions, but these could not be dated with any degree of certainty.

== Known significant eruptions in 1808 ==
In 1808, there were major eruptions in Urzelina, Azores, on 1–4 May, and in Taal Volcano, Philippines, in March. Neither of these occurred within the correct period for the visual observations.

The Chilean Putana volcano also had a major eruption around this time, with an approximate date of 1810 (with a 10-year margin of error), but it is located 22 degrees south and therefore slightly outside the preferred latitude range.

== See also ==
- 1257 Samalas eruption, previously a mystery eruption
- 1458 mystery eruption
- 1452/1453 mystery eruption
- List of large volcanic eruptions of the 19th century
