= Mercato eruption =

Eruption of Mount Vesuvius (~8900 BP)

- Volcano: Mount Vesuvius
- Date: 6940 BCE ± 100 years
- Type: Plinian eruption
- Location: Campania, Italy
- VEI: 5 or 6

The Mercato eruption (Pomici di Mercato) of Mount Vesuvius was a Plinian eruption that occurred around 8,010 ± 40 14C yr BP (8,890 ± 90 cal yr BP). The Global Volcanism Program claims that the eruption had a Volcanic Explosivity Index (VEI) of 5, while Zanella et al. (2014) estimate it had a VEI of 6. The eruption was preceded by 7,000 years of rest and followed by about 4,000 years of rest.

== See also ==
- List of large volcanic eruptions
