= Pago (Papua New Guinea) =

Volcano in Papua New Guinea

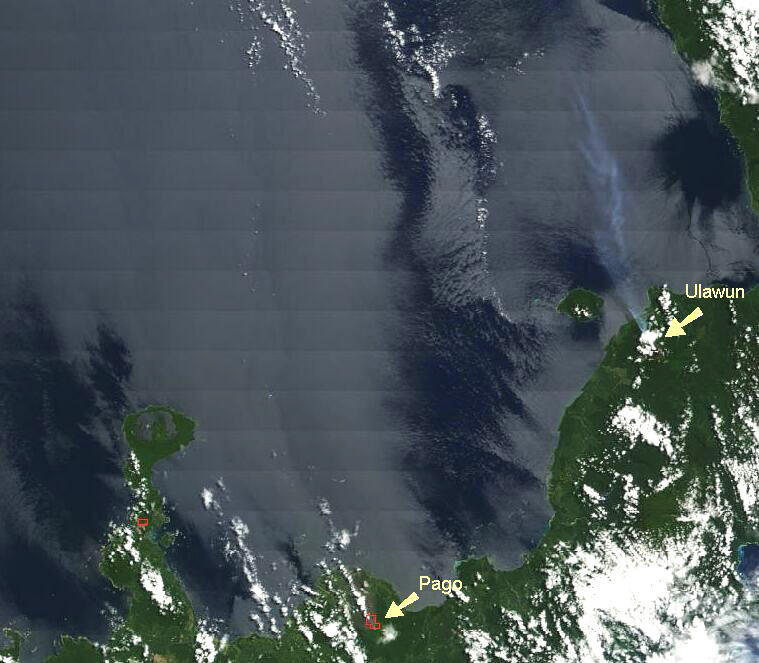
- Pago on the left

Highest point
- Elevation: 742 m (2,434 ft)
- Coordinates: 5°35′0″S 150°31′0″E

Geography
- Location within Papua New Guinea
- Location: New Britain, Papua New Guinea

Geology
- Rock age: 350 years ago
- Volcanic arc: Bismarck volcanic arc
- Last eruption: May to July 2012

The volcano Pago is located East of Kimbe, West New Britain Province, Papua New Guinea. Pago is a young post-caldera cone within the Witori Caldera. The Buru Caldera cuts the SW flank of the Witori volcano. Biggest eruptions were at 4000±200 BC, VEI 6, 10 cubic kilometres (2.5 mi.^{3}); 1370±100 BC, VEI6, 30 km^{3} (7 mi.^{3}); and 710±75 AD, VEI 6, 20 km^{3} (5 mi.^{3}) of tephra.

Pago erupted 8 times in the 500 years to 2002, including a major eruption in 1933. In 2002 the threat of a major eruption of Pago caused the evacuation of 15,000 people. Five volcanic explosive ash-plume advisories were issued related to Pago in the months May–July 2012.
