= Lake Ilopango =

Crater lake in El Salvador which fills a caldera

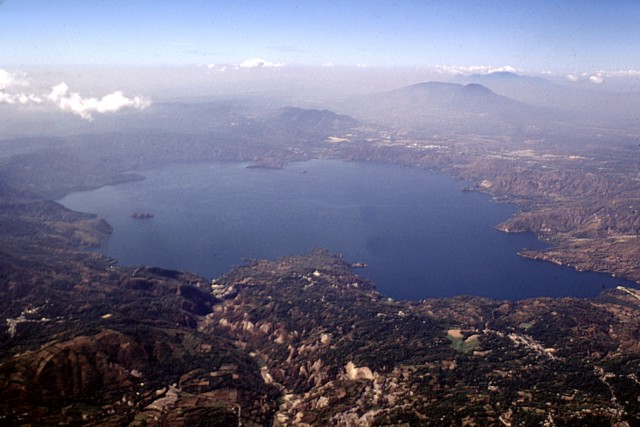
- Westward view from lake Ilopango, aft San Salvador Metropolitan Area and San Salvador (volcano) lie just ahead

Highest point
- Elevation: 450 m (1,480 ft)
- Coordinates: 13.67°N 89.05°W

Geography
- Location within El Salvador
- Location: El Salvador

Geology
- Mountain type: Caldera
- Volcanic arc: Central America Volcanic Arc
- Last eruption: 1879 to 1880

Lake Ilopango
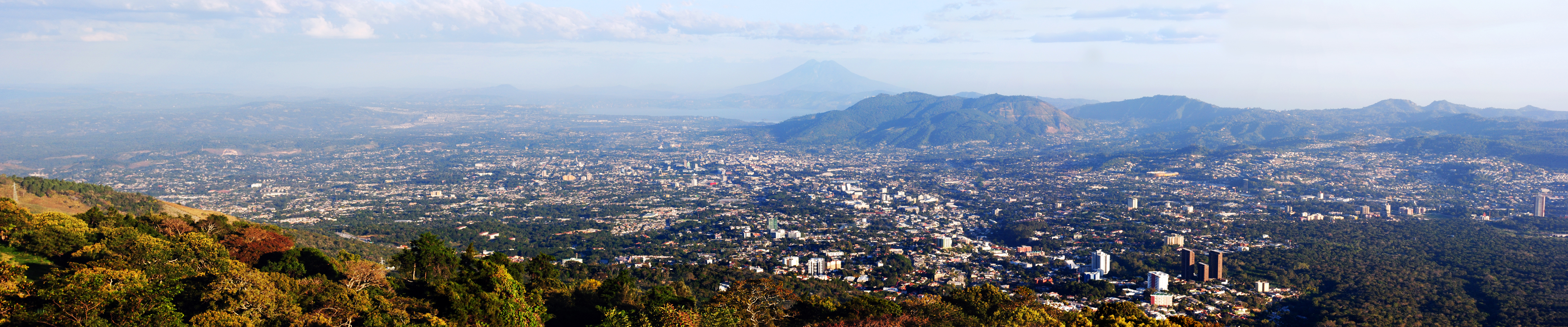
- Eastward view from San Salvador (volcano), San Salvador Metropolitan Area at the center and aft, the ilopango caldera lies just behind along with San Vicente (volcano)

- Location within El Salvador
- Interactive map of Lake Ilopango
- Location: Central El Salvador
- Coordinates: 13.67°N 89.05°W
- Type: crater lake
- Basin countries: El Salvador
- Max. length: 11 km (6.8 mi)
- Max. width: 8 km (5.0 mi)
- Surface area: 70.5 km^{2} (27.2 sq mi)
- Average depth: ~ 170 m (560 ft)
- Max. depth: 231 m (758 ft)
- Water volume: ~ 12 km^{3} (2.9 cu mi)
- Surface elevation: 440 m (1,440 ft)
- Islands: Islas Quemadas

Lake Ilopango is a crater lake which fills an 8 by 11 km: 70.5 km^{2} (27.2 sq mi) volcanic caldera in central El Salvador, on the borders of the San Salvador, La Paz, and Cuscatlán departments. The caldera, which contains the second largest lake in the country and is immediately east of the capital city, San Salvador, has a scalloped 100 m (330 ft) to 500 m (1,600 ft) high rim. Any surplus drains via the Jiboa River to the Pacific Ocean. The local military airbase, Ilopango International Airport, has annual airshows where international pilots from all over the world fly over San Salvador City and Ilopango lake.

== Eruptive history ==
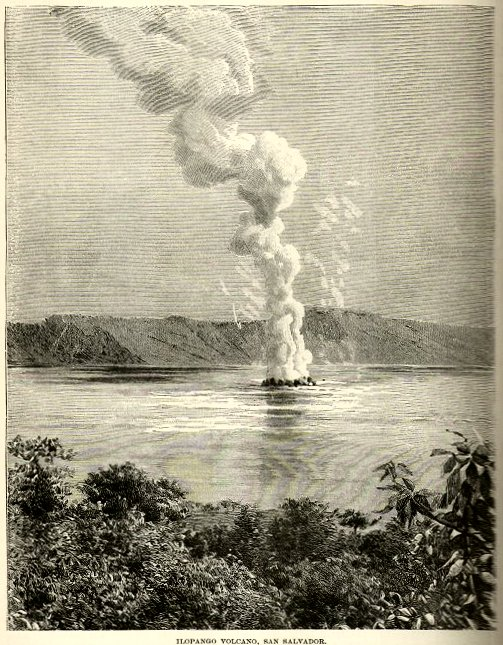
Engraving of the eruption of the Ilopango volcano, 1891

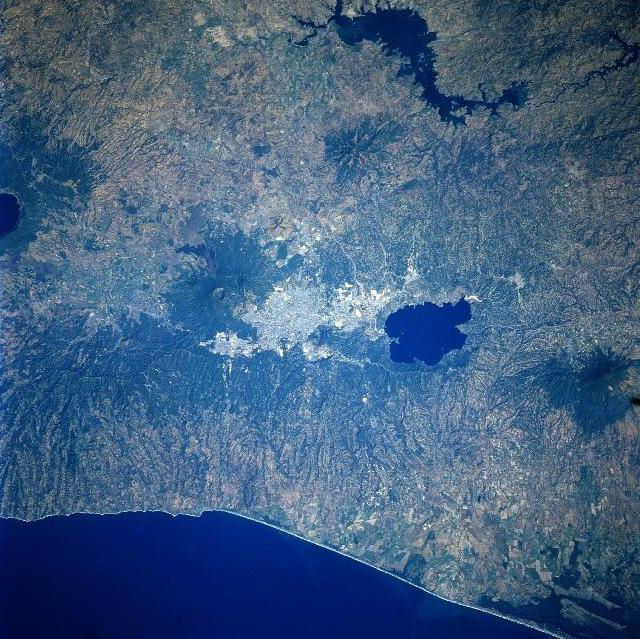
The San Salvador Metropolitan Area is pinned between the volcano San Salvador and Lake Ilopango Caldera. The Pacific Coast is adjacent south of the city

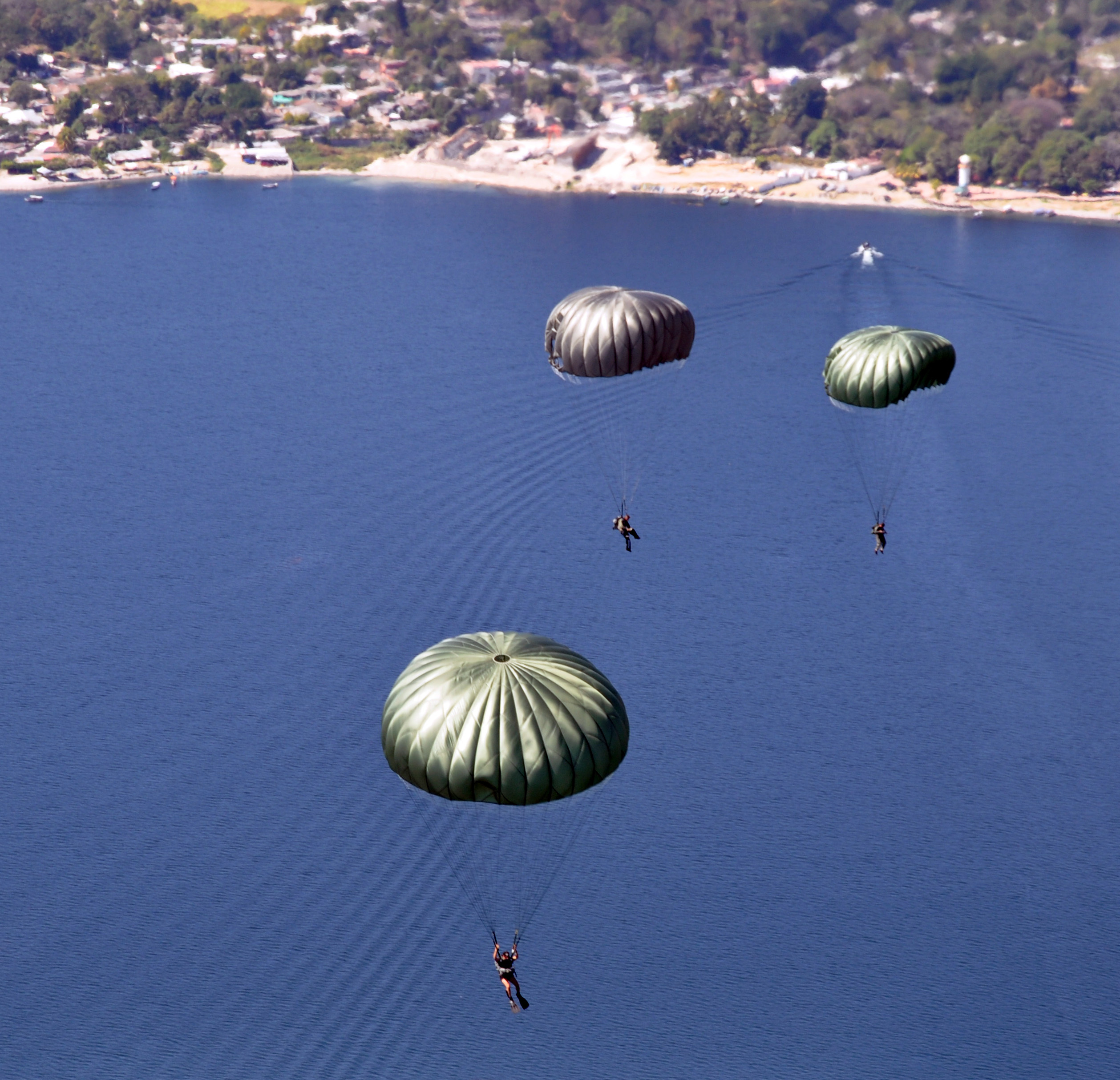
U.S. soldiers with the 7th Special Forces Group and Salvadoran service members maneuver after jumping from the ramp of a U.S. Army CH-47 Chinook helicopter during a joint training exercise over Lake Ilopango, El Salvador, January 21, 2014

Four major dacitic–rhyolitic eruptions occurred during the late Pleistocene and Holocene, producing pyroclastic flows and tephra that blanketed much of the country.

The caldera collapsed most recently sometime between 410 and 535 CE (based on radiocarbon dating of plant life directly related to the eruption), which produced widespread pyroclastic flows and devastated Mayan cities; however, a team of scientists concluded that the volcanic eruption might have happened in 431±2 CE, based on volcanic shards taken from ice cores in Greenland, levels of sulphur recorded in ice cores from Antarctica, and radiocarbon dating of a charred tree found in volcanic ash deposits. The eruption is estimated to have produced around 37–82 km^{3} (8.9–19.7 cu mi) of ejecta (DRE—several times more than the 1980 eruption of Mount St. Helens), which puts it at a rating of 6 on the Volcanic Explosivity Index (VEI) and makes it one of the biggest volcanic events on Earth in the last 7,000 years. Fallout from the eruption column blanketed an area of at least 10,000 km^{2} (3,900 sq mi) with pumice and ash to a depth of at least 50 cm (20 in), and an area of nearly 2,000,000 km^{2} (770,000 sq mi) to a depth of at least 0.5 cm (0.20 in), which would have stopped all agricultural production in the most-severely affected area for decades. It is also theorized that the eruption and subsequent weather events and agricultural failures directly led to the abandonment of Teotihuacan by the original inhabitants.

It was hypothesized that this eruption caused the extreme weather events of 535–536 in Europe and Asia, but this is unlikely given the research published in 2020 that dates the eruption to 431 CE.

Later eruptions formed several lava domes within the lake and near its shore. The only historical eruption, which occurred from December 31, 1879, up to March 26, 1880, produced a lava dome and had a VEI of 3. The lava dome reached the surface of the lake, forming the islets known as Islas Quemadas.

== Scuba diving ==
Ilopango Lake is also known for its exceptional scuba diving opportunities. One of the standout spots is Cerros Quemados, where divers can explore depths reaching up to 90 to 100 feet (27 to 30 m). This unique location features an underwater 'sand beach'.

== See also ==
- List of volcanoes in El Salvador
- Volcanic winter of 536
- Year Without a Summer
- Tierra Blanca Joven eruption
