= Dense-rock equivalent =

Volcanologic calculation to estimate eruption volume

Dense-rock equivalent (DRE) is a volcanologic calculation used to estimate volcanic eruption volume. One of the widely accepted measures of the size of a historic or prehistoric eruption is the volume of magma ejected as pumice and volcanic ash, known as tephra during an explosive phase of the eruption, or the volume of lava extruded during an effusive phase of a volcanic eruption. Eruption volumes are commonly expressed in cubic kilometers (km^{3}).

Historical and geological estimates of tephra volumes are usually obtained by mapping the distribution and thickness of tephra deposits on the ground after the eruption is over. For historical volcanic explosions, further estimates must be made of tephra deposits that might have changed significantly over time by other geological processes including erosion. Tephra volumes measured in this way must then be corrected for void spaces (vesicles – bubbles within the pumice, empty spaces between individual pieces of pumice or ash) to get an estimate of the original volume of magma erupted. This correction can be made by comparing the bulk density of the tephra deposit with the known density of the original gas-free rock-type that makes up the tephra. The result is referred to as the dense-rock equivalent of the erupted volume.

Dense-rock equivalent calculations can also be used to measure the sizes of volcanic eruptions on other planetary bodies, such as Mars. However, the challenge to making these estimates is accurately estimating the density of the tephra deposit or of the dense rock, measuring the thickness of tephra, determining if the tephra is related to the eruption studied or to a nearby one, and estimating changes resulting from other geological processes that may be less understood than on Earth.

Significant studies of the dense-rock equivalent erupted volumes of the Bronze-Age Minoan eruption in Santorini have provided data to archeologists to better understand the effect of the eruption on development of several civilizations including Ancient Greek and Ancient Egyptian cultures. Through careful analysis of pumice and ash deposits (including deep sea core samples), researchers have been able to make dense-rock equivalent volume estimates for each of the major eruptions of Thera.

== See also ==
- Volcanic Explosivity Index – (VEI) Predictive qualitative scale for explosiveness of volcanic eruptions
