= Lamen =

Lamen may refer to:

- Lamen (island), an island in Vanuatu
  - Lamen language, a Vanuatuan language spoken on Lamen
- Lamen (magic), a magical pendant worn as a breastplate
- Fadel Mohamed Lamen (born 1960), Libyan political scientist and journalist
- Ramen, also romanized as lamen, a Japanese noodle soup
