= Fadel Mohamed Lamen =

- Born: 1960 (age 65–66); Benghazi, Libya
- Occupations: Political analyst, journalist
- Known for: National Dialogue Commission, Libyan Political Agreement

Fadel Mohamed Lamen (born 1960) is a distinguished Libyan political figure, political analyst, journalist, and advisor on Middle East and North African affairs. He has played a key role in Libya's political transition since the 2011 revolution, notably as a leading figure in national dialogue and post-conflict development initiatives.

== Early life and background ==
Fadel Mohamed Lamen was born in Benghazi, Libya, and raised in Tripoli. He comes from a prominent family on both sides: his father's lineage is rooted in the Al-Ameen house within the Zawaid tribe, known for leadership and religious scholarship. His maternal grandfather was Al Fadeel Abu Omar, a prominent commander in the Libyan resistance against Italian colonization and companion of Omar al-Mukhtar. His background reflects deep ties to both western and eastern Libyan traditions.

== Education ==
Fadel Mohamed Lamen attended Ahmed Ghanaba Elementary School in the old city of Tripoli. He completed his middle school at the acclaimed Ali Haydar Saati School, and earned his high school diploma from the distinguished Ali Waraith High School in Tripoli.

He later earned a Bachelor of Science in Civil Engineering, and a Master's degree in Journalism and Mass Communications from the United States. He also pursued studies in political science, international relations, and foreign policy.

== Career ==
Fadel Mohamed Lamen served as Director-General of the Libyan National Economic and Social Development Board, focusing on rebuilding Libya’s post-revolution institutions and promoting youth and women’s empowerment in political and economic life.

He was a key contributor to the Libyan Political Agreement and led the National Dialogue Preparatory Commission, the only nationally supported political initiative recognized by the United Nations during Libya’s transitional period.

Fadel Mohamed Lamen has advised and collaborated with several international organizations and think tanks, including the Carnegie Endowment for International Peace, the Atlantic Council, and Chatham House.

== Media and publications ==
Fadel Mohamed Lamen has published political commentary in both English and Arabic through outlets such as Business Insider, Minbar Libya, and Formiche. He has appeared as a commentator on international channels such as PBS, C-SPAN, and in interviews discussing Libya’s transition and U.S. foreign policy.

== Political candidacy ==
Ahead of the presidential election initially scheduled for December 2021, Fadel Mohamed Lamen formally submitted his candidacy to the Libyan High National Election Commission. His platform emphasized national reconciliation and stability, as reflected in several interviews at the time.

In May 2025, several Libyan and international media outlets mentioned Fadel Mohamed Lamen as a possible candidate for the position of Prime Minister of Libya. According to *Minbar Libya*, he is seen as a consensus figure, with both international recognition and credibility within Libyan political circles. The outlet highlighted his pivotal role in the national dialogue and described his profile as that of a moderate technocrat.

Times of Malta also referenced his name in the context of ongoing international consultations and Libya’s political stabilization efforts.

In addition, Fadel Mohamed Lamen continues to be quoted in English-language media discussing migration and EU-Libya relations, which has further fueled speculation about his possible executive role.

In addition, Fadel Mohamed Lamen continues to be quoted in English-language media discussing migration and EU-Libya relations, which has further fueled speculation about his possible executive role.

== Recognition and influence ==
Having lived over 15 years in Washington, D.C., Fadel Mohamed Lamen is considered one of the most credible Libyan political voices in U.S. and international circles. He is known among Middle East and North Africa (MENA) policy experts for his insights into U.S. foreign policy and the strategic dynamics of the region.
