= List of endangered languages of Oceania =

Language Endangerment Status by UNESCO Atlas of the World's Languages in Danger category

Extinct (EX)
- Extinct (EX): (lists)

Endangered
- Critically Endangered (CR); Severely Endangered (SE); Definitely Endangered (DE); Vulnerable (VU): (list); (list); (list); (list)

Safe
- Safe (NE): no list
- Other categories
- Revived (RE); Constructed (CL): (list); (list)
- Related topics: Atlas of the World's Languages in Danger; Endangered Languages Project; Ethnologue; Unclassified language; List of languages by total number of speakers
- UNESCO Atlas of the World's; Languages in Danger categories

This is a list of endangered languages of Oceania, based on the definitions used by UNESCO.

An endangered language is a language that it is at risk of falling out of use because there is little transmission of the language to younger generations. If a language loses all of its native speakers, it becomes an extinct language.

== Australia ==
According to the 2016 census, English is the only language spoken in the home for close to 72.7% of the population. The next most common languages spoken at home are Mandarin (2.5%), Arabic (1.4%), Cantonese (1.2%), Vietnamese (1.2%) and Italian (1.2%). A considerable proportion of first- and second-generation migrants are bilingual.

== Federated States of Micronesia ==
Language	Speakers	Status	Comments	Ref
Kapingamarangi language	~3,000	Severely endangered		
Kosraean language	~7,720	Severely endangered	Micronesia & Nauru	
Mokilese language	~1,500	Critically endangered		
Mortlockese language, Mortlockese	~5,900	Definitely endangered		
Namonuito language, Namonuito		Severely endangered		
Ngatikese Men's Creole language, Ngatikese Men's Creole		Definitely endangered		
Nukuoro language, Nukuoro	~1,540	Definitely endangered		
Nguluwan language				
Paafang language, Paafang, Pááfang	~1,300	Severely endangered		
Pingelapese language, Pingelapese	~4,500	Severely endangered		
Puluwat language, Puluwat, Puluwatese	~1,500	Severely endangered		
Satawal language, Satawal		Severely endangered		
Ulithian language, Ulithian		Severely endangered		
Woleaian language, Woleaian		Severely endangered		

== Indonesia ==
The UNESCO Atlas of the World's Languages in Danger lists 88 endangered languages in Indonesia.

== Melanesia ==
=== New Caledonia ===
The following languages of New Caledonia may be considered endangered.

Language	Speakers	Status	Comments	Ref
Arha language	35	Critically endangered	Arhâ language	(1996 census)
Arho language	10	Critically endangered		
Caac language	~1,200	Vulnerable		
Drubea language		Vulnerable		
Fagauvea language (Northern)		Vulnerable		
Fagauvea language (Southern)		Vulnerable		
Fwâi language		Vulnerable		
Jawe language		Vulnerable		
Kumak language		Vulnerable		
Neku language		Severely endangered		
Nemi language		Definitely endangered		
Orowe language		Definitely endangered		
Pije language		Severely endangered		
Pwaamèi language		Definitely endangered		
Pwapwa language		Severely endangered		
Tiri language		Definitely endangered		
Voh-Koné dialects		Definitely endangered		
Xaragure language		Vulnerable		

=== Solomon Islands ===
Language	Speakers	Status	Comments	Ref
Asumboa language		Severely endangered		
Blablanga language		Definitely endangered		
Faghani language		Vulnerable		
Gao language		Vulnerable		
Hoava language		Vulnerable		
Kokota language		Vulnerable		
Lovono language	4	Critically endangered		
Oroha language		Severely endangered		
Ririo language		Critically endangered		
Savo language		Definitely endangered		
Tanema language	1	Critically endangered		
Tanimbili language		Severely endangered		
Teanu language	1000	Definitely endangered		
Zazao language		Critically endangered		

=== Vanuatu ===
Language	Speakers	Status	Comments	Ref
Amblong language		Definitely endangered		
Araki language		Critically endangered		
Aveteian language		Critically endangered		
Baki language		Vulnerable		
Bangsa language		Critically endangered		
Bierebo language		Vulnerable		
Bieria language		Critically endangered		
Dorig language		Definitely endangered		
Emae language		Vulnerable		
Hiw language	280	Definitely endangered		(2010 A.François)
Koro language	250	Definitely endangered		
Labo language		Vulnerable		
Lakon language	800	Vulnerable		
Lehali language	200	Vulnerable		
Lemerig language	2	Critically endangered		
Lorediakarkar language		Critically endangered		
Löyöp language	240	Vulnerable	Lehalurup	(2010 A.François)
Mafea language		Definitely endangered		
Malmariv language		Vulnerable		
Matanvat language		Critically endangered		
Mores language		Severely endangered		
Mwesen language		Critically endangered		
Naati language (Näti)		Critically endangered		
Naman language		Critically endangered		
Nasarian language	5	Critically endangered		(Nasarian at Ethnologue (18th ed., 2015))
Navwien language		Critically endangered		
Nisvai language		Critically endangered		
Nivat language		Critically endangered		
Niviar language		Critically endangered		
Olrat language	0	Critically endangered	3 speakers in 2003; extinct in 2009.	
Polonomombauk language		Definitely endangered		
Repanbitip language		Definitely endangered		
Shark Bay language		Vulnerable		
Ske language		Severely endangered		
Sorsorian language (Sösörian)		Critically endangered		
Tambotalo language	50	Severely endangered		(1983 SIL)
Tape language		Critically endangered		
Tolomako language		Definitely endangered		
Tutuba language		Definitely endangered		
Umbrul language (Numbuwul)		Critically endangered		
Ura language	6	Critically endangered		(1998 T Crowley)
Vera'a language		Definitely endangered		
Volow language		Critically endangered		

== Palau ==
Language	Speakers	Status	Comments	Ref
Tobian language	22	Critically endangered		(1995 SIL)
Sonsorolese language	600	Severely endangered		

== Polynesia ==
The following Polynesian languages considered endangered are mostly Polynesian outliers spoken by tiny minorities.

Language	Speakers	Status	Ethnologue entry (ISO 639-3)
Rapa language (French Polynesia)		Severely endangered	
Rapa Nui language (Chile)		Severely endangered	
Niuafo'ou language (Tonga)			
Nukumanu language (Papua New Guinea, Nukumanu Islands)			
Nukuria language (Papua New Guinea)			
Ontong Java language (Solomon Islands)			
Sikaiana language (Solomon Islands)			
Takuu language (Papua New Guinea)			
Tuvaluan language (Tuvalu)		Definitely endangered	
Anuta language (Solomon Islands)			
Futunan language (Wallis and Futuna)			
Futuna-Aniwa language (Vanuatu)			
Mele-Fila language (Vanuatu)			
Rennell-Bellona language (Solomon Islands)			
Tikopia language (Solomon Islands)			
Vaeakau-Taumako language (Solomon Islands)			
Pukapuka language (Cook Islands)		Definitely endangered	
Penrhyn language (Cook Islands)		Severely endangered	
Tokelauan language (Tokelau)		Severely endangered	

== Other ==
Language	Location	Speakers	Status	Comments	Ref
Austral language	French Polynesia		Definitely endangered		
Chamorro language	Guam/Northern Mariana Islands		Vulnerable		
Mangareva language	French Polynesia		Severely endangered		
Rakahanga-Manihiki language	Cook Islands		Definitely endangered		
Nauruan language	Nauru		Severely endangered		
Niuean language	Niue		Definitely endangered	Vagahau Niue	
Norfuk language (Norfolk)	Norfolk Island		Definitely endangered		
Norfuk language (Pitcairn)	Pitcairn		Vulnerable		
Penrhyn language	Cook Islands		Severely endangered		
Pukapukan language	Cook Islands		Definitely endangered		
Cook Islands Māori	Cook Islands		Vulnerable	Rarotongan language	
Rotuman language	Fiji		Vulnerable		
Tokelauan language	Tokelau		Severely endangered		
Tuamotuan language	French Polynesia		Definitely endangered		
Tuvaluan language	Tuvalu		Definitely endangered		
Hawaiian language	Hawai'i		Critically endangered		
