= Nokuku language =

Austronesian language spoken in Vanuatu

Nokuku
- Nogugu, Cape Cumberland
- Native to: Vanuatu
- Region: Espiritu Santo
- Native speakers: 250-500
- Language family: Austronesian: Malayo-Polynesian; Oceanic; Southern Oceanic; North-Central Vanuatu; North Vanuatu; Espiritu Santo; Nokuku

Language codes
- ISO 639-3: nkk
- Glottolog: noku1237
- ELP: Nokuku
- Nokuku is not endangered according to the classification system of the UNESCO Atlas of the World's Languages in Danger

- Nokuku is spoken around Nokuku village, on Cape Cumberland of Espiritu Santo Island Nokuku language (Oceania)
- Coordinates: 14.86189°S 166.55313°E

Nokuku (Nogugu) is an Oceanic language spoken along the northwestern shore of Espiritu Santo Island in Vanuatu. It has a few hundred speakers but is poorly documented. Nokuku has significant lexical overlap with its neighboring languages, and some researchers consider it a dialect of the regional language rather than a separate language.

== Classification ==
Nokuku is part of the North-Central Vanuatu branch of the Oceanic subfamily of the Austronesian languages.

Nokuku is closely related to four other nearby languages: Piamatsina, Tasmate, Valpei, and Vunapu. The languages are similar enough that some scholars have grouped them as dialects of a single "Cape Cumberland" language. Specifically, they have a lexical overlap of approximately 70%.

Nokuku is poorly documented, with the best published sources dating to the late 19th and early 20th centuries, and additional field notes collected more recently.

== Geographic distribution ==
Nokuku is spoken on the western coast of Cape Cumberland, the northwestern cape of Espiritu Santo. Its spoken range is from the village of Olpoi to the village of Petawota, with Nokuku being the namesake village near the middle of its range. To the north, Valpei is spoken, and to the south, Tasmate.

== Phonology ==
=== Consonants ===
Nokuku consonants
	Bilabial		Protruded Bilabial		Alveolar		Velar	Glottal
Plosive	p		pʷ		t		k	ʔ
Fricative		v			s			
Nasal		m		mʷ		n		
Trill						r		
Approximant				w		j		
Lateral approximant						l		

=== Vowels ===
Nokuku Monophthongs
	Front	Back
	unrounded	rounded
Close	i	u
Close-mid	e	o
Open	a	ɔ

=== Phonological processes ===
When Nokuku was first documented in the 19th century, word-final consonant-vowel sequences were permitted in some contexts. However, present-day Nokuku deletes final vowels in CV contexts. Consonant-vowel-vowel sequences are permitted.

Nokuku also has a vowel dissimilation process where the first /a/ in a sequence of /a/s raises to [e] or [o]. For instance, /mata-na/ ('his/her eye') is pronounced as [metana].

== Writing system ==
Nokuku has been transcribed using Latin-based orthographies similar to the International Phonetic Alphabet. These transcriptions generally included idiosyncratic letter choices by the transcribers, and there is no codified writing system for the language.
