= Mav̋ea language =

Austronesian language spoken in Vanuatu

Mav̋ea
- Mavea
- Native to: Vanuatu
- Region: Mavea Island
- Native speakers: 34 (2008)
- Language family: Austronesian: Malayo-Polynesian; Oceanic; Southern Oceanic; North-Central Vanuatu; North Vanuatu; Espiritu Santo; Mav̋ea

Language codes
- ISO 639-3: mkv
- Glottolog: mafe1237
- ELP: Mavea
- Mav̋ea is classified as Definitely Endangered by the UNESCO Atlas of the World's Languages in Danger.

Mav̋ea (also rendered Mavʼea, Mafea or Mavia) is an Oceanic language spoken on Mavea Island in Vanuatu, off the eastern coast of Espiritu Santo. It belongs to the North–Central Vanuatu linkage of Southern Oceanic. The total population of the island is approximately 172, with only 34 fluent speakers of the Mavea language reported in 2008.

There are 94 languages in the North Vanuatu linkage, including Mavea. The closest linguistic relative to Mavea, sharing a little over 70% of cognates, is Tutuba. Following Tutuba, Aore, South Malok, Araki, and Tangoa are the next closest relatives.

== Language endangerment ==
Mavea is a moribund language and there are many factors as to why this is.

One factor would be the arrival and Christianization by the Seventh-day Adventist and Church of Christ missionaries in 1839. Only 16% of the population can speak Mavea. These native speakers of Mavea belong to Generation 1, 2, and 3 which ranges from the ages of 20–80 years old. Those born after 1980 ("Generation 4") are less fluent. Commonly, this generation is not taught the language, because the language is inactive and not used in any new domain.

Mavea is not used very commonly outside of the home; in particular, it is not used in school, which reduces the younger speakers' exposure to the language. Most speakers do not feel concerned with the possible loss of the Mavea language.

Bislama, the national lingua franca of Vanuatu, is used more frequently. This creole is the first language for many people in Vanuatu who live in the city. It is used for business, religious sacraments, politics, and is seen as a way to move upward in society.

== Phonology ==
Mavea has 15 consonants and 8 vowels. The extra vowels are recent developments; they are not indicated in the orthography.

Consonants
	Labial	Linguo- labial	Alveolar	Retroflex	Velar
Nasal	m ⟨m⟩	n̼ ⟨m̋⟩	n ⟨n⟩		ŋ ⟨n⟩
Plosive	p ⟨p⟩	t̼ ⟨p̋⟩	t ⟨t⟩	ɖ ⟨d⟩	k ⟨k⟩
Fricative	v ⟨v⟩	ð̼ ⟨v̋⟩	s ⟨s⟩		
Approximant			l ⟨l⟩		w ⟨w⟩
Trill			r ⟨r⟩		

- None of the plosives are aspirated or prenasalized, unlike in the related Tamambo.
- Almost all speakers lack linguolabial phonemes in their idiolects, including a majority of elders.

Vowels
	i	e	a	o	u
High	+				+
Back			+	+	+
Low			+		
Rounded				+	+

=== Orthography ===
Linguolabial consonants are represented using the corresponding labial consonant with a double acute accent on top: p̋ [t̼]; v̋ [ð̼]; m̋ [n̼]. (This is a slight variation compared with the convention, shared by other Vanuatu languages, of transcribing linguolabials using two dots, respectively as p̈; v̈; m̈.)

The retroflex [ɖ] is represented in the orthography as d.

== Grammar ==
=== Pronouns ===
There are both free and bound pronouns. Free pronouns are common in many Pacific languages. These free pronouns do not change for gender, but shows numerical differences, including singular, plural, dual, or paucal.

For example:

- /mo/ = he/she/it (third person singular subject)
- He eats taro. = /mo-an pete/

=== Proper nouns ===
Proper nouns includes personal names, vocatives, relational terms, and locatives. They do not proceed an article and can not be used with a determiner. To show gender distinction, males use the prefix /mol-/. For females, the prefix /vo-/ or /va-/ was added.

=== Common nouns ===
Similar to the proper nouns, there are both bound and free common nouns. Both can be used in an argument, be quantified with a marker, be modified with a determiner, be the head of a relative clause, and be questioned with "who" or "what". Bound common nouns are separated into nouns of kinship, body parts, bodily functions, and whole part relations. Also shows possessives.

=== Verbs ===
Verbal predicates are marked with a subject agreement prefix. There are intransitive verbs, transitive verbs, ambitransitive, ditransitive, and auxiliary.

Intransitive verbs are used when the subject has no direct object receiving the action.

=== Adverbs ===
There are two kinds of adverbs: phrasal adverbs and sentential adverbs. Sentential adverbs take up the entire sentence and appear after or before the verb's core argument. For example: to show frequency, /te pong/ meaning "sometimes" is used as a sentential adverb.

Spatial adverbs are used to show the location of the speaker and the direction the speaker is speaking towards. For example: konaro means "here, at speaker's location." This is common in many Pacific languages.

=== Reduplication ===
Mavea shows partial reduplication in its grammar. Reduplication is used to show emphasis. For example: sua means "to paddle" and suosua means "to paddle intensely". Sometimes when using reduplication, the vowels can change. Usually the "a" changes to "o" or "e".

=== Adjectives ===
Adjectives can only be used as noun modifiers. There both adjectives as independent lexical items and also adjectives pulled from transitive verbs by using reduplication. For example: pulua is "paint" and "ima pulpulu" means "painted house".

=== Prepositions ===
There are seven prepositions in Mavea.

to/from	valu
straight	domdomi
for	lape
to/for	suri
around	dal
with	tuan
in/at	na

=== Demonstratives ===
==== Pronouns ====
There are four attested demonstrative pronouns in Mavea: aro, nel(e), maro, and male. Aro and nel(e) can also function as demonstrative determiners, and aro specifically only rarely appears as a pronoun, as in:

Mo-ṽe mo-pal aro [ma mo-pailu]
3SG-make 3SG-like here COMP 3SG-bent
'He makes (it) like this one here that is bent'

Maro ('this one') is used to refer to something nearby the speaker, and has the plural form maror, which is formed by affixing the plural suffix -re:

Or me ro ka-var sur maro ma matua=ku mo-adia
maybe FUT then 1SG.IRR-talk about this.one COMP right=1SG.POSS 3SG-first
'Maybe I will talk about this one that (is) on my right first'

Ma pula-ira maror i ṽat.
COMP CLF-3PL these.ones LIG four
'(The ones) that (are) theirs (are) these four ones.'

Male ('that one') on the other hand is used when speaking of something that is distant to the speaker, both literally, as in

Male m̃atan me ra-lsu mate=i=o
that.one COMP FUT 3PL-hit dead=TR=2SG
'That one (was) for the purpose that they would kill you'

And metaphorically, in order to distance the speaker from the referent, as in

Na vatavata le mo-pelmel paingur, male me i-l-ṽe Tomy pelmel
but woman DET 3SG-like.this stubborn that.one FUT 3SG.IRR-IMPF-make Tomy like.this
'But this woman is stubborn like this, that one will be making Tomy the same'

Malere is the plural form of male, and like maror is formed by affixing the plural -re:

Malere da-sops-varvara nira.
these.ones 1PL.INCL-NEG-talk 3PL
'These ones, we don't talk to them.'

Maro and male are both formed by combining the complementizer ma- and a locative adverbial; aro for the former, and ale for the latter.

==== Determiners ====
In addition to demonstrative pronouns, Mavea also has three demonstrative determiners: nele, (a)ro, and nor(o), although of these only nor(o) is not attested as a pronoun in addition to its role as a demonstrative determiner.

Demonstrative Determiners
	Singular	Plural
this	nel(e)	neler(e)
this here	(a)ro	ror
this here now	nor(o)	noror

The three-way demonstrative system common to Oceanic Languages is not present in Mavean demonstrative determiners, occurring instead in the locative adverbs of the language. The demonstrative determiners of Mavea encode both spatial and temporal proximity to either the speaker, as in

Ki-r-m̃a aro Mav̋ea.
1PL.EXCL-DL-come this.here Mav̋ea
'We came here, (to) Mav̋ea.'

or to the discourse, as in

Rau=n mo-sa mo-avtai nor aulu.
leaves=3SG.POSS 3SG-go.up 3SG-appear here.now above
'Its leaves go up and appear here on top.'

The plural forms neler(e), ror, and noror are formed by affixing what is likely a reduced form of the plural word re.

Nele, along with its plural form neler(e), is formed in part by the specific definite article le.

Nor(o), and its plural form noror, is actually made up in part by a cut down form of the third demonstrative determiner, (a)ro, while nele is not. Interestingly, the two demonstrative determiners which contain aro, that is nor(o) and (a)ro itself, are also the two demonstrative determiners which serve double duty as demonstrative pronouns, in addition to being used as locational adverbs, a function never assigned to nel(e)(re).

Additionally, one of the other demonstrative pronouns, maro, also has aro as one of its constituents.

Demonstrative determiners can refer to a location in both time and space, but the spatial location is often discourse-related, rather than speaker-related, as in the following example, where aro is used to refer anaphorically to a party (anana) that has previously been mentioned in the text:

Re m̃asi nirev ra-ṽa na anan-a aro.
PL bird.fish everyone 3PL-go LOC eat-NMZ here
'All the birds went to this party.'

This use is sometimes called the "tracking use". Ror, nor(o)(r), and nelere all also have anaphoric uses, as displayed in the following examples, where the noun phrase referents occurring prior to the demonstrative have each been mentioned previously:

Ro me ro tamlese ror i rua...
then FUT then old here.PL LIG two
'Then, these two men here...'

Ra-l-an ineler nelere
3PL-IMPF-eat thing.PL these.PL
'They are eating these things here.'

Inor nor me i-tuen nno
thing.PL here.now FUT 3SG.IRR-help 2SG
'These things here will help you.'

The demonstrative determiners of Mavea follow the head noun when used adnominally, a pattern which is the norm in oceanic languages, though by no means universal. Examples of this include:

Tam̃a-n navaisesea aro mo-m̃ata.
father-CONS child this.here 3SG-dead
'The father of this child here is dead.'

Ra-l-an ineler nelere.
3PL-IMPF-eat thing.PL these.PL
'They are eating these things here.'

=== Spatial deictics ===
==== Locative adverbs ====
Locative adverbs are a class of sentential adverb, modifying entire sentences, and as such occur either subsequent to the verb's core argument, as shown in:

Ra-kuro koneine 'Ai sar' ro ra-sa konain 'Panpan.'
3PL-leave there ai sar then 3PL-go.up there panpan
'They left there, 'Ai sar', then they went up there, 'Panpan'.

Or more rarely prior to the verb's core argument, as shown in:

Ṽisio-n maro mo-an nna.
meat=3SG.POSS this.one 3SG-eat 3SG
'His flesh, this one ate it.'

There are two sets of locative adverbs in Mavea, all members of which serve as spatial deictics. There is the A-set, so named because all of its members begin with [a], and the K-set, so named because each of its members begins with [ko]. They form a six-way system based on proximity to the hearer, and to the speaker, as well as relative direction (up, down, or across)

Spatial adverbs
aro	~	kon(a)ro	'here, at speaker's location'
aine	~	konain(e)/koenine	'there, at hearer's location'
ale	~	konale	'there, away from both interlocutors, but closer to hearer than speaker'
atu	~	konatu	'over there, away from both interlocutors'
atisi(vo)	~	konatisi(vo)	'over there down, far away from both interlocutors'
atisa	~	konatisa	'over there up, far away from both interlocutors'
atiṽa	~	konatiṽa	'over there across, far away from both interlocutors'

Atisi(vo), atisa, and atiṽa, as well as their K-set equivalents konatisi(vo), konatisa, and konatiṽa, are likely derived from the form atu (or konatu for the K-set), compounded with a movement verb like si(vo) ('go down'), sa ('go up'), or ṽa ('go'):

Nno ko-to aro nao ka-on ka-ṽa konatiṽa. Ka-val kil ṽa na vovono konatu.
2SG 2SG-stay here 1SG 1SG.IRR-look 1SG.IRR-go over.there 1SG.IRR-pass look go LOC REDbush over.there
'You stay here, I will go look over there. I will pass towards the bush over there.'

Ra-kuro koneine 'Ai sar' ro ra-sa konain 'Panpan.'
3PL-leave there ai sar then 3PL-go.up there panpan
'They left there, 'Ai sar', then they went up there, 'Panpan'.'

'Soon after I felt something touching my leg here.'

Speakers can emphasise the distance in the forms atisi(vo), atisa, and atiṽa, as well as their K-set forms konatisi(vo), konatisa, and konatiṽa by producing them with a long [t], e.g.: [a.'t:i.si].

There is no easily discernible semantic difference between the A-set and the K-set, however some members of the A-set may also serve as demonstratives, as in:

Mo-ṽe mo-pal aro [ma mo-pailu].
3SG-make 3SG-like here COMP 3SG-bent
'He makes (it) like (this one) here which is bent.'

which is not attested in any member of the K-set.

The spatial and temporal adverbs aro, aine, and kon(a)ro, as well as the demonstrative determiner nor(o), can be juxtaposed with a noun in order to form an adverbial predicate, as in

Ro, avona-n ululdunia aro.
then end-CONS story here.this
'Then the end of the story (is) here.' Or 'Then, this (is) the end of the story.'

Nna ne aine.
3SG FOC there
'It (is) there.'

'The third one (is) here, the fourth one (is) here.'

== Morphology ==
Personal pronouns in Mavea do not inflect for case or gender, but do show number (singular, dual, paucal, plural). First person non-singular has an inclusive/exclusive distinction. Independent personal pronouns are not obligatory, but are used for emphasis, contrast or focus.

		Singular	Dual	Paucal	Plural
1st person	inclusive	na(o)	darua/ô	datol	(n)ida
1st person	exclusive	na(o)	kam̋arua/o	kam̋atol	kam̋am
2nd person		nno	kamruo/a	kamtol	kam̋im
3rd person		nna	rarua/o	ratol	nira

me ro nno me ko -l -suruv atano, na nao me ro ka suruv aul pere -n vuae
FUT then 2SG FUT 2SG -IMPF -sleep ground but 1SG FUT then 1SG.IRR -sleep above branch -CONS tree
"You, you will sleep on the ground, but I, I will sleep in the tree"

=== Bound pronouns ===
Bound pronouns are obligatory at the beginning of a predicate phrase. Only 1SG and 3SG inflect for mood.

Subject Agreement Markers
		Singular		Dual	Paucal	Plural
		Realis	Irrealis	Dual	Paucal	Plural
1st person	inclusive	na-	ka-	dar-	datol-	da-
1st person	exclusive	na-	ka-	kir-	kitol-	ki-
2nd person		ko-	ko-	kir-	kitol-	ki-
3rd person		mo-	i-	rar-	ratol	ra-

Object Enclitics
		Singular	Plural
1st person	inclusive	-ao	(i)da
1st person	exclusive	-ao	
2nd person		-o	
3rd person		-a	(i)ra

Varua nno ko-kolai=ao
bird 2SG 2SG-lie=1SG
"Cardinal, you lied to me"

== Counting system ==
The Mavea counting system is very similar to other Oceanic languages, especially numbers 1 through 5, and 10.

1. tea
2. rua
3. tol(u)
4. vat(i)
5. lima
6. marava
7. rave rua
8. rattol(u)
9. rappat(i)
10. anavul(u)

== Possession ==
Mavea distinguishes direct and indirect possession. Direct possessive constructions nouns take a bound possessive clitic. On the other hand, indirect possession is expressed by the presence of a classifier to which a possessive clitic is suffixed.

=== Direct possession ===
Direct possession is expressed by a possessive clitic attached to the noun when the possessor is not expressed as a Noun Phrase (NP). Alternatively, if no suffix exists for the person and number of the possessor, the nouns are followed by an independent pronoun.

The semantic classes of nouns participating in direct possessive constructions, include, body parts, and bodily functions, kinship terms, articles of clothing, and household goods.

Table of Possessive Clitics
		Singular	Dual	Paucal/trial	Plural
1st person	inclusive	-ku	darua/o	datol	-(i)da
1st person	exclusive	-ku	-mamrua/o	-mamtol	-mam
2nd person		-m	-mrua/o	-mtol	-mim
3rd person		-n(a)	-rarua/o	ratol	-(i)ra

A noun, which is directly possessed, takes a possessive clitic matching the possessor's features.

For example:

Ka-deo mo-adia ro me ko-on tae=ku.
1SG.IRR-defecate 3SG-first then FUT 2SG-look excrement=lSG.POSS
'I will defecate first, then you will look at my excrement.'

and

This third person singular possessive clitic, pronounced as [na], is suffixed to the noun 'Laloa' for 'saliva'.

Lalao=na mo-si mo-va.
saliva=3SG.POSS 3SG-go.down 3SG-go
'Her saliva was hanging down.'

==== Non-pronominal possessors ====
If a full NP expresses the possessor, the possessee takes the construct suffix –n, or can be pronounces [na], although this construct suffix is a homophony of the possessive clitic –n and –na the distribution is different as displayed in the following examples;

Note that the case of Full NP, the possessee precedes the possessor

Ra-tau ese-n Piria.
3PL-put name-CONS wild.yam
'They named it Piria'

and

Natu-n vomae mo-sa mo-sakel na patu-n kou.
child-CONS dove 3SG-go.up 3SG-sit LOC head-CONS fowl
'Dove's child went up and sat on Fowl's head.

Possession is recursive, in the following example, the noun 'vulu' which is possessed by the noun 'vanatu' which in turn is possessed by John, therefore both nouns a suffixed with –[n].

vulu-n vanatu-n John
hair-CONS daughter-CONS John
'John's daughter's hair'

=== Indirect possession ===
Nouns in indirect possession constructions do not take a possessive clitic, they require a classifier to which a possessive clitic (or construct suffix) is attached.

There are six classifiers in Mavea:

1. a- 'to be eaten'
2. ma- 'to be drunk'
3. no- 'general possession, valuables'
4. pula- 'anima raised, vegetable planted'
5. sa- 'housing and land'
6. madoue- 'a dead man's possession'

classifier "a-" infers that the item is possessed is meant to be eaten

Mo-vir loko a=na.
3sG-throw laplap CLF.eat=3SG.POSS
'She threw his laplap (to eat)'

If the possessor is a full NP, the classifier is market with the construct -n

Nira ra-ve inanan vaisesea a-n re famli.
3pl 3PL-make food small CLF.eat-CONS PL family
'They make a small party for the families (to eat)'

Summarised

Possession Type	Possessee	Possessor
Direct	N -n N CLF -n	Personal Noun Personal Noun
Indirect	N -n N CLF -n	Personal Noun Personal Noun
Direct	N -n N CLF -n	Specific Specific
Indirect	N -n N CLF -n	Specific Specific
Direct	N (+human) -n N (-human) -i	Non-specific
Indirect	N CLF -n	Non-specific

== Questions ==
Intonation is used to distinguish yes–no questions because there is no syntactic way to do so. There are also tag questions which uses the negative tag /te modere/ at the end. In English, /te modere/ means "or not".

Some monoclausal content questions include:

- ape = where
- ingese = when
- ise = who
- ivisa = how much/many
- matai = for what reason
- matan = why
- sa = what
- sava = which/what kind?
- se = which
- sur sa = about/for what

== Negation ==
Sentential negation is expressed with the bound prefix /sopo/ and appears right after the subject agreement prefix. The order is subject → negation → verb.

mo -sopo- rongo = a
3SG NEG see = 3SG
he didn't see him

Sometimes /sopo/ can be shorten to /po/.

na -po- sasa
1SG NEG work
I don't work.

When the subject agreement marker is absent, the bare negation marker jumps to the front.

Sopo te ta-mavea...
NEG some from-Mav̋ea
There is not one Mav̋ea man...

To show the aspectual meaning "not yet", /lo/ is added to the negation marker /sopo/. This refers to events that have not happened yet but are likely to in the future. Added to the end of this form of negation is /pa/ which means "still" or "yet".

{nno ko} sopo -l- on diu pa?
2SG NEG IMPF look crab yet?
you haven't seen a coconut crab yet?

When combined with /me/ the negation changes into "not anymore, no more".

mo-sopo - me - l - suruv
3SG-NEG - IT - IMPF - sleep
She does not sleep anymore.

Equative clauses are shown by adding the negative marker /sopo/ to the subject marker for third person singular /mo-/. Mosopo meaning " it is/was/not."

Ko-v mo-sopo nno.
2SG-say 3SG-NEG 2SG
You said it wasn't you.

Negative locational predicates are similar to equative clauses, by adding the locational marker /na/ to the equative clause /mosopo/.

Mo-sopo na ono.
3SG-NEG LOC sand.
It is not on the sand.

== Sources ==
- Guérin, Valérie (2011). A Grammar of Mavea: An Oceanic Language of Vanuatu (PDF). Oceanic Linguistics Special Publications, No. 39. Honolulu: University of Hawai'i press. p. 424. ISBN 978-0-8248-3639-9.
- Guérin, Valérie (2008). Discovering Mavea: Grammar, texts, and lexicon. Honolulu: Doctor of Philosophy in Linguistics, University of Hawai'i press.
- Gunter, Senft (2004). Deixis and demonstratives in Oceanic languages. Australian National University, Research School of Pacific and Asian Studies. p. 179. ISBN 0-85883-551-7. OCLC 902361921.
