= Kiai language =

Austronesian language spoken in Vanuatu

Kiai
- Fortsenal
- Vara Kiai
- Native to: Vanuatu
- Region: Espiritu Santo Island
- Native speakers: (450 cited 2001)
- Language family: Austronesian: Malayo-Polynesian; Oceanic; Southern Oceanic; North-Central Vanuatu; North Vanuatu; Espiritu Santo; Kiai

Official status
- Official language in: Vanuatu

Language codes
- ISO 639-3: frt
- Glottolog: fort1240
- ELP: Kiai
- Kiai is not endangered according to the classification system of the UNESCO Atlas of the World's Languages in Danger

Kiai or Fortsenal (Fortsenal: na vara Kiai) is an Oceanic language spoken by about 450 people in the central highlands of Espiritu Santo, an island in Sanma Province, Vanuatu.

== Classification ==
Kiai is a Austronesian language. It is a member of the Oceanic branch of the Austronesian languages, and has been further classified as part of the North-Central Vanuatu languages. The Tasiriki and Wailapa languages are its closest relatives, and are spoken to the southwest of Kiai.

John Lynch has proposed that Kiai, Tasiriki, Wailapa, and other languages on the western half of Espiritu Santo form a West Santo group, as all these language have merged proto-Santo alveolar and velar stops into velar or glottal stops.

== Name ==
The name Kiai derives from kiai, meaning "no", due to a trend in the area to name languages based on their word for "no", used as a linguistic shibboleth. The language is called vara Kiai (from vara "speech, language"), i.e. 'the language that says kiai [for no]".

The same language has been named Fortsenal, based on the name of the village (locally Vorozenale) where the speakers live.

== Geographic distribution ==
In 1989, the language was spoken within the Ari and Tazia valleys on the island of Espiritu Santo in Vanuatu. The Kiai speaking communities comprised "scattered hamlets" on mountain ridges. A few Kiai speakers also migrated down to the island's south coast in the 1980s, establishing a community along the Waylapa River.

== Phonology ==
=== Consonants ===
Ludvigson documented 16 consonant sounds in Kiai, although he was not certain if they were all distinct phonemes. He listed the prenasalized voiced alveolar stop (ⁿd) as the only voiced alveolar stop, but listed both prenasalized (ᵐb) and non-prenasalized (b) voiced bilabial stops.

Kiai consonants
	Bilabial		Alveolar		Velar		Glottal
Plosive	p	b	t	ⁿd	k	ɡ	
Affricate			ts				
Fricative			s				h
Nasal		m		n		ŋ	
Trill				r			
Lateral approximant				l			

=== Vowels ===
Kiai has at least five and possibly as many as eight monophthong vowel phonemes, and a further eight diphthongs. The diphthongs are: /ai/, /ei/, /oi/, /oe/, /au/, /eu/, /iu/, and /ou/.

Kiai Monophthongs
	Front	Central	Back
	unrounded	unrounded	rounded
Close	i ⟨i⟩		u ⟨u⟩
Close-mid	e ⟨e⟩	ʌ ⟨a⟩	
Mid		ə ⟨e⟩	
Open-mid	ɛ ⟨e⟩		ɔ ⟨o⟩
Open		a ⟨a⟩	

== Writing system ==
Kiai can be written in a Latin-script alphabet. Generally, the letters of the Kiai writing system align with the International Phonetic Alphabet, with some exceptions for allophonic variation or ease of transcription. For instance, /ŋ/ is transcribed as ⟨ng⟩.
