= Amblong language =

Oceanic language spoken in Vanuatu

Amblong
- Varavara, Aje
- Native to: Vanuatu
- Region: Espiritu Santo
- Native speakers: 300 (2015)
- Language family: Austronesian: Malayo-Polynesian; Oceanic; Southern Oceanic; North-Central Vanuatu; North Vanuatu; Espiritu Santo; Amblong

Language codes
- ISO 639-3: alm
- Glottolog: ambl1237
- ELP: Varavara
- Amblong is classified as Definitely Endangered by the UNESCO Atlas of the World's Languages in Danger.

Amblong is an Oceanic language or dialect spoken on inland southeastern Espiritu Santo Island in Vanuatu, in the village of Amblong.

The language is probably endangered; children do not tend to learn it.

== Names ==
The alternate names for Amblong are Varavara and Aje.

== Classification ==
Amblong is generally classified as a language, but has also been tentatively classified as a dialect of the proposed South-Central Santo language along with Ande and Narango.

== Selected vocabulary ==
The list below is a selected sample of words in Amblong:

Amblong	English
moyi	mosquito
mo-tol	three
oragʷe	he
