= Butmas language =

Language of Vanuatu

Butmas
- Butmas-Tur
- Farafi
- Native to: Vanuatu
- Region: Santo Island
- Native speakers: (520 cited 1983)
- Language family: Austronesian: Malayo-Polynesian; Oceanic; Southern Oceanic; North-Central Vanuatu; North Vanuatu; Espiritu Santo; Butmas

Language codes
- ISO 639-3: bnr
- Glottolog: butm1237
- ELP: Butmas-Tur
- Butmas is not endangered according to the classification system of the UNESCO Atlas of the World's Languages in Danger

Butmas is a language of the interior of Santo Island in Vanuatu.

== Names ==
Alternate names for Butmas are Ati, Butmas-Tur and Farafi.
