= Bura language (Vanuatu) =

Espiritu Santo language of Vanuatu

Bura
- Native to: Vanuatu
- Region: Espiritu Santo
- Native speakers: 300 (2010)
- Language family: Austronesian: Malayo-Polynesian; Oceanic; Southern Oceanic; North-Central Vanuatu; North Vanuatu; Espiritu Santo; Bura

Language codes
- ISO 639-3: None (mis)
- Glottolog: bura1300
- ELP: Bura
- Bura is not endangered according to the classification system of the UNESCO Atlas of the World's Languages in Danger

Bura is an Espiritu Santo language of Vanuatu with 300 speakers.

== Sources ==
- François, Alexandre; Franjieh, Michael; Lacrampe, Sébastien; Schnell, Stefan (2015), "The exceptional linguistic density of Vanuatu", in François, Alexandre; Lacrampe, Sébastien; Franjieh, Michael; Schnell, Stefan (eds.), The Languages of Vanuatu: Unity and Diversity, Studies in the Languages of Island Melanesia, Canberra: Asia Pacific Linguistics Open Access, pp. 1–21, ISBN 9781922185235.
- Tryon, Darrell. 2010. The languages of Espiritu Santo, Vanuatu. In John Bowden and Nikolaus P. Himmelmann and Malcolm Ross (eds.), A journey through Austronesian and Papuan linguistic and cultural space: papers in honour of Andrew K. Pawley, 283–290. Canberra: Research School of Pacific and Asian Studies, Australian National University.
