= Navut language =

Oceanic language spoken in Vanuatu

Navut
- Sinia
- Native to: Vanuatu
- Region: Espiritu Santo
- Native speakers: (520 cited 1983)
- Language family: Austronesian: Malayo-Polynesian; Oceanic; Southern Oceanic; North-Central Vanuatu; North Vanuatu; Espiritu Santo; Navut

Language codes
- ISO 639-3: nsw
- Glottolog: navu1237
- ELP: Bura; Sinia
- Navut is not endangered according to the classification system of the UNESCO Atlas of the World's Languages in Danger

Navut (or Sinia) is an Oceanic language spoken in central Espiritu Santo Island in Vanuatu.
