= Toksiki language =

Oceanic language spoken in Vanuatu

Toksiki
- Soisoru, Roria
- Native to: Vanuatu
- Region: Espiritu Santo
- Ethnicity: 100 (no date)
- Native speakers: 75 (2001)
- Language family: Austronesian: Malayo-Polynesian; Oceanic; Southern Oceanic; North-Central Vanuatu; North Vanuatu; Espiritu Santo; Toksiki

Language codes
- ISO 639-3: rga
- Glottolog: rori1237 (with Mores)
- ELP: Toksiki

Toksiki (alternatively Soisoru or Roria) is an Oceanic language spoken in central Espiritu Santo Island in Vanuatu.
