= Nethalp language =

East Santo language spoken in Vanuatu

Nethalp
- Lorediakarkar
- Native to: Vanuatu
- Region: Santo Island, east coast
- Extinct: No native speakers, considered dormant
- Language family: Austronesian: Malayo-Polynesian; Oceanic; Southern Oceanic; North-Central Vanuatu; North Vanuatu; Espiritu Santo; Nethalp

Language codes
- ISO 639-3: lnn
- Glottolog: lore1244
- ELP: Tholp; Lorediakarkar
- Lorediakarkar is classified as Critically Endangered by the UNESCO Atlas of the World's Languages in Danger.

Nethalp, or Lorediakarkar, is a dormant or extinct language of the East Santo languages, a group of languages in the Austronesian family of Languages. It was spoken by an ethnic population of on Espiritu Santo Island in Vanuatu. It was close geographically and linguistically to the Shark Bay language.
