= Narango language =

Oceanic language spoken in Vanuatu

Narango
- Farsaf, Farsav, Nambel
- Native to: Vanuatu
- Region: Espiritu Santo
- Native speakers: 400
- Language family: Austronesian: Malayo-Polynesian; Oceanic; Southern Oceanic; North-Central Vanuatu; North Vanuatu; Espiritu Santo; Narango

Language codes
- ISO 639-3: nrg
- Glottolog: nara1263
- ELP: Farsaf
- Narango is not endangered according to the classification system of the UNESCO Atlas of the World's Languages in Danger

Narango (Farsaf, Farsav, Nambel) is an Oceanic language spoken on the south coast of Espiritu Santo Island in Vanuatu.
