= Polonombauk language =

Austronesian language spoken in Vanuatu

Polonombauk
- Ati
- Native to: Vanuatu
- Region: Santo Island
- Ethnicity: 550
- Native speakers: 120 (2007)
- Language family: Austronesian: Malayo-Polynesian; Oceanic; Southern Oceanic; North-Central Vanuatu; North Vanuatu; Espiritu Santo; Polonombauk

Language codes
- ISO 639-3: plb
- Glottolog: polo1242
- ELP: Narmoris; Ati (Vanuatu)
- Polonombauk is classified as Definitely Endangered by the UNESCO Atlas of the World's Languages in Danger.

Polonombauk (Meris, Miris, Ati) is a language of the interior of the southeast of Santo Island in Vanuatu.

François (2015:18-21) also lists Narmoris under the ISO 639-3 code [plb].

== Sources ==
- François, Alexandre; Franjieh, Michael; Lacrampe, Sébastien; Schnell, Stefan (2015), "The exceptional linguistic density of Vanuatu", in François, Alexandre; Lacrampe, Sébastien; Franjieh, Michael; Schnell, Stefan (eds.), The Languages of Vanuatu: Unity and Diversity, Studies in the Languages of Island Melanesia, Canberra: Asia Pacific Linguistics Open Access, pp. 1–21, ISBN 9781922185235.
