= Tasmate language =

Oceanic language of Vanuatu

Tasmate
- Oa, Meri
- Native to: Vanuatu
- Region: Espiritu Santo
- Native speakers: (150 cited 1983)
- Language family: Austronesian: Malayo-Polynesian; Oceanic; Southern Oceanic; North-Central Vanuatu; North Vanuatu; Espiritu Santo; Tasmate

Language codes
- ISO 639-3: tmt
- Glottolog: tasm1246
- ELP: Tasmate
- Tasmate is not endangered according to the classification system of the UNESCO Atlas of the World's Languages in Danger

Tasmate (alternatively Oa or Meri) is an Oceanic language spoken in the north of Espiritu Santo Island in Vanuatu.
