= Wusi language =

Oceanic language spoken in Vanuatu

Wusi
- Kula
- Native to: Vanuatu
- Region: Espiritu Santo
- Native speakers: 300 (2001)
- Language family: Austronesian: Malayo-Polynesian; Oceanic; Southern Oceanic; North-Central Vanuatu; North Vanuatu; Espiritu Santo; Wusi

Language codes
- ISO 639-3: wsi
- Glottolog: wusi1237
- ELP: Wusi
- Wusi is not endangered according to the classification system of the UNESCO Atlas of the World's Languages in Danger

Wusi (Wusi-Kerepua) is an Oceanic language spoken on the west coast of Espiritu Santo Island in Vanuatu.
