= Vunapu language =

Oceanic language of Vanuatu

Vunapu
- Native to: Vanuatu
- Region: Espiritu Santo
- Native speakers: (380 cited 1983)
- Language family: Austronesian: Malayo-Polynesian; Oceanic; Southern Oceanic; North-Central Vanuatu; North Vanuatu; Espiritu Santo; Vunapu

Language codes
- ISO 639-3: vnp
- Glottolog: vuna1239
- ELP: Vunapu
- Vunapu is not endangered according to the classification system of the UNESCO Atlas of the World's Languages in Danger

Vunapu is an Oceanic language spoken in northern Espiritu Santo Island in Vanuatu.
