= Se language =

Se language may refer to:

- Fanafo language of Espiritu Santo, Vanuatu
- Erromanga language of southern Vanuatu
- Saxwe language of Benin, West Africa
