= Wailapa language =

Language

Wailapa
- Moiso, Ale
- Native to: Vanuatu
- Region: Espiritu Santo
- Native speakers: 500
- Language family: Austronesian: Malayo-Polynesian; Oceanic; Southern Oceanic; North-Central Vanuatu; North Vanuatu; Espiritu Santo; Wailapa

Language codes
- ISO 639-3: wlr
- Glottolog: wail1242
- ELP: Wailapa
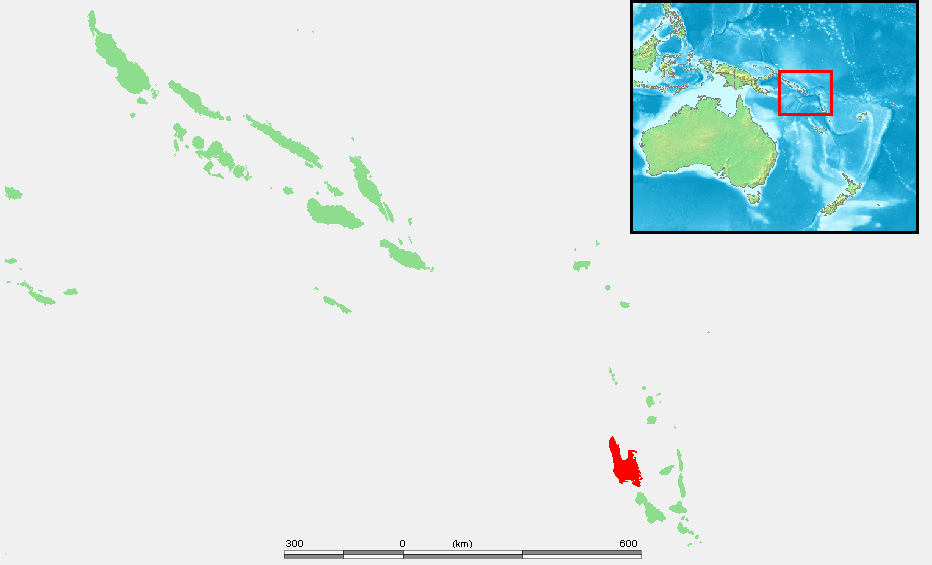
- Espiritu Santo, where Wailapa is spoken on the southern coast

- Wailapa is not endangered according to the classification system of the UNESCO Atlas of the World's Languages in Danger

Wailapa, or Moiso or Ale, is an Oceanic language or dialect spoken on Espiritu Santo Island in Vanuatu.

It is possibly endangered, with its status described as "shifting". It is also described as "stable".

It has multiple dialects.

== Classification ==
Wailapa is generally described as a language, but also as a dialect of the proposed, lexicostastically defined Southwest Santo language along with Araki, Tangoa, and Akei.

== Selected vocabulary ==
The list below is a sample of words in Wailapa.

Wailapa	English
patu-ku	head
umʷi-ku	beard
tamanpatu-ku	belly
laso-ku	testicles
marau-ku	left hand
tˢino-ima	door
tikinoβu	centipede
lano	fly (n)
moɂi	mosquito
paɂeo	shark
apa-na	wing
tˢio	grasshopper
aβua	turtle
korui niu	dry coconut
pioro	sandalwood
matˢoe	star
βusiβusi	sand
βaliβali tasi	foam
paka	bow
soɂo	digging stick
βuro	fight
tˢoriɂa	yellow
mo tolu	three
raβurua	seven
mo-βisa	how many
taun	year
inia	he
inira	they
atia	bite
ɂaniɂan	eat
sisia apu	blow
kunu	run
