= Piamatsina language =

Oceanic language of Vanuatu

Piamatsina
- Native to: Vanuatu
- Region: Espiritu Santo
- Native speakers: 250
- Language family: Austronesian: Malayo-Polynesian; Oceanic; Southern Oceanic; North-Central Vanuatu; North Vanuatu; Espiritu Santo; Piamatsina

Language codes
- ISO 639-3: ptr
- Glottolog: piam1242
- ELP: Piamatsina
- Piamatsina is not endangered according to the classification system of the UNESCO Atlas of the World's Languages in Danger

Piamatsina, or Tapiafaru, is an Oceanic language spoken in the north of Espiritu Santo Island in Vanuatu.
