= Fanafo language =

Oceanic language spoken in Vanuatu

Fanafo
- Native to: Vanuatu
- Region: Espiritu Santo
- Native speakers: 20 (2010)
- Language family: Austronesian: Malayo-Polynesian; Oceanic; Southern Oceanic; North-Central Vanuatu; North Vanuatu; Espiritu Santo; Fanafo

Language codes
- ISO 639-3: None (mis)
- ELP: Se

Fanafo (or Se) is an Espiritu Santo language of Vanuatu. It is spoken by 20 people in Vanafo and Butmas villages of eastern Santo Island.
