= Ende language =

Ende may refer to the following languages:

- Ende language (Indonesia), an Austronesian language of Flores Island, Indonesia
- Ende language (Sulawesi), an Austronesian language of Sulawesi, Indonesia
- Ende language (Papua New Guinea), a Papuan language of Papua New Guinea

== See also ==
- Ande language, an Austronesian language of Vanuatu
