= Tambotalo language =

Oceanic language of Vanuatu

Tambotalo
- Biliru
- Native to: Vanuatu
- Region: Espiritu Santo
- Native speakers: (50 cited 1981)
- Language family: Austronesian: Malayo-Polynesian; Oceanic; Southern Oceanic; North-Central Vanuatu; North Vanuatu; Espiritu Santo; Tambotalo

Language codes
- ISO 639-3: tls
- Glottolog: tamb1253
- ELP: Biliru
- Tambotalo is classified as Severely Endangered by the UNESCO Atlas of the World's Languages in Danger.

Tambotalo, or Biliru, is a nearly extinct Oceanic language spoken in a single village in the southeast of Espiritu Santo Island in Vanuatu.
