= Valpei language =

Austronesian language spoken in Vanuatu

Valpei
- Native to: Vanuatu
- Region: Espiritu Santo
- Native speakers: (300 cited 1983)
- Language family: Austronesian: Malayo-Polynesian; Oceanic; Southern Oceanic; North-Central Vanuatu; North Vanuatu; Espiritu Santo; Valpei

Language codes
- ISO 639-3: vlp
- Glottolog: valp1237
- ELP: Valpei
- Valpei is not endangered according to the classification system of the UNESCO Atlas of the World's Languages in Danger

Valpei (Valpei-Hukua) is an Oceanic language spoken on the northern tip of Espiritu Santo Island in Vanuatu.
