= Merei-Tiale language =

Austronesian language spoken in Vanuatu

Merei
- Malmariv
- Region: Espiritu Santo Island, Vanuatu
- Native speakers: (800 cited 1997–2001)
- Language family: Austronesian: Malayo-Polynesian; Oceanic; Southern Oceanic; North-Central Vanuatu; North Vanuatu; Espiritu Santo; Merei

Language codes
- ISO 639-3: Either: mnl – Tiale lmb – Merei
- Glottolog: tial1239 Tiale mere1242 Merei
- ELP: Merei
- Malmariv is classified as Vulnerable by the UNESCO Atlas of the World's Languages in Danger.

Merei or Malmariv is an Oceanic language spoken in north central Espiritu Santo Island in Vanuatu.

There are two varieties, Tiale, or Malmariv, and Merei, or Lametin. They are mutually intelligible according to a comparison of 234 words, which showed 94.87% cognate similarity. There are an estimated 800 speakers of Malmariv-Merei or Tiale-Lametin. Merei, as well as Tiale, are both spoken by roughly 60% of the children in the villages. The members of the population have a positive attitude towards the threatened language, with Merei being spoken by approximately 400 people as a mother tongue. There are at least four villages where Merei is spoken, Angoru, Navele, Tombet and Vusvogo. These villages are located between the Ora and Lape rivers in the central area of Espiritu Santo Island.

Merei is an SVO language, aligning itself with many of the typical Oceanic features. Subject pronouns, modality, and aspect markers occur preverbally, object pronouns and aspect adverbs follow the verb, and possessives are divided into direct and indirect (or inalienable and alienable respectively).

== Phonology ==
Merei has a phoneme inventory consisting of sixteen consonants and five vowels. The combinations of vowels can form nine diphthongs.

=== Consonants ===
		Labial	Alveolar	Palatal	Velar
Nasal		m	n		ŋ
Stop	voiceless	p	t		k
Stop	prenasalized	ᵐb	ⁿd		ᵑg
Affricate				d͡ʒ	
Fricative		v	s		
Approximant			l ɾ	j	

There is also a consonant previously listed in the consonant chart written as |pm|.

=== Vowels ===
	Front	Central	Back
High	i		u
Mid	e		o
Low		a	

Merei has a common 5 vowel system that languages like Spanish have.

Diphthongs
	a	e	i	o	u
a		ae	ai	ao	au
e			ei		
i					
o			oi		ou
u		ue	ui		

== Morphology ==
=== Pronouns and person markers ===
The pronominal system contains two free-form categories, independent pronouns and preverbal subject pronouns, and two bound categories, object pronominal suffix and possessive pronominal suffix. No gender or animate distinction is made. Pronouns only have animate reference.

The pronominal system makes a distinction between first, second and third persons. Singular, dual, and plural are marked by number. First person dual and plural makes the distinction between inclusive and exclusive.

==== Independent pronouns ====
Independent pronouns
		Singular	Dual	Plural
1st person	inclusive	nao	de rua	de
1st person	exclusive	nao	gamau rua	gamau
2nd person		go	gami rua	gami
3rd person		nie	ire rua	ire

In this example we see the 2nd person independent pronoun being used as a speech act of invitation.

i go
ART.PN 2SG
'You (eat it).' (as one is giving you food).

Example 2 shows use of the first person plural exclusive independent pronoun gamau.

Kam ta usi ko arongo/ ko sio peser i gamau tui.
2PL REAL ask 2SG today 2SG down with ART.PN EX.PL PER
'We asked you today for you to stay with us.'

==== Preverbal subject pronouns and suffixes ====
Preverbal subject pronouns
		Singular	Dual	Plural
1st person	inclusive	na/nam	tera	te
1st person	exclusive	na/nam	kamara	kama
2nd person		ko	kamra	kam
3rd person		Ø		

Object pronominal suffix
		Singular	Dual	Plural
1st person	inclusive	-iau	-da rau	-da
1st person	exclusive	-iau	-mau rua	-mau
2nd person		-ko	-mi rua	-mi
3rd person		Ø	-ra rua	-ra

Example 3 below uses the preverbal subject pronoun nam and the possessive pronominal suffix -gu.

Nam ta tai ia jingo-m ko ta tai ia sala-gu.
1SG REAL make ART.CN mouth-2SG 2SG REAL make ART.CN road-1SG.
‘I make your mouth and you make my road.’

Example 4 below demonstrates the absence of a 3rd person singular preverbal subject pronoun and also contains the 3rd person plural pronominal suffix -ra.

Ø ta vai-ra mate.
3SG REAL make-3PL died.
‘He cause them to die.’

==== Reflexive pronouns ====
Reflexive pronouns are formed from the root nese- followed by a possessive pronominal suffix. It can be used in concurrence with the free pronoun and is often followed by the free particle nga 'only' as seen in example 5 and 6 below.

I nau nese-gu nga nam ta sioto.
ART.PN 1SG self-1SG only 1SG REAL stay.
‘Just I myself stay.’

Nam ta jip nese-gu nga.
1SG REAL cut self-1SG only.
‘I cut myself.’

==== Demonstrative pronouns ====
Demonstrative pronouns consist of a mix of locational adverbs and third person pronouns. They have three possible functions: they can occupy the whole noun phrase slot, act as an independent nominal argument or be placed at the end of a noun phrase to modify the noun-head. The classifications of demonstrative adverbs are based on two aspects: speaker-hearer reference and spatial reference.

	Singular	Plural
close to both speaker and hearer	get-nie	get-ire
close to the speaker	na-nie	na-ire
close to the hearer	gata-nie	gata-ire
uncertain/not visible	ani-nie	ani-ire

Shows get-nie a speaker hearer referenced demonstrative pronoun:

Get-nie ia sava?
this ART.CN what
'What is this?'

Shows get-ire a speaker hearer referenced demonstrative pronoun:

Iadu tese get-ire tato toma?
ART.CN.PL man these REAL:3PL what.happen
'What are these men doing?

Spatial reference demonstrative pronouns are formed by the third person independent pronouns, nie and ire when linked to spatial adverbial adverbs.

		Proximal	Intermediate	Distal
ascending direction	singular	ai-sa-nie	ma-ja-nie	le-sa-nie
ascending direction	plural	ai-sa-ire	ma-ja-ire	le-sa-ire
at same level	singular	ai-va-nie	ai-va-nie/le-va-nie	le-va-nie
at same level	plural	ai-va-ire	ai-va-ire/le-va-ire	le-va-ire
descending direction	singular	ai-sio-nie	ma-jio-nie	le-sio-nie
descending direction	plural	ai-sio-ire	ma-jio-ire	e-sio-ire

leva-nie
far.horizontal.3SG
'That far horizontal'

la tese leva-nie Ø ta logologo.
ART.CN man far.horizontal-3SG 3SG REAL bad.
'That man is bad' (referring to a man who is a long way from the speaker)

==== Possessive constructions ====
Possessive pronominal suffix
		Singular	Dual	Plural
1st person	inclusive	-gu	-da rua	-da
1st person	exclusive	-gu	-mau rua	-mau
2nd person		-m	-mi rua	-mi
3rd person		-na	-ra rua	-ra

In the Malmariv language, there are two possessive formations, direct and indirect. In certain situations, both of them are simultaneously possible. When in this predicament, if the possessed is more closely linked to the possessor, then it is classed as direct poIndirect Possessiond to indirect possession.

The possessive construction of the Merei language is typical Oceanic. There are different types of the classifiers and genitive prepositions of indirect possessive according to the edibility of the noun heads, however the word for tattoo ‘bur’ is an exception to the edible noun class.

Pronominal object suffixes and non-singular pronominal possessive suffixes are practically identical.

===== Direct possession =====
In direct pronominal possession a possessed inalienable noun head is followed by a poBoth Direct and Indirect Possession shown in table 4 above. This type of formation is normally related with body parts, familial terms, and relationships between location and part-whole connections.

Examples 11, 12 and 13 show the relative possessive pronominal suffix pairing with the possessed noun.

ia mata-m
ART.CN eye-2SG
‘your eye’

i nanu-gu
ART.PN child-1SG
‘my child’

la vsa-na
LOC.TEMP.PREP top-3SG
‘on its top’

The directly possessed noun is followed by the possessor noun phrase when the possessor is a nominal. This is shown in examples 14, 15 and 16.

ia natu ia bo
ART.CN child ART.CN pig
'the pigs child'

ia lma i Pita
ART.CN hand ART.PN Pita
'Peter's hand'

i rabui i Pita
ART.PN mother ART.PN Pita
‘Peter’s mother'

===== Indirect Possession =====
With indirect pronominal possession, there is a Possessive Classifier that precedes the indirectly possessed alienable noun head. The Possessive Classifier for inedible nouns is nou- (POSSC.I), and a- (or less commonly na-) for edible and drinkable nouns (POSSC.E), followed by the possessive pronominal suffix.

Example 17 shows the Possessive Classifier for inedible nouns

nou-gu uma
POSS.INED-1SG garden
‘my garden’

Example 18 shows the Possessive Classifier for edible and drinkable nouns

a-gu sna
POSS.ED-1SG yam
‘my yam’

In indirect nominal possession the indirectly possessive noun head is followed by a genitive preposition, nui for inedible (GEN.I) and nai for edible (GEN.E), which are followed by the possessor noun.

Example 19 shows the genitive preposition for inedible nouns

ia bo nui Loretta
ART.CN pig GEN.INED Loretta
'Loretta's pig'

Example 20 shows the genitive preposition for edible nouns

ia sei-beda nai Loretta
ART.CN piece-taro GEN.ED Loretta
'Loretta's taro-piece'

The benefactive preposition sei can also function as genitive preposition. it operates as part of the noun phrase and functions like a descriptive normal modifier or a possessive construction.

ia tese sei Vila
ART.CN man BEN Vila
'the man from Vila'

===== Both Direct and Indirect Possession =====
Many Oceanic languages have the ability to possess nouns both directly and indirectly. This difference in possession changes the meaning of the nouns affected. In indirect possession, the relationship between the possessed and the possessor is not as close as the direct possessive.

Examples 22 and 23 below show the difference that indirect and direct possession have on the noun 'night'.

ia nou-gu bong
ART.CN POSS.INED night
'my night' (the day of celebration for me)

ia bong i ia vla Ø ta ese
ART.CN night ART.PN ART.CN month 3SG REAL one
'the first day of the month'

The following examples show the difference that indirect and direct possession have on the noun 'road'.

ia nou-gu sala
ART.CN POSS.INED road
‘my road’

ia sala-gu
ART.CN road-1SG
‘my way’ (way of going or doing thing)

== Negation and Modality ==
Negation is closely related to Modality in Merei, and negation can be considered a propositional modality (cited in,). Thus it is useful to discuss the two in the same section. There are three modalities in Merei, realis (R), presupposition (PSP), and irrealis (IRR).

Modality markers
		Positive			Negative	
		Realis	Presupposition	Irrealis	Presupposition	Realis/Irrealis
Non-third person		ta	ø		tei	
Third Person	Singular	ta	a	mo	atei	motei/mutei
Third Person	Dual	tara	ara	mora	aratei	moratei
Third Person	Plural	tato	ato	moto	ateita	moteita/muteita

All non-third person forms of negative modality markers share the same form tei. The third person singular and dual negative forms can be formed by adding tei to the end of the positive form, whereas in the plural tei is added to the suffix -ta.

Negative third person dual irrealis modality:

Ia esio peser ia maji moratei vai
ART.CN kingfisher with ART.CN fish IRR.3D.NEG do
'The kingfisher and the fish did not do (it)'

Negation in verbless equative clauses is marked by the irrealis marker mo or mu followed by the negative marker tei. This comes before the second noun phrase, the particle mo or mu is used for all persons.

I nau motei na tasale
ART.PN 1 IRR.3.NEG ART.CN white-man
'I am not a white-man'

I nie motei na tija
ART.PN 3 IRR.3.NEG ART.CN teacher
'He is not a teacher'

Negative existential clauses are formed in Merei by following the basic intransitive structure of a verbal clause.

Verbal clause structure
(Subject noun phrase)	Verb phrase	(Object noun phrase)	(Prepositional phrase)	(Location phrase)	(Time phrase)

To form a negative existential clause the predicate slot is replaced by the verb va 'go' which is followed by the negative deictic merei and the clause takes only a single subject.

Existential clause

Ia bo ø ta dauva
ART.CN pig 3SG REAL exist
'There is a pig'

Negative existential clause

Ia bo va merei
ART.CN pig g use
‘There is no pig’

By adding the particle of prohibition tla after the subject pronoun, imperative and hortative clauses can be negated. This can function as either prohibition or pleading, depending on context and intonation. The distinction between prohibition and pleading depends on the meaning of the verbs and intonation or it may require a more specific declaration.

Ko tla an
2SG PROHIB eat
'Don't eat'

Te tla voro
IN.PL PROHIB leave
'Let's not leave'

Kamara tla bat-voro-in
EX.DU PROHIB head-empty-OD
'Let's us not be naughty'

== Bibliography ==
- Chung, Ying Shing Anthony (2005). A descriptive grammar of Merei (Vanuatu). Canberra: Pacific Linguistics. ISBN 0-85883-560-6. OCLC 70282773.
