= Aore language =

Austronesian language spoken in Vanuatu

Aore
- Native to: Vanuatu
- Region: Espiritu Santo
- Extinct: 1980s
- Language family: Austronesian: Malayo-Polynesian; Oceanic; Southern Oceanic; North-Central Vanuatu; North Vanuatu; Espiritu Santo; Aore

Language codes
- ISO 639-3: aor
- Glottolog: aore1237
- ELP: Aore
- Aore is classified as Extinct by the UNESCO Atlas of the World's Languages in Danger.

Aore is a recently extinct Oceanic language spoken on Aore Island, just off Espiritu Santo Island in Vanuatu.
