= Akei language =

Austronesian language spoken in Vanuatu

Akei
- Tasiriki
- Native to: Vanuatu
- Region: Espiritu Santo
- Native speakers: (650 cited 1981)
- Language family: Austronesian: Malayo-Polynesian; Oceanic; Southern Oceanic; North-Central Vanuatu; North Vanuatu; Espiritu Santo; Akei

Language codes
- ISO 639-3: tsr
- Glottolog: akei1237
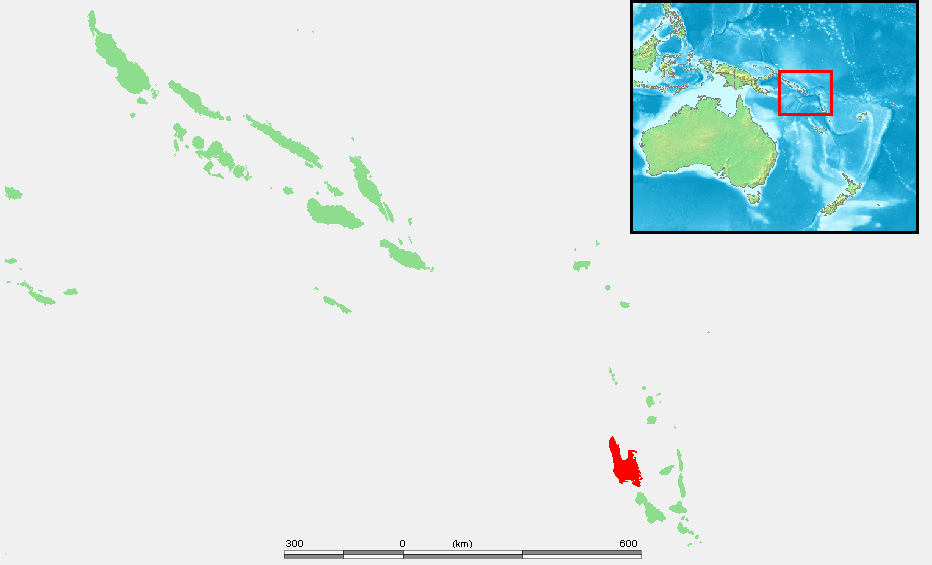
- Espiritu Santo, where Akei is spoken on the southwestern coast

- Akei is not endangered according to the classification system of the UNESCO Atlas of the World's Languages in Danger

Akei, or Tasiriki, is an Oceanic language or dialect spoken in southwestern coastal Espiritu Santo in Vanuatu, centred in the village of Tasiriki. In 1981, it was estimated to have 650 speakers.

== Names ==
Other names for Akei are Eralado, Ipayato, Lamarakai, Marino, Navaka, Penantsiro, Pilipili, Tasiriki and Wailapa, presumably based on the areas where it is spoken. The alternate name Tasiriki literally means "small water" (tasi "water", riki "small").

== Classification ==
Akei is generally described as a language, but also as a dialect of the proposed, lexicostastically defined Southwest Santo language along with Araki, Tangoa, and Wailapa. It has also been described as a dialect chain, with its dialects on either end of the chain not being mutually intelligible with each other.

== Phonology ==
Akei's vowels are a, e, i, o, and u. Its consonants are r, l, k, ', j, t, n, p, mp, b, mb, m, v, s and z. However, the precise phonemes these letters represent are uncertain.

== Grammar ==
=== Nouns ===
Akei has no articles.

Akei mostly lacks grammatical gender, although for some nouns denoting relationships the feminine is marked by the prefix ve- (e.g. natuna "his son", but venatuna "his daughter"). In other cases, natural sex is indicated by separate words or by takuni ("male") or pita ("female") following the noun (e.g. tavasao takuni "man-servant", tavasao pita "maid-servant").

Plurals are unmarked and are shown only by juxtaposition of an adjective or pronoun (e.g. mazi alulusi "many animals"). In enumeration the word ravai precedes and forms the plural of relationship nouns (e.g. Isau te vatira pita isina, ravai natuna, ravai venatuna, ravai takuni povi isina "Esau took them his wife, his sons, his daughters, all his people").

Agent nouns are formed by the word takuni "man" followed by a word indicating the action (e.g. takuni veseni "teacher", from lulusi veseni "to teach").

Demonyms are formed by the word marai preceding the place name (e.g. marai Judia "Jew"), in both singular and plural. The word pita ("female") precedes in the feminine (e.g. pita marai Sameria "woman of Samaria"). The word mera can also be used (e.g. mera 'Ibru "Hebrews").

In many cases, the noun is omitted and implied by context.

==== Pronouns ====
The following table contains Akei's personal pronouns.

Pronouns	Singular	Plural	
1st	inau (I)	Inclusive	inika (we, when including the addressee)
1st	inau (I)	Exclusive	komam (we, when excluding the addressee)
2nd	iniko (singular 'you')	komim (plural 'you')	
3rd	inia (he/she/it)	inira (they)	

Akei has a clusivity distinction: a grammatical difference between inclusive and exclusive first person pronouns. The inclusive form is used when including the addressee, whereas the exclusive form excludes them.

There is a single demonstrative pronoun, nake, meaning "this" or "that". This may be preceded by the third person pronouns inia and inira to mark singularity or plurality: inia nake "this", "that"; inira nake "these", "those". The interrogative pronouns are isei "who?", sava "what?" and savai "what is?". Indefinite pronouns include te "any", tese'ese "anyone", mo'ese "one", vavono "other", te tuenira "some, others", povi "all, every", and inira povi "everyone".

The reflexive or intensive pronoun is 'ase "self, by one's self, alone" followed by a suffixed possessive pronoun (e.g. ra te 'asera varaira "they told one another", inia 'asena "he was alone"). Tambu is also used (e.g. matai savai komi tambumim rereni komim? "why do you look at one another?"). See the following table:

Reflexive or intensive pronouns	Singular	Plural	
1st	'aseku	Inclusive	—
1st	'aseku	Exclusive	'asemam
2nd	'asem	'asemim	
3rd	'asena	'asera	

There are shortened forms of the subject and object pronouns, used either as an affix or as separate words.

Short subject pronouns	Singular	Plural	
1st	na	Inclusive	ka
1st	na	Exclusive	koma
2nd	ko	komi	
3rd	i	ra	

Short object pronouns	Singular	Plural	
1st	au	Inclusive	ka
1st	au	Exclusive	—
2nd	ko	—	
3rd	a	ra	

There is no shortened form of the second person plural and first person exclusive plural object pronouns; the full pronoun is used instead (e.g. ka'ika "ask us", but ka'i komim "ask you").

==== Possession ====
A noun in the genitive case follows the head noun (i.e. the possessor follows the possessed, e.g. vivi ai "river's bank", literally "bank river").

In regard to possession, there are essentially two classes of noun. Head nouns of the first class are suffixed with -ni if the genitive noun is also of the first class (e.g. 'esani pita "name of the woman"). First class nouns suffix the pronoun to show possession (e.g. natuku "my son"), including when the noun is used as a preposition.

If the genitive noun is of the second class, the head noun is suffixed with -i (e.g. venatui takuni "daughter of a man"). Connecting a second class head noun and its genitive are the particles no for general possession, 'a for food and drink, and pula for property generally. No is suffixed -ni and is placed in between the head and its genitive (e.g. tetei noni takuni "badness of man").

The pronoun is suffixed to these particles, and precedes the noun (e.g. noku tano "my land"). See the following table with no as the example:

Possessive suffixes	Singular	Plural	
1st	noku	Inclusive	noka
1st	noku	Exclusive	nomam
2nd	nomu, nom	nomim	
3rd	nona	nora	

The possessive pronouns pulaku, pulam, and pulana correspond to the English "mine", "thine", "his", etc; they are used without a noun (e.g. noku lulusi veseni mo kei pulaku, pulana te tapatapaau "my teaching is not mine, (but) his that sent me".

The preposition isi "with" is used with a suffixed pronoun as a possessive (e.g. pita isim "your wife", literally "woman with you").

=== Verbs ===
A noun may be used as a verb (e.g. usa te le'e na tano "rain stayed on the earth", na pai veia i pai usa na tano "I will make it, it will rain on the earth"), although the verb may also be entirely different from the noun (e.g. valum "to fight", takuni vuro "fighter, soldier"). Verbs may be transitive or intransitive; in the former case, the object pronoun is suffixed.

Akei has a zero copula; the predicate simply follows the subject (e.g. inia se'ena "it (was) so", inau Pero "I (am) Pharaoh"). Negation is shown by the particle kei, which follows the tense particles (e.g. nam kei pinisia "I do not know him").

Causativity is indicated with the verb vei "to do, to make" in a separate phrase (e.g. na pai veia i pai le turi "I will make him he shall again stand", i.e. "I will raise him up").

Passivity is indicated with a third person plural pronoun in the active (e.g. noku mani ra te le tia "my money is restored", literally "my money they give back"). The subject is sometimes omitted (e.g. te ulia "(it) was written").

The verb pinisi "to know", and its negative equivalent kei pinisi indicate ability or inability and precede the main verb (e.g. isei mo pinisi ronoa "who can hear it?").

The interrogative mood is identical to that of the indicative, unless an interrogative adverb or pronoun is used (e.g. komi pai 'ilu se'era? "will you go away also?").

The imperative mood is expressed with the second person present pronouns (e.g. kom turi! "stand up!"), and similarly with the hortative in the other persons (e.g. kam vano se'ena! "let us go likewise!"). The prohibitive (negative imperative) and dehortative (negative hortative) moods are expressed with takai, which can be used with or without the particle and pronouns (e.g. takai 'oroau! "don't hinder me!"). The verb 'are "to allow" expresses permission (e.g. kom 'areau na pai masa'a! "let me go up!", literally "allow me I will go up").

To express the subjunctive, one sentence simply follows the other (e.g. nam vano na pai 'izia "I go (that) I may (shall) awake him"), and likewise with the conditional (e.g. inia mo noro, i pai le vure'a "(if) he sleep, he will again (be) well"). Alternatively, for the subjunctive, the noun mata with a pronominal suffix is added to the end of the sentence (e.g. na te mai, ra pai vatia mauri matana "I am come, that they may have life").

The particle le, following the tense particle, indicates repetition of an action (e.g. te le mai "he came again"), and misi indicates continuance (e.g. mo misi mauri "he is still alive").

==== Tense ====
The particle mo indicates the present tense. It is abbreviated to -m suffixed to the shortened form of the subject pronoun, except for the third person singular, where the particle is used on its own (e.g. mo rere "he sees", but kom ulenia "you say it").

Present tense pronouns	Singular	Plural	
1st	nam	Inclusive	kam
1st	nam	Exclusive	komam
2nd	kom	komim	
3rd	mo	ram	

The particle te indicates the past tense, following the shortened form of the subject pronoun. However, like the present tense, the particle is used without the preceding pronoun for the third person singular (e.g. te lesira "he saw them", but na te 'ania "I did eat it").

Past tense pronouns	Singular	Plural	
1st	na te	Inclusive	ka te
1st	na te	Exclusive	koma te
2nd	ko te	komi te	
3rd	te	ra te	

The future tense is indicated by pai following the shortened form of the subject pronoun. Note the third person singular i is used before pai, in contrast to the other tenses (e.g. i pai vatia mauri 'inia "he shall have life through it", na pai varai komim "I shall tell you").

Past tense pronouns	Singular	Plural	
1st	na pai	Inclusive	ka pai
1st	na pai	Exclusive	koma pai
2nd	ko pai	komi pai	
3rd	i pai	ra pai	

=== Adjectives ===
Adjectives can be a single morpheme, a compound (e.g. takuni epevuluvulura'a "hairy man", from epe "body" and vulu "hair") or prefixed with ma- (e.g. malum "soft"). A noun or verb may be used as an adjective without change to its form (e.g. uro ai "water pot" from ai "water"). Adjectives follow their noun (e.g. tahuni vure 'a "good man", literally "man good").

Comparatives are formed using statements (e.g. tu'u vavono mo vitinana 'inia tu'u nake "other things greater than these", literally "thing other is great by it thing this"). The word nasa "only" denotes a superlative (e.g. inau volim mo vitinana nasa "thy reward great exceedingly").

=== Adverbs ===
The verbs masa'a "to go up", masivo "to go down", mai "to come", vano "to go", rovo'i "to flee", when used with other verbs, become adverbs meaning "up, down, hither, hence, away". Masa'a and masivo lose their prefix ma- (e.g. tia sa'a "to lift up", reresa'a "to look up", kom tia nom uro sivo "let down your pitcher").

Interrogative adverbs include na nisa? "when? (past)", nisa? "when? (future)", matai sava? "why?" (literally "cause of what?") (e.g. na nisa ko te mai kiae? "when did you come here?", komim ronoa matai sava? "why do you hear him?").

Other adverbs include ereri'i "now", na 'aireni "today", na poni alo "yesterday", na malana "tomorrow", na mataravi nake "tonight", na pon "last night", na uluirani "in the morning", na mataravi "in the evening", mo poriri'i "when it was dark", na poni naki "at that time, then", vila "quickly", na nosa "at first", na muri "before", va 'ese "immediately", na poni povi "at all times, always", kiae "here", ae "there", kikue "yonder", ravi "near" (with a suffixed pronoun, e.g. Jekob te vano ravini Aisak "Jacob went near Isaac"), zaravono "afar", se'ena "thus, so, as" (e.g. na pai se'emim "I shall be like you", se'e literally "like",), matana tu'u nake "therefore" (literally "because of thing that", e.g. matana tu'u nake nam tapara nasa "therefore I rejoice greatly", nasa "very, exceedingly".

=== Prepositions ===
The locative preposition is na (e.g. na sala "on the road", na ima "in the house"). It is also used referring to motion to or from a place, except with proper nouns (e.g. ra pai tara'i na zara nake "they go away from (at) this place", but te tara'i Ijipt "he came (from) Egypt"). Na can also be used as an instrumental (e.g. te jina rorona na sari "he pierced his side with a spear").

'ini means "about, concerning" and is used with the object pronouns (e.g. na te ronoa lulusi 'iniko "I have heard it said about thee"). 'Ini becomes instrumental at the end of a verbal phrase (e.g. varea nake nam tovoko 'inia "I give thee this field", literally "field this I give thee with it"). Isi means "to, with, from a person" (e.g. te mai isina "it came to him").

Many prepositions come from nouns; in these cases they are used with the possessive suffixes and the locative na. Some examples are 'ere "before" (e.g. na 'ereku "before me", 'ere literally "face"), 'e'e "beside", valibu "the middle", vava "under", koko "under", lolo "inside", valu "outside", and zeni "stead" (e.g. zenin Ebel "instead of Abel"). Other prepositions are verbal; some examples are ta'u "after" (e.g. ra pai ta'uia "they shall come after him", ta'u literally "to follow") and kalili "round about". Ta'u may also be equivalent to the English "with" (e.g. te kei tapatapai ta'ura to'ana "he did not send him with his brothers").

=== Conjunctions ===
The word mata with suffixes (e.g mataku) means "because". The verb mai "to come" means "until". The word kuain at the beginning of a sentence indicates doubt or hesitation. Akei lacks copulative, disjunctive, conditional or illative conjunctions.

== Numbers ==
Akei uses a quinary numeral system, with a distinct word for ten. The numbers are treated as verbs and prefixed with the particle mo, and, for the numbers six to nine, a second particle 'a is added. The particle ravu is also used for some numbers. When a cardinal numeral refers to a person, it is preceded by pen or peni (e.g. natuna peni sanavulu komana mo'ese "his twelve sons").

Akei	English
mo 'ese	one
mo rua	two
mo tolu	three
mo vati	four
mo lima	five
mo 'a'ese	six
mo ravu 'arua	seven
mo ravu 'atolu	eight
mo ravu 'a vati	nine
mo sanavulu	ten
mo sanavulu komana mo 'ese	eleven
mo sanavulu komana mo rua	twelve
mo navulurua	twenty
mo navulutolu	thirty
napsanavulu	hundred
mo napsanavulu mo va'arua	two hundred
mo napsanavulu mo va'asanavulu	thousand

Instead of sanavulu, navulu with a number affixed refers to twenty, thirty and so on (e.g. mo navulurua "twenty", mo navulutolu "thirty"). The multiplicative va'a is used for the hundreds above the first (e.g. mo napsanavulu mo va'arua "two hundred", mo napsanavula mo va'avati "four hundred"). Thousands above the first also use a multiplicative (e.g. mo vanavunavu va'a lima "five thousand").

Turumuri means "first", whereas other ordinals are formed by the suffix -na (e.g. mo ruana "second"). In compounds, this suffix is added to the other components as well as to the noun (e.g. na taunina mo sanavuluna koma toluna "in the thirteenth year"). Before a noun, -na changes to -i and is accompanied by the particle 'a (e.g. 'a'esai natuna "sixth son").

Multiplicatives are formed by prefixing va'a-, except for the number one which uses va'- (e.g. va'ese "once", va'arua "twice", va'atolu "thrice", va'asanavulu "ten times"). Distributives are formed by reduplication (e.g. rua-rua "by twos").

== Selected vocabulary ==
The list below is a selected sample of words in Akei.

Akei	English
maci	fish
biriu	dog
utu	louse
laiau	tree
rauna	leaf
benubenu	skin
kae	blood
sui	bone
kalina	ear
mata	eye
lanisu	nose
ako	tooth
meme	tongue
pau	knee
lima	hand
susu	breast
mape	liver
unu	drink
talesia	see
ronoa	hear
mate	die
mae	come
mata alo	sun
macoe	star
wae	water
sule	stone
apu	fire
sala	path
patibuti	mountain
poni	night
abuni	new
isa	name
io	yes
akei	no

== Sample text ==
Genesis 1.1-5 in Akei:

1. Na muri God te veia tuka, tano.
2. Tano tele'e ozo tanopilo; pon tumbumalate te le'e na bua'a: talumen God te Vovi na ului ai.
3. Talena God, I pai mamara: te mamara.
4. God te lesia mamara, inia mo vure'a: God te sinkalai mamara, koko'a.
5. Mamara God te tia 'esana rani, koko'a te tia 'esana poni. Mataravi uluirani, pon mo 'ese.
6. Talena God, Zara vitinana i pai le'e na valibu'ira ai, i pai sinkalara ai.
7. God te veia zara vitinana, te sinkalara ai ram le'e atano 'inia zara vitinana, ram le 'e na uluna: inia se'ena.
8. Zara vitinana God te tia 'esana tuka. Mataravi uluirani, pon ruana.

Genesis 1.1-5 in English:

1. In the beginning God created the heaven and the earth.
2. And the earth was without form, and void; and darkness was upon the face of the deep. And the Spirit of God moved upon the face of the waters.
3. And God said, Let there be light: and there was light.
4. And God saw the light, that it was good: and God divided the light from the darkness.
5. And God called the light Day, and the darkness he called Night. And the evening and the morning were the first day.
6. And God said, Let there be a firmament in the midst of the waters, and let it divide the waters from the waters.
7. And God made the firmament, and divided the waters which were under the firmament from the waters which were above the firmament: and it was so.
8. And God called the firmament Heaven. And the evening and the morning were the second day.
