= Mores language =

Austronesian language spoken in Vanuatu

Mores
- Ko, Farmores
- Native to: Vanuatu
- Region: Espiritu Santo
- Native speakers: 150
- Language family: Austronesian: Malayo-Polynesian; Oceanic; Southern Oceanic; North-Central Vanuatu; North Vanuatu; Espiritu Santo; Mores

Language codes
- ISO 639-3: –
- Glottolog: rori1237 (with Toksiki)
- ELP: Mores
- Mores is classified as Severely Endangered by the UNESCO Atlas of the World's Languages in Danger.

Mores (alternatively Ko or Farmores) is an Oceanic language spoken in central Espiritu Santo Island in Vanuatu.
