= Ngen language =

Language of the East Santo languages originating on Espiritu Santo, Vanuatu

Ngen
- Shark Bay
- Native to: Vanuatu
- Region: Litaro (Pilot) Island, Shark Bay coast
- Ethnicity: 1,100 ethnic population
- Native speakers: (450 cited 2001)
- Language family: Austronesian: Malayo-Polynesian; Oceanic; Southern Oceanic; North-Central Vanuatu; North Vanuatu; Espiritu Santo; Ngen

Language codes
- ISO 639-3: ssv
- Glottolog: shar1244
- ELP: Ngen
- Ngen is classified as Vulnerable by the UNESCO Atlas of the World's Languages in Danger.

Ngen, or Shark Bay, is one of the East Santo languages group of languages. It is spoken on Espiritu Santo in Vanuatu. It has about 450 speakers. It is close geographically and linguistically to the now dormant Lorediakarkar.
