= Ande language =

Oceanic language spoken in Vanuatu

Ande
- Morouas
- Native to: Vanuatu
- Region: Espiritu Santo
- Native speakers: 500
- Language family: Austronesian: Malayo-Polynesian; Oceanic; Southern Oceanic; North-Central Vanuatu; North Vanuatu; Espiritu Santo; Ande

Language codes
- ISO 639-3: mrp
- Glottolog: moro1286
- ELP: Ande
- Ande is not endangered according to the classification system of the UNESCO Atlas of the World's Languages in Danger

Ande or Morouas (Moruas) is an Oceanic language spoken in central Espiritu Santo Island in Vanuatu.
