= Tamambo language =

Austronesian language spoken in Vanuatu

Tamambo
- Malo
- Native to: Vanuatu
- Region: Malo, Espiritu Santo
- Native speakers: (4,000 cited 2001)
- Language family: Austronesian: Malayo-Polynesian; Oceanic; Southern Oceanic; North-Central Vanuatu; North Vanuatu; Espiritu Santo; Tamambo

Language codes
- ISO 639-3: mla Malo
- Glottolog: malo1243
- ELP: Tamambo
- Tamambo is not endangered according to the classification system of the UNESCO Atlas of the World's Languages in Danger.

Tamambo, or Malo, is an Oceanic language spoken by 4,000 people on Malo and nearby islands in Vanuatu. It is one of the most conservative Southern Oceanic languages.

== Name ==
The word Tamambo is the native name of the island of Malo, as pronounced in the western dialect.

In the eastern dialect, the island's name is Tamapo. The same form Tamapo is also used as the name of that eastern dialect of the Tamambo language, now almost extinct. Of the same origin is the word R̄am̈apo, which is the name of Malo in the neighboring Araki language.

== Phonology ==
=== Vowels ===
Tamambo vowel chart, from Riehl & Jauncey (2005:257)

	Front	Back
Close	i	u
Mid	e	o
Open	a	

/i u/ become [j w] respectively when unstressed and before another vowel. /o/ may also become [w] for some speakers.

=== Consonants ===
Tamambo consonant phonemes
		Bilabial		Alveolar	Post- alveolar	Velar
		plain	labial	Alveolar	Post- alveolar	Velar
Nasal		m	mʷ	n		ŋ
Plosive	oral			t		k
Plosive	prenasal	ᵐb	ᵐbʷ	ⁿd	ᶮɟ	
Fricative		β	βʷ	s		x
Approximant				l		
Trill				r		

- /ᶮɟ/ is often affricated and devoiced [ᶮtʃ].
- Younger speakers often realize /β/ as [f] initially and [v] medially, while /βʷ/ is often replaced by [w].
- /x/ is usually realized as [x] initially, but some speakers use [h]. Medially, it may be pronounced as any of [x ɣ h ɦ ɡ].

Most syllables are of the form CV; closed syllables usually end in a nasal and can also optionally occur in reduplication.

== Writing system ==
Few speakers of Tamambo are literate, and there is no standard orthography. Spelling conventions used include:

Phoneme	Representation
/ᵐb/	⟨b⟩ initially, ⟨mb⟩ medially
/ᵐbʷ/	⟨bu⟩ or ⟨bw⟩ initially, ⟨mbu⟩ or ⟨mbw⟩ medially
/x/	⟨c⟩ or ⟨h⟩
/ⁿd/	⟨d⟩ initially, ⟨nd⟩ medially
/ᶮɟ/	⟨j⟩ initially, ⟨nj⟩ medially
/k/	⟨k⟩
/l/	⟨l⟩
/m/	⟨m⟩
/mʷ/	⟨mu⟩ or ⟨mw⟩
/n/	⟨n⟩
/ŋ/	⟨ng⟩
/r/	⟨r⟩
/s/	⟨s⟩
/t/	⟨t⟩
/β/	⟨v⟩
/βʷ/	⟨vu⟩ or ⟨w⟩

== Pronouns and person markers ==
In Tamambo, personal pronouns distinguish between first, second, and third person. There is an inclusive and exclusive marking on the first-person plural and gender is not marked. There are four classes of pronouns, which is not uncommon in other Austronesian languages:

- Independent pronouns
- Subject pronouns
- Object pronouns
- Possessive pronouns.

Pronominal paradigm
			Independent pronouns	Subject pronouns	Object pronouns	Possessive pronouns
1st person	singular		iau	ku	-(i)au	-ku
1st person	plural	inclusive	hinda	ka	-nda	-nda
1st person	plural	exclusive	kamam	ka	kamam	-mam
2nd person	singular		niho	o	-ho	-m
2nd person	plural		kamim	no	kamim	-mim
3rd person	singular		nia	mo (realis) / a (irrealis)	-a / -e	-na
3rd person	plural		nira	na	-ra	-ra

=== Independent pronouns ===
Independent pronouns behave grammatically similarly to other NPs in that they can occur in the same slot as a subject NP, functioning as the head of a NP. However, in regular discourse, they are not used a great deal due to the obligatory nature of cross-referencing subject pronouns. Use of independent pronouns is often seen as unnecessary and unusual except in the following situations:

- Indicate person and number of conjoint NP
- Introduce new referent
- Reintroduce referent
- Emphasise participation of known referent

==== Indicating person and number of conjoint NP ====
In the instance where two NPs are joined as a single subject, the independent pronoun reflects the number of the conjoint NP:

Ku vano.
1SG go
'I went.'

and

Nancy mo vano.
Nancy 3SG go
'Nancy went.'

Thus, merging the two above clauses into one, the independent pronoun must change to reflect total number of subjects:

Kamam mai Nancy ka vano.
1PL.EX PREP Nancy 1PL go
'Nancy and I went.'

==== Introducing a new referent ====
When a new referent is introduced into the discourse, the independent pronoun is used. In this case, kamam:

Ne kamam mwende talom, kamam ka-le loli na hinau niaro.
But 1PL.EX particular.one first 1PL.EX 1PL-TA do ART thing EMPH
'But we who came first, [well] as for us, we do this very thing'

==== Reintroduction of referent ====
In this example, the IP hinda in the second sentence is used to refer back to tahasi in the first sentence.

Ka tau tahasi mo sahe, le hani. Hani hinda ka-le biri~mbiri.
1PL put.in.place stone 3SG go.up TA burn burn 1PL.IN 1PL-TA REDUP~grate
'We put the stones up (on the fire) and it's burning. While it's burning we do the grating [of the yams].'

==== Emphasis on participation of known subject ====
According to Jauncey, this is the most common use of the IP. Comparing the two examples, the latter placing the emphasis on the subject:

O vano?
2SG go
'Are you going?'

and

Niho o vano?
2SG 2SG go
'Are you going?'

=== Subject pronouns ===
Subject pronouns are an obligatory component of a verbal phrase, indicating the person and number of the NP. They can either co-occur with the NP or independent in the subject slot, or exist without if the subject has been deleted through ellipsis or previously known context.

Balosuro mo-te' sohena.
nowadays 3SG-NEG the.same
'It's not like that nowadays.'

=== Object pronouns ===
Object pronouns are very similar looking to independent pronouns, appearing to be abbreviations of the independent pronoun as seen in the pronoun paradigm above. Object pronouns behave similarly to the object NP, occurring in the same syntactic slot, however only one or the other is used, both cannot be used simultaneously as an object argument – which is unusual in Oceanic languages as many languages have obligatory object pronominal cross-referencing on the verb agreeing with NP object.

Mo iso ka turu ka vosai-a
3SG finish 1PL stand 1PL cook.in.stones-OBJ:3SG
'Then we bake it in the stones.'

=== Possessive pronouns ===
Possessive pronouns substitute for NP possessor, suffixing to the possessed noun in direct possessive constructions or to one the four possessive classifiers in indirect constructions.

==== Direct possession ====
Tama-k mo vora bosinjivo.
Father-POSS:1SG 3SG be.born {bosinjivo area}
'My father was born in the Bisinjivo area.'

==== Indirect possession ====
ma-m ti
CLF-POSS:2SG tea
'your tea'

== Negation ==
Negation in Tamambo involves the use of a negative particle; negative verb and negative aspectuals (semantics of time) to change positive constructions into negative ones.

=== Negation and the VP ===
The negative particle -te and negative aspectual tele 'not yet' and lete 'never' can appear in the same slot of the Verb Phrase, illustrated below:

Obligatory (bolded) and optional components of a VP in Tamambo
1 **Subject Pronoun**	2 Modality markers of Realis mo FUT -mbo	3 Aspectual ta	4 Aspectuals le male Negative -te Negative Aspectuals tele lete	5 Manner modifiers	6 **Head**	7 Manner modifiers Directionals Non-resultative modifiers

Both the negative aspectuals appear to be derived from the tense-aspect marker le and the negative particle -te. All the optional modifiers in the VP are mutually exclusive thus; the negative morphemes allow no modifiers between them and the head of the VP.

=== Negative particle -te ===
The negative particle -te which expresses negative polarity on the verb is a bound morpheme, meaning it must be attached to the subject pronominal clitic. The negative particle also occurs immediately before the verb noted in example [105]. Furthermore, example [105] demonstrates what Jauncey terms a 'negative progressive'; a way of expressing the negative in the present tense such as 'he's not doing it' using the negative particle -te.

Mo-te loli-a
3SG-NEG do-OBJ:3SG
'He didn't do it'./ 'He's not doing it.' [105]

=== Negative aspectuals ===
The negative aspectuals are used to refer to different aspects of time. The aspectual lete 'never' is used to refer to event times that are prior to speech time noted in example [107] and [100].

Mo lete loli-a.
3SG never do-OBJ:3SG
'He's never done it.' [107]

Na lete skul.
3PL never school
'They never went to church.' [100]

The negative aspectual tele 'not yet' is used only where the events are referring to an event time prior to or simultaneous with speech time noted in example [106] and [103].

Mo tele loli-a.
3SG not.yet do-OBJ:3SG
'He's not yet done it'. [106]

Mo-iso na-le ovi, na-natu-ra na tele suiha...
3SG-finish 3PL-TA live PL-child-POSS:3PL 3PL not.yet strong
'So then they were living there, (but) their children were not yet strong...' [103]

=== Negation and modality ===
In Tamambo, modality can be expressed through the future marker –mbo and the two 3SG subject pronouns, mo (realis) and a (irrealis). In Tamambo realis is 'the grammatical or lexical marking of an event time or situation that has happened (or not) or is happening (or not) relative to speech time' and irrealis refers to 'the grammatical or lexical marking of an event time or situation that may have happened, or that may or may not happen in the future'. In Tamambo, the negative particle -te and aspectual lete can be used in conjunction with the 3SG irrealis a to express that a situation or action is not known to have happened. This is used because the negative markers cannot occur next to the future marker –mbo, however they can occur separately in the same construction evident in example [101] containing lete.

Mo matahu matan taura-na a-te mai.
3SG frightened SUB uncle-POSS:3SG 3SG-NEG come
'He is afraid that his uncle might not come.' [97]

Ne are sohen a lete lai na manji, a-mbo turu aie a hisi a mate...
but if like 3SG never take ART animal, 3SG-FUT stand there 3SG touch 3SG die
'But if it was such that he never caught any fish, he would stand there until he died...' [101]

In Tamambo, only the 3SG preverbal subject form has a irrealis, thus when -te is used with other preverbal subject pronouns, the time of event can be ambiguous, and phrases must be understood from context and other lexemes. For example, [98] illustrates the various interpretations one phrase may have.

Mo matahu matan bula-na dam na-te sula
3SG frightened SUB CLF-POSS:3SG yam 3PL-NEG grow
'S/he is/was afraid that her yams didn't grow/are not growing/won't grow/mightn't grow.' [98]

=== Negative verb tete ===
The negative verb tete is a part of Tamambo's closed subset of intransitive verbs, meaning that it has grammatical limitations. For example, the verb tete can only be used in conjunction with the 3SG preverbal subject pronominal clitic. The negative verb tete can function with a valency of zero or one. Valency refers to the number of syntactic arguments a verb can have.

==== Zero Valency ====
The most common use of the verb tete is illustrated in example [59], where the verb has zero valency.

Mo tete.
3SG negative
'No.' [59]

The 3SG pronoun's of a (irrealis) and mo (realis) are used in conjunction with tete to respond to varying questions depending on whether the answer is certain or not. Example [60] illustrates the use of a and tete in a construction to answer a question where the answer is not certain.

A kiri? A tete.
3SG.IRR rain 3SG.IRR negative
'Will it/might it rain?' [60] 'No.' [60]

However, if the answer is certain than mo and tete are used highlighted in example [61].

O-mbo vano ana maket avuho? Mo tete.
2SG.FUT go PREP market tomorrow 3SG negative
'Are you going to the market tomorrow?' [61] 'No.' [61]

==== Valency of one ====
If tete functions with a valency of one, then the intransitive subject must precede the verb similar to a prototypical verb phrase. In this situation, 3SG marking can only represent both the singular and plural, highlighted in example [65].

Tuai, bisuroi mo tete.
long.ago bisuroi.yam 3SG negative
'Long ago, there were no bisuroi yams.' [65]

Tete can also function with an 'existential meaning' illustrated in example [62], to express there was 'no one/no people'.

Tuai, Natamabo, mo tete tamalohi...
long.ago Malo 3SG negative person
'Long ago, on Malo, there were no people...' [62]

==== Ambient serial verb constructions ====
The negative verb tete can also be used following a verb in an ambient serial verb construction. In Tamambo, a serial verb construction is defined by Jauncey as 'a sequence of two or more verbs that combine to function as a single predicate'. Furthermore, the term ambient in this verb construction refers to the phenomena when a verb, which follows a transitive or intransitive verb, makes a predication concerning the previous event rather than the participant. When the negative tete verb is used in an ambient serial verb construction, tete makes a negative predication regarding the event expressed by the previous verb highlighted in example [64] and [65]. Furthermore, in this instance it is ungrammatical to insert other words between the negative verb and the previous verb.

Tama-na mo viti-a mo re "Tamalohi na dami-h mo tete"
Father-POSS:3SG 3SG speak-OBJ:3SG 3SG say person 3PL ask-OBJ:2SG 3SG negative
'Her father spoke to her and said "Men ask for you to no avail." [64]

...ka-te soari-a, ka sai-a mo tete
1PL-NEG see-OBJ:3SG 1PL search-OBJ:3SG 3SG negative
'...we didn't see it, we looked for it (but) there was nothing.' [65]

=== Negation and realis conditional sentences ===
Negative realis conditional sentences express an idea that something will happen if the condition is not met, such as an imperative or warning. The sentence outlines the conditions, and includes an 'otherwise' or 'if not' component. The condition and the 'if not' (bolded) component occur together before the main clause illustrated in example [124].

Balosuro ku vuro-ho hina hamba-ku niani o laia-a, ro o lai-a ale a-tete-ro o mate!
present.time 1SG fight-OBJ:2SG PREP wing-POSS:1SG this 2SG take-OBJ:3SG thus 2SG take-OBJ:3SG if 3SG-negative-thus 2SG die
'(So) now I'm going to fight you with these wings of mine and you defend yourself, so you defend yourself and if not then you're dead!' [124]

== Demonstratives ==
Tamambo distinguishes between demonstrative pronouns, demonstrative adverbs and demonstrative modifiers.

=== Demonstrative pronouns ===
Demonstrative pronouns occur in core argument slots, where they occur next to the predicate, can be relativised and can be fronted. These features distinguish them from demonstrative modifiers and demonstrative adverbs which may take the same form. Demonstrative pronouns in Tamambo include pronouns used for spatial deixis, anaphoric reference and emphatic reference. They do not change when referring to animate or inanimate entities.

==== Spatial deictics ====
Demonstrative pronouns are organised into a two-way framework, which is based on the distance relative to the speaker and the addressee. While it is common for Oceanic languages to have a distinction based on distance from the speaker, the two-way organisation is unusual for Oceanic languages, where demonstratives usually have a three-way distinction. These pronouns refer to entities which both the speaker and the addressee can see.

===== niani =====
The pronoun niani 'this one' refers to an entity which is near the speaker.

Niani mo boni.
this 3SG stink
This one stinks.

===== niala =====
The pronoun niala 'that one over there' refers to an entity that is further away from both the speaker and the addressee.

Niala mo tawera tina
that 3SG big really
That one is really big.

Nirala, which translates to 'those ones over there', is used in colloquial speech as a plural form of niala .

==== Anaphoric reference ====
Tamambo, like many other Oceanic languages and possibly Proto-Oceanic, includes a demonstrative system which functions to reference previous discourse. Tamambo includes two pronouns used for anaphora, mwende and mwe, which are only used for anaphora without any marking for person or distance, a common feature of Oceanic languages.

===== mwende =====
The pronoun mwende 'the particular one, the particular ones' can function as either a proform or a noun phrase. As shown in example (3) below, mwende is used for a singular noun, specifying which particular knife is the better one, whereas in example (4), the same pronoun, mwende, is referring to multiple 'ones'.

Simba niala mo duhu mo liu mwende niani.
knife that 3SG good 3SG exceed particular.one this
That knife is better than this one.

Mo sahe, mwende na-le turu aulu na revei-a
3SG go.up particular.one 3PL-TA stand up.direction 3PL drag-OBJ:SG
He went up (first) and the ones standing up on top dragged her up.

==== Emphatic reference ====
Tamambo includes the demonstrative pronoun, niaro, used for emphasis, as shown in example (5).

Niaro evui-na-i no-ku stori
EMPH end-NMZ-LINK CLF-POSS:1SG story
That's it the end of my story.

=== Demonstrative adverbs ===
==== Spatial modifiers ====
Spatial modifier adverbs in Tamambo are sentential, and cannot occur within the proposition. There are three sets of spatial modifiers, which are shown in the table below. These three sets of spatial modifiers can be organised into three groups depending on the distance from the speaker, a trait common to demonstratives in Oceanic languages. The following table shows the three sets of spatial modifiers in Tamambo. In this arrangement by Kaufman, the formatives -ni, -e, and -la can be seen to correlate with distance from the speaker.

Spatial/Directional modifiers
	Speaker proximate	Hearer proximate	Distal
Set A	aie-n(i)	ai-e	
Set B	ro-ni		ro-la
Set C	nia-ni	nia-e	nia-la

===== aien and aie =====
These adverbs begin with ai-, which suggests that they are related to a locative proform in Proto-Oceanic, *ai-. Aien can mean either 'in this place', referring to a location, as shown in example (6), or used for anaphoric reference, where it can mean 'at this stage of events', as shown in example (7). Aien refers to location in place or time more generally than another spatial modifier, roni.

Ro store nia a turu tau aien.
thus story 3SG 3SG stand put here
So the story is to stop here.

Mo tete tamalohi a ovi aien.
3SG NEG person 3SG live here
There was not a person living here.

Aie refers to 'another place which is not visible', or may be used for a place which has already been introduced earlier in conversation, as shown in example (8).

Mo ovi aie tovon nia 'student'.
3SG live there when 3SG student.
She lived there when she was a student.

===== roni and rola =====
Roni is used to refer to a place visible to both the speaker and the listener, and is more specific than aien. It translates to 'right here close to me'.

O mai roni!
2SG come here
Come here!

Rola is an old word for 'there' which is rarely used, and is said to have come from the east. In her research, Jauncey reports no examples of rola being used in narrative or conversation but provides the example below.

Ku vano rola.
1SG go there
I went there.

===== niani, niae and niala =====
These adverbs share the same forms as demonstrative pronouns and modifiers, but they occur at different parts of the sentence and perform different functions. These adverbs refer to places which are visible and in addition, the speaker will point. Niala and niani are not used for anaphoric reference. The nia- component of this set of demonstratives suggests a relationship to the Proto-Austronesian proximate demonstrative, which contains *ni. In addition, the pointing gesture which commonly accompanies the adverbs niani, niae and niala can be derived from the demonstrative function of the Proto-Austronesian component *ni.

Niani translates to 'here', where the referenced entity is close to the speaker, as shown in example (11).

O mai ka eno niani ka tivovo
2SG come 1PL lie here 1PL cover.over
Come and we'll lie here and cover ourselves...

Niae translates to 'there near you', where the referenced entity is close to the addressee, shown in example (12) below.

O sava-hi o mai niae?
2SG what-TR 2SG come there
How did you manage to get there?

Niala translates as 'there' or 'over there', and refers to a place that can be seen or a close place that cannot be seen.

...mwera atea le ovi aulu niala le loli-a sohena.
male one TA live up.direction there TA do-OBJ:3SG the.same
...a man living up over there (pointing) does it the same way.

=== Demonstrative modifiers ===
Demonstrative modifiers are a non-obligatory component of the noun phrase in Tamambo. In Tamambo, demonstrative modifiers function within the noun phrase, after the head noun to modify it. In languages spoken in Vanuatu, and Oceanic languages more generally, the demonstrative commonly follows the head noun. In Proto-Oceanic, this also seems to be the case for adnominal demonstratives. Demonstrative modifiers in Tamambo include spatial reference, anaphoric reference and emphatic reference uses.

==== Spatial reference ====
These demonstratives have a three-way distinction, based on distance relative to the speaker. They can occur following the head directly, as shown in example (14), or follow a descriptive adjective, as shown in example (15). The same forms are used as demonstrative pronouns, however niae is not used as a pronoun. The modifiers are the same for singular and plural nouns.

===== niani =====
Niani translates to 'this' or 'these' and references something close to the speaker.

O boi mwende niani tene mo tete?
2SG want particular.one this or 3SG NEG
Do you want this one or not?

In example (14), niani is modifying mwende, the demonstrative pronoun, which is the head.

Ka mai ana jara tawea niani
1PL come PREP place big this...
We came to this big place...

In this example, the demonstrative modifier niani follows directly after the descriptive adjective tawera, which in turn follows the head noun jara.

===== niae =====
Niae refers to something that is close to the addressee, and translates to 'that' or 'those'.

Hinau niae o lai-a ambea?
thing that 3SG take-OBJ:SG where
Where did you get that thing?

In example (16), the demonstrative modifier niani directly follows the after the noun samburu.

===== niala =====
Niala references something that is distant from both the speaker and the addressee.

Tamalohi niala nia tamalohi dandani.
person that 3SG person lie
That man is a liar.

In example (17), the demonstrative modifier niala follows directly after the first tamalohi, which is the person the speaker is referring to.

==== Anaphoric referential markers ====
Tamambo includes two anaphoric referential modifiers, rindi and mwende. Both are used posthead.

===== rindi =====
Rindi indicates a noun phrase which has been already introduced in either a preceding clause or earlier string of narrative or conversation, and limits the reference of an entity that has already been introduced.

In example (18), vavine has already been introduced at an earlier stage of the conversation, therefore rindi is used directly following the noun vavine when it is reintroduced.

...vavine rindi mo-te boi-a.
woman REF 3SG-NEG like-OBJ:3SG
...the woman didn't like him.

===== mwende =====
Mwende is more specific than rindi and indicates a referent which is definitely known.

Na-re "Motete, tamalohi mwende mo-ta mai
3PL-say no person particular.one 3SG-REP come
They said, "No that particular person hasn't come again."

The demonstrative modifier mwende follows the tamalohi, the noun.

==== Emphatic reference modifier ====
Niaro is the only emphatic reference modifier, which can also only occur posthead as shown in example (20).

...vevesai mara-maranjea nira na rongovosai na kastom niaro
every REDUP-old.man 3PL 3PL know ART custom EMPH
...all of the old men know about this very custom.

Niaro can occur with the anaphoric referential modifier rindi, and in that circumstance, rindi is shortened to ri, as shown in example (21) below. Both modifiers follow after the noun Kastom, with the anaphoric reference marker preceding the emphatic reference modifier.

Ro Kastom ri niaro nia mo tahunju tuai...
thus custom REF EMPH 3SG 3SG start of.old
So that particular custom, it started in olden times.

== Abbreviations ==
1,2,3	first, second, third person
ART	article
CLF	classifier
EMPH	emphatic
FUT	future
IRR	irrealis
LINK	possessive linker
NEG	negative particle
NMZ	nominalising affix
OBJ	object pronoun
POSS	possessive pronominal
PL	plural
PREP	preposition
REDUP	reduplicated
REF	prior reference made
REP	repeating action
SG	singular
SUB	subject
TA	tense-aspect marker
TR	transitivising suffix

== Bibliography ==
- Dryer, M. (2013). Feature 88A: Order of Demonstrative and Noun. Retrieved 28 March 2021, from https://wals.info/feature/88A#2/16.3/152.9
- Jauncey, Dorothy G. (1997). A Grammar of Tamambo, the Language of Western Malo, Vanuatu (PDF) (Ph.D. thesis). Australian National University. doi:10.25911/5D666220A63B3. hdl:1885/145981.
- Jauncey, Dorothy G. (2002). "Tamambo". In Lynch, J.; Ross, M.; Crowley, T. (eds.). The Oceanic Languages. Richmond, Surrey: Curzon. pp. 608–625.
- Jauncey, Dorothy G. (2011). Tamambo: the Language of Western Malo, Vanuatu (PDF). Pacific Linguistics 622. Canberra: Pacific Linguistics. hdl:1885/29991. ISBN 9780858836334.
- Kaufman, Daniel. (2013) "Tamambo, a Language of Malo, Vanuatu, by Dorothy G. Jauncey (Review)." Oceanic Linguistics, 52(1): 277–290. (read online)
- Riehl, Anastasia K.; Jauncey, Dorothy (2005). "Illustrations of the IPA: Tamambo". Journal of the International Phonetic Association. 35 (2): 255–259. doi:10.1017/S0025100305002197.
- Ross, Malcolm. (2004) Demonstratives, local nouns and directionals in Oceanic languages: a diachronic perspective, in Gunter Senft (ed.), Deixis and demonstratives in Oceanic Languages, Pacific Linguistics, Canberra, pp. 175–204
