= Tangoa language =

Austronesian language spoken in Vanuatu

Tangoa
- Movono
- Region: Tangoa Island, Vanuatu
- Native speakers: 370 (2015)
- Language family: Austronesian: Malayo-Polynesian; Oceanic; Southern Oceanic; North-Central Vanuatu; North Vanuatu; Espiritu Santo; Tangoa

Language codes
- ISO 639-3: tgp
- Glottolog: tang1347
- ELP: Tangoa
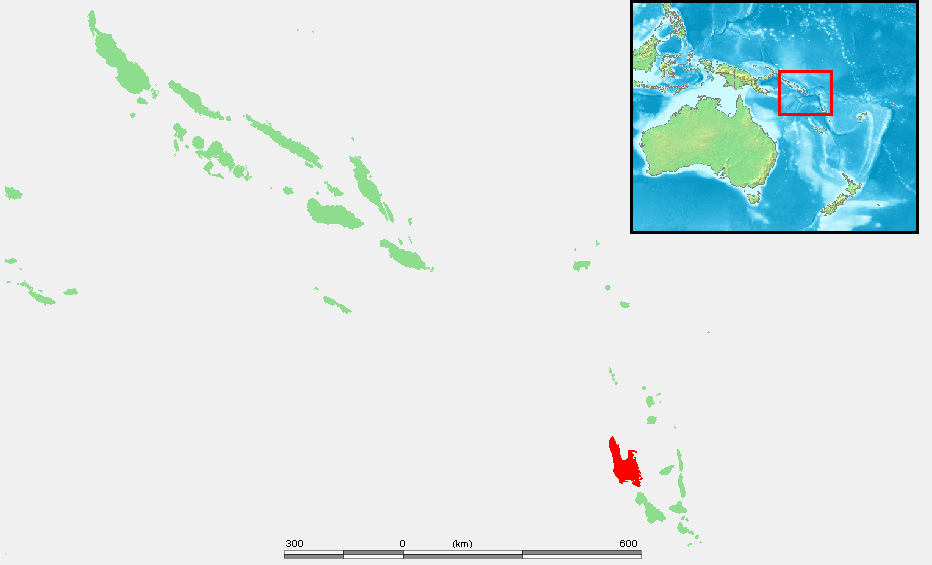
- Espiritu Santo; Tangoa Island, where Tangoa is primarily spoken, lies off the southern coast

- Tangoa is not endangered according to the classification system of the UNESCO Atlas of the World's Languages in Danger

Tangoa, or Movono, is an Oceanic language or dialect. It is spoken on Tangoa Island off the southern coast of Espiritu Santo in Vanuatu, as well as a few mainland villages opposite Tangoa. In 2015 it was estimated to have 370 speakers, while in 2001 it was estimated to have 800.

Tangoa may be endangered, with its status described as "shifting". Another source describes language use as vigorous, used among all ages in all domains, although with some code-switching to Bislama.

It has largely displaced the moribund Araki language spoken on Araki Island.

== Classification ==
Tangoa is generally described as a language, but also as a dialect of the proposed, lexicostastically defined Southwest Santo language along with Araki, Akei, and Wailapa.However, Tangoans generally do not understand Araki, which suggests they are not both dialects of a single language.

== History ==
The first Christian missionaries settled on Tangoa in 1887 and founded the Tangoa Training Institute (in the 1970s it became the Presbyterian Bible College and later the Talua Ministry Centre), with the aim of training Bible teachers and priests; it still has a large influence on social life in the area. Tangoa was chosen as a local lingua franca for missionary purposes; it was used in church, education and for inter-island communication.

It is suggested that the activities of the missionaries, especially the Bible translations into Tangoa, contributed to the decline of the Araki language, which is now moribund.

== Phonology ==
=== Consonants ===
The following table shows Tangoa's consonantal phonemes:

	Bilabial	Linguolabial	Alveolar	Retroflex	Velar
Nasal	m	n̼	n		ŋ
Plosive	p	t̼	t		k
Fricative	β	ð̼	s		x
Affricate			ts		
Liquid			l	ɽ, ɽr	

- /ts/ is a backed alveolar grooved affricate, and has a backed variant before back vowels.
- /s/ is a alveolar grooved fricative.
- /x/ can be, for some speakers, variously [x] and [ɣ] word-medially, occurring in free variation.

/m/, /n/ and /ŋ/ may be syllabic. They all may occur as syllables word-medially when preceding another consonant, and /m/ may occur as a syllable word-finally.

==== Linguolabials ====
Tangoa formerly had gendered sociolects, with linguolabial use differing between the sexes. Males acquired the women's dialect in early life from their caretakers, but lived in seclusion in all-male company during their initiation period, where they learned how to produce linguolabials. This, in effect reversed the historical collapse of *m and *mʷ. The awareness of the pre-merger distinction may have been supported by knowledge of surrounding languages in which the distinction is still preserved.

	'eye'	'snake'
Proto-Oceanic	*mata	*mʷata
Male speech	t̼ata	mata
General speech	mata	mata

In the 1950s, at least half of the adult speakers merged the linguolabials with the bilabials; minimal pairs became homophones. Confusion about where linguolabial use was appropriate only occurred in one minimal pair (pepe "butterfly" and pepe "flame"), but with more frequency among non-contrasting pairs, even among the older men. Most of the older Tangoan men regarded the merging as a recent deterioration in the language, caused by children not being taught to speak correctly. However, there is some evidence the variation was actually a long-standing feature. Usage of the linguolabials was considered prestigious, and many users of these phonemes were sensitive about any suggestion they misused them.

Research published in the 1970s stated that linguolabial phonemes defined the prestige variety. Used by males in oratory, serious discussion, traditional storytelling, etc, but less consistently in ordinary speech, it was generally accepted as "true Tangoa", although women and children were not expected to use them, and rarely did.

Research published in the 1980s stated that linguolabials were in the process of shifting to bilabials.

=== Vowels ===
The following table shows Tangoa's vowel phonemes:

	Front	Central	Back
High	i		u
Close-mid	e		o
Low		a	

The vowels weaken in unstressed syllables.

Ray (1926) gives the diphthongs as ai, ao, au, and oi, in both long and short form (although the phonetic values are unclear). However, later research found these to not be present, although "vowel clusters" do occur. All possible combinations of two vowels occur except /ie/ and /uo/. Out of the possible combinations of three vowels, /iau/, /iua/, /eia/, /eau/, /eua/, /aia/, /aui/, /aua/, /oia/, /oea/, /oau/, /uia/, /uea/ and /uai/ occur, and out of the possible combinations of four vowels, /iuau/, /eiau/, /euau/, /auau/, /aiau/, /oiau/, and /uaia/ occur.

=== Phoneme distribution ===
All phonemes can occur word-initially and word-medially (although there is a low incidence of vowel-initial words), but only vowels and the syllabic /m/ occur word-finally.

=== Stress ===
Stress is predictable; primary stress occurs on the penultimate syllable, and secondary stress, present in words of more than three syllables, occurs on the first syllable. Light stress occurs on the fourth syllable of seven syllable words, and on the fourth and sixth syllables of eight syllable words.

== Grammar ==
=== Nouns ===
A verb or adjective may be used as a noun without change to its form (e.g. la lo reti "they are speaking", noku reti "my speech"), although a verbal noun may be formed by the suffixes a or ia (e.g. mo rozo "he is sick", rozoa "sickness").

When prefixed to an adjective, the word cina (a shortening of cinau "thing") forms an abstract noun (e.g. rucu "good", cina rucu "goodness").

Agent nouns are formed using the word tamloci "person", with a (either full or partial) reduplicated verb or adjective (e.g. tamloci sasati "sinner").

Demonyms are formed by the word ta, or mara in the plural (e.g. ta Ethiopia "Ethiopian"). For women, cara is used, with no special plural form (e.g. cara Sameria "woman of Samaria).

Nouns do not have number, although the context may show number in a verbal phrase, or the adjective matuva may be used before or after the noun (e.g. matuva cinau "many things").

Tangoa appears to mostly lack grammatical gender, but some nouns denoting relationships are of common gender and use the prefix ve to indicate feminine sex (e.g. natuna "his child", venatuna "his daughter").

Reduplication of the noun intensifies its meaning (e.g. buti "hill", butibuti "mountain").

==== Pronouns ====
The following table contains Tangoa's personal pronouns.

Pronouns	Singular	Plural	
1st	enau (I)	Inclusive	enra (pronounced 'endra') (we, when including the addressee)
1st	enau (I)	Exclusive	kanam (we, when excluding the addressee)
2nd	egko (singular 'you')	kanim (plural 'you')	
3rd	enia (singular 'they', it)	enira (plural 'they')	

The pronouns also occur in shortened forms, used around or affixed to a verb to indicate its subject and object.

Short subject pronouns	Singular	Plural	
1st	a, na	Inclusive	ra
1st	a, na	Exclusive	ana, kana
2nd	o, ko	a, ka	
3rd	i	ila, la	

Short object pronouns	Singular	Plural	
1st	au	Inclusive	ra
1st	au	Exclusive	—
2nd	ko	—	
3rd	a	ra	

Tangoa has a clusivity distinction, a grammatical difference between inclusive and exclusive first person pronouns. The inclusive form is used when including the addressee, whereas the exclusive form excludes them.

A dual or trial pronoun may be formed with rua or tolu following the pronoun (e.g. enra rua "we two", kanim tolu "you three").

The word case "self, by one's self, alone, only" functions as an intensive or reflexive pronoun (e.g. i casena vili te? "will he kill himself?", la casera thano "they went away alone", egko casem "you only").

The particles sei "this, these" and atu "that, those" are demonstrative pronouns, and may either be used independently or follow a noun or pronoun (e.g. cinau sei "this thing"). These may be combined with the word cari (of unclear meaning), with the common forms carici "this" and caratu "that", although cari sei is apparently only used when referring to people (e.g. na uli carici "I write this"). Nacai "this" and natu "that" are also found (e.g. enau nacai "this is I").

Interrogative pronouns include care "who?", sa "what?", sansei "what is this?", se "which?"and visa "how many?" (used as a verb with the particles mo or i. Indefinite pronouns include te "some, any", te cinau "something", sobo tea "none", nakomo "a few, a little", tari "all", matuvana "many", catecateaci "each", tinabua "another, something else". Tuatua "some, a part of", takes a pronominal suffix (e.g. tuatuanim "some of you").

==== Possession ====
A noun in the genitive case follows the head noun (i.e. the possessor follows the possessed, e.g. tagisan Josep "Joseph's brothers", literally "brothers Joseph's", although such a construction can also form an adjective, e.g. ima poi "pig's house" or "fit for a pig").

In regard to possession, there are essentially two classes of noun. Head nouns of the first class are suffixed with -n if the genitive noun is also of the first class (e.g. natan Paul "Paul's nephew"). However, if the genitive noun is of the second class, no suffix appears (e.g. natu tamloci "man's son").

Head nouns of the second class are followed by the possessive nouns no, ca, pula or bula, which gain the suffix with -n (e.g. cinau non tananim "work of your father"). Non is sometimes followed by the article na (e.g. supe non na tamloci "rulers of the people").

First class nouns suffix a short form of the pronouns to indicate possession (e.g. tanaku "my father", natana "his eye").

Possessive suffixes	Singular	Plural	
1st	ku	Inclusive	ra
1st	ku	Exclusive	nam
2nd	m	nim	
3rd	na	ra	

For second class nouns, the shortened pronoun is instead suffixed to the possessive noun, of which there are four: ca for food, na for drink, bula for animal property, and no for property generally (e.g. noku reti "my word", bulanim poi "his pigs").

When used without a noun, the possessives are equivalent to the English "mine", "yours", etc (e.g. noku cinau tari nom, nom noku "all my things are yours, and yours, mine"). Possessives may be used with a verbal phrase (e.g. nona mo le thano or mo le thano nona "his going").

=== Verbs ===
A noun or an adjective may be used as a verb (e.g. rai "blood", mo rai "it bleeds"). Compound verbs are common (e.g. rogovosaci "to understand", literally "hear know").

There are no rules for the formation of a transitive from an intransitive verb; many verbs can be used with either connotation (e.g. mo calu "he deceives", mo calura "he deceives them". However, in some verbs the final -i resembles a transitive suffix (e.g. lavi "to give"), although many verbs end in an -i that does not appear essential to the meaning (e.g. sipai or sipa "to inherit").

Shortened forms of the subject pronouns are used in combination with a verb; these forms differ in the indicative and subjunctive moods (the table below shows the indicative forms), and in some cases are followed by a particle. Some examples of usage include ko oboiau "you love me" and mo verea "he told him".

Short pronouns	Singular	Plural	
1st	na	Inclusive	ra
1st	na	Exclusive	kana
2nd	ko	ka	
3rd	mo	la	

In the third person singular, the verbal particle mo is used instead of a pronoun. This particle is not used with the other pronouns.

When the subject is a noun, it is usually followed by one of these pronouns (e.g. nona vorai la verea "his brothers (they) told him", carai atu mo verea "that woman said to him").

To form the future tense, the particle pa (po after ko) follows the pronoun. I is also used instead of mo; the other pronouns also have forms for the future tense but their use is inconsistent. See the table below (these pronouns are also supposedly used for the imperative and subjunctive):

Short future pronouns	Singular	Plural	
1st	a	Inclusive	ra
1st	a	Exclusive	ana
2nd	o	ca, a	
3rd	i	ila	

Note that pa does not follow ila, and pa is not always used for the future (e.g. la pa lo cacau "while they were walking").

==== Aspect and mood ====
The suffix -si may indicate reflexivity or reciprocity (e.g. mo cati "he bites", mo cazia (katsia) "he bites himself, it pains him"). An alternative way to express reciprocity is by the verb's subject and object being identical, or with the word case (see above). Another suffix -ci is of unclear meaning (e.g. thaisatici "to hurt", from thai "to do" and sati "bad").

The imperative mood is shown by the pronouns o (for a singular referent) or ca (for a plural referent) preceding the verb (e.g. o nai! "come!"). Sobo follows the pronoun in the negative (e.g. o sobo natacu! "fear not!").

The particle le (sometimes la or lo) indicates the continuous aspect (e.g. na le reti "I am talking").

The verb moiso "to finish" indicates completion of an action and is placed after the verbal phrase la usia moiso "they had finished praying".

To negate the verb, the word sobo is placed after the pronoun (e.g. ca sobo natacu "fear not").

==== Other verbal constructions ====
Tha or the verb thai, "to do, make" are used as causatives; the latter form thai may be followed by a subjunctive phrase, but either form may be prefixed to the verb (e.g. cani "to eat", thacani "to feed").

The word vari preceding the verb emphasizes it (e.g. boi la vari cati "pigs naturally bite"). Verbs can be reduplicated to express the frequency of an action, and this is used especially with a plural subject (e.g. la case vereverera "they say among themselves").

The verb eri expresses ability or inability (e.g. mo sobo eri cite "he could not see", or alternatively the adjective suica is used). The verb rocu indicates unwillingness, whereas nasalo indicates a wish.

There is no copula, although the verb toco is used to mean "to exist" or "to be in" (e.g. tea mo sobo lo toco cinia "no-one was in it").

=== Adjectives ===
Adjectives follow their noun (e.g. tamloci vuso "blind man").

Certain adjectives are formed by combining a verb with the prefix na (e.g. rari "to tear, break", narari "broken"). The suffix ca, added to verbs and adjectives, seems to give an abstract meaning (e.g. mo rai "it bleeds", mo raiica "it is rusty"). Many adjectives appear to be reduplicated (e.g. nalonalo "naked", calucalu "false").

In comparisons, two positive statements are used. The preposition cin (variously meaning "of", "from", etc) may be used for "than" (e.g. carici mo rucu cin caratu "this is better than that". Superlatives are indicated by zea "very", mo lui "to pass", or mo thano "to go" (e.g. mo rucu rucu thano "it is the best").

=== Adverbs ===
The verbs thano "to go", nai "to come" and sace can be combined with other verbs to become directive adverbs meaning respectively "forth", "hither" and "up" (e.g. la alia thano "they carried him forth").

Interrogative adverbs include e "where?" (e.g. enia e "where is he?", ka taua e "you have laid him where?"), tamaci "how?" (a verb, e.g. ko vosaci tamaciau "how do you know me?", literally "you know how me?"), vara sa "why?" (e.g. ka nai vara sa "why have you come?"), and nata sa "for what, why" (e.g. ko sora isana nata sa "why do you talk with her?").

Adverbs of time include nake, nakerikerici "now, today", tebog "sometime, anytime, when", na bogi atu "at that time, then, when", tabuna "formerly", nanovi "yesterday", mo si nai nake "until now", na bog tari, thacatari, zezeu "always", na rani "by day", na bogi "by night", thacatea "at once, immediately", na bog nakomona "a little while", peravu "a long time" (from the verb "to continue"), mo rani "day break" (literally "it days"), mo ranina "the next day", mo rani palakavi "early in the morning", vuco, pavuco "tomorrow", ralavuco "early", na bog catecateaci "each day, every day", mo raviravi, na raviravi "in the evening", vutebog "at night", cinau atu moiso "after that", tuai "long ago, of old". Examples of usage include i pa sobo narocu tui "he shall never thirst".

Adverbs of place include nike, nacai "here", ea "there", zara atu "that place, where", mo nariviti "near", asau "far", na nipu "to the sea, seaward", na tarauta "to the land, landward", na vavasau "toward shore", nareu "on shore", na vuga tasi "on the sea", na tathalu nipu "over, beyond the sea". Examples of usage include o nai nike "you come here", wai matuvana ea "much water (was) there", la cite zara atu mo lo toco ea "they saw the place where he lay there".

Adverbs of manner include socena "thus", vila "quickly", vereverera "openly", tatacoloia "plainly", and roro "secretly".

Io and ece mean "yes" and "no" respectively. Sobo can also mean "no" or "not".

=== Prepositions ===
Simple prepositions, seemingly not derived from a noun or verb, include the locatives a (e.g. mo sakele a ima "he sat in the house") and na (e.g. mo nai na tharana "he came to the earth"). Na can also be used as an instrumental (e.g. mo amosi na palona na vuluna "she wiped his feet with her hair"). Other simple prepositions are isa, indicating motion to something or "beside, from" (e.g. mo turu isaku "he stood by me", la naricia isaku "they take it from me", na rulera thano isam "I sent them to you"), ta, indicating general relation or something belonging to a place (e.g. ta Tagoa "a man belonging to Tangoa", reti ta Tagoa "language of Tangoa"), nata, a causal preposition translating as "for, because" (e.g. ca usi moli nataku "pray to the Lord for me", natana mo usa "because it rained"), cini, a causal or instrumental preposition translating as "through, by" or meaning "about" (e.g. i pa nauri ciniau "he shall live through me", mo vere kanam tea cina sati cinico "he told us something bad about you"; this becomes cin before a noun e.g. mo reti cin Jon "he spoke about John"), and citacu "after" (e.g. citacu cinau sei "after these things"). Isa and cini are occasionally equivalent to possessives.

The prepositions mentioned above are sometimes combined with nouns to form a new preposition. These nouns include lolo "inside, in, within" (e.g. na lolo ima "within the house"), naco "before" (also meaning "face", e.g. na nacom "before you"), tano "below" (also meaning "earth", e.g. kanim ka ta atano "you are from beneath"), thatha "under" (e.g. na thatha vitoa "under the fig tree"), ulu "above" (also meaning "top", e.g. enau na ta aulu "I am from above"), vuga "on top, on" (e.g. mo cacau na vuga tasi "he walked on the sea"), livuca "between, among" (e.g. na livuca zara "in the middle of the place"), and tathalu "beyond, on the other side of" (e.g. la lo thano na tathalu nipu "they went over the sea").

Additionally, certain verbs can be used as prepositions: for example, tiroma "before" (e.g. mo tiromaku "he was before me"), usuri "after" (also meaning "to follow", e.g. mo usuriau "it comes after me"), coro "against" (e.g. enira la coroa "they opposed him"), and ralici "round about" (e.g. la turu ralicia "they stood round him").

=== Conjunctions ===
There is no simple copulative conjunction, although sometimes ordinal numerals are used. Tangoa also lacks a personal conjunction (e.g. John enau kana thano Tagoa "John (and) I (we) went (to) Tangoa", narouna enira rua "he and his wife", literally "his wife they two").

Socena means "likewise, also" and is used at the end of a sentence. Te means "or" (e.g. lanane te carai "men or women") and can also be used at the end of a phrase interrogatively. Natana means "because, on account of" (e.g. ca usi moli nataku "pray to the Lord for me").

=== Sentence structure ===
Interrogative clauses are shown by interrogative pronouns or adverbs, or by the particle te at the end of the sentence (e.g. ko ta Tagoa te? "are you a man of Tangoa?").

Dependent clauses are shown by the word vara introducing the clause and the future forms of the pronouns (e.g. mo usia vara i siwo "he asked him to come down").

Conditionality is shown by the juxtaposition of two statements (e.g. mo zuruvi, i zuria "(if) he sleep, he shall be well"); there is no equivalent of the English "if".

== Numbers ==
Cardinal numerals follow the noun and take the verbal particle mo, or occasionally another particle ca.

Tangoa	English
mo tea	one
mo rua	two
mo tolu	three
mo thati	four
mo lina	five
mo linarave	six
mo linaraverua	seven
mo linaravetolu	eight
linaravethati	nine
sagavulu	ten
mo sagavulu romana ma tea	eleven
mo sagavulu romana mo rua	twelve
mo gavulurua	twenty
mo gavulurua gavulutoluna ma tea	twenty-one
mo gapsagavulu	hundred
tari (also means "all, every")	thousand

Tea, "one", is commonly used as an indefinite article, particularly in its verbal form ma tea (e.g. tamloci ma tea "a man").

Sagavulu is ten; to make tens above the first, sa is dropped and a number added to the end (e.g. mo gavulurua "twenty", mo gavulutolu "thirty" but gavulina "fifty").

The existence of an ordinal is unclear, although sometimes the suffix -na seems to be in use, as in surrounding languages (e.g. bog catoluna "the third day", but na bogina mo linaravetolu "on the eighth day"). Multiplicatives are formed with the causative prefix thaca (e.g. thacatea "once", thacarua "twice").

== Selected vocabulary ==
The list below is a selected sample of words in Tangoa.

Tangoa	English
natu	child, son
mata	eye
takasa	friend
gabu	fire
balo	foot
kani	eat
alo	sun
thatu	stone
lito	spit
viriu	dog
rikiriki	small
utu	louse
boii	love
oneone	sand
sila	give
naro	run
ruku	good
oru, pati	tooth
rogo	hear
turu	stand
patu	head
vulu	hair
bogi	night
nabu	heart
neme	tongue
tali	rope

Interjections include o (indicating a vocative), e, he (both calling attention), ibo (showing wonder e.g. mo usa ibo! "what a great rain!"), pah "indeed", and po "truly, yes".
