= Tutuba language =

Austronesian language spoken in Vanuatu

Tutuba
- Native to: Vanuatu
- Region: Espiritu Santo
- Ethnicity: 1,300 (no date)
- Native speakers: 500 (2001)
- Language family: Austronesian: Malayo-Polynesian; Oceanic; Southern Oceanic; North-Central Vanuatu; North Vanuatu; Espiritu Santo; Tutuba

Language codes
- ISO 639-3: tmi
- Glottolog: tutu1241
- ELP: Tutuba
- Tutuba is classified as Definitely Endangered by the UNESCO Atlas of the World's Languages in Danger.

Tutuba is an Oceanic language spoken in Vanuatu on the southeast tip of Espiritu Santo Island and on Tutuba Island offshore.
