= Espiritu Santo languages =

Language group

Espiritu Santo
- Santo
- Geographic distribution: Espiritu Santo Island in northern Vanuatu
- Linguistic classification: Austronesian: Malayo-Polynesian; Oceanic; Southern Oceanic; North Vanuatu; Espiritu Santo

Language codes
- Glottolog: espi1234

The Espiritu Santo languages (alternatively Santo languages) are a group of North Vanuatu languages spoken on Espiritu Santo Island in northern Vanuatu. Tryon (2010) considers the Espiritu Santo languages to be a coherent group.

== Languages ==
Two lists of Espiritu Santo languages from Tryon (2010) and François (2015) are provided below.

=== Tryon (2010) ===
Tryon (2010) recognizes 33 living languages and 2 extinct languages. They are:

Language	Speakers	Area	Villages
Valpei (Tavanlav)	300	North-West Santo	Wunpuko, Valpei, Petani, Matalip, Pwar, Molpoe, Hakua, Maroa, Pwat, Pwatmwel (Onmwertev), Mwalovuko, Wunapak
Nokuku (Vevatot)	250	North-West Santo	Olpoe, Nokuku, Lajmoli, Vunon, Penaoru, Petawota
'Oa	300	North-West Santo	Tasmate, Sulesal, Vasalea
Vunapu	250?	North-West Santo	Vunapu, Pesena
Piamatsina	250?	North-West Santo	Piamatsina, Piamaeto, Peavot
Tolomako (Big Bay)	900	North-West Santo	Jureviu, Tuturu, Tavunamalo, Peavot, Vasi, Pialulup, Matantas
Kula	350	West Santo	Wusi, Kerepua, Elia 1
Bura	300	West Santo	Linduri, Putonro, Saktui, Maram, Patiare, Mapten, Nukupospos
Kene	300	West Santo	Vuimele, Navura, Papaisale, Arumalate, Latavoa, Pilipili, Lepurpuri, Potlavaisevu
Akei	4000	West Santo	Toramaori, Lalaolo, Tovotovo, Kerevinumbu, Tasiriki, Ukoro, Malovira, Tasmalum
Daruru	100?	West Santo	Pelmol
Retlatur	100	South Santo	Tanovusivusi
Ale	500	South Santo	Fimele, Wailapa
Aje	10	South Santo	Patunmevu, Nambaka, Wunamoli
Ande	500	South Santo	Tanmet, Lotunai, Ipayato, Tasmalum, Morouas
Araki	10	South Santo	Araki Island
Movono	370	South Santo	Tangoa Island
Farsav	400	South Santo	Nambel, Tanovoli, Narango, Funafosi, Nambauk
Tiale / Merei	400	Central Santo	Tavuimoli, Nazaraka, Mataipevu, Patuitano, Morokari, Angoru, Tombet, Navele, Vusvogo
Kiai	450	Central Santo	Wailapa, Fortsenale, Namoru
Ko / Mores (Farmores)	200?	Central Santo	Tanmet, Lemben, Tsarailan, Namafun, Patmarifu, Sarete, Mavunlif
Moiso	100	Central Santo	Moriuli
Toksiki / Soisoru	200	Central Santo	Morkriv, Pilnuri, Bengie
Tamambo	4000	East Santo	Malo
Aore	extinct	East Santo	Aore
Biliru	3	East Santo	Tambotalo, Belnatsa, Beleru, Belembut, Lambue
Farafi	300?	East Santo	Butmas, Tur, Maniok, Shark Bay, Naturuk
Ngen	250	East Santo	Vanafo (Tanafo), Mon Exil, Palon, Shark Bay
Ati (Meris / Miris)	85	East Santo	Fumbak, Naturuk, Nambauk
Se	20	East Santo	Vanafo, Butmas
Atin (Farnanatin)	120	East Santo	Nambauk (Patunfarambu), Fumatal
Farnanto	100	East Santo	Nambauk, Tanmet, Tafua
Mavea (Lonavu)	500	East Santo	Mavea, Aissi, Tutuba
Nethalp	extinct	East Santo	Lorediakarkar
Nekep	4000	East Santo	Hog Harbour, Port Olry, Kole 1

=== François (2015) ===
The following list of 38 Espiritu Santo languages is from Alexandre François et al. (2015:18-21).

No.	Language	Other names	Speakers	ISO 639-3	Region
27	Tolomako	Bigbay	900	tlm	Espiritu Santo
28	Piamatsina		250	ptr	Espiritu Santo
29	Vunapu		380	vnp	Espiritu Santo
30	Valpei		300	vlp	Espiritu Santo
31	Nokuku		250	nkk	Espiritu Santo
32	Meri	Tasmate, Oa	300	tmt	Espiritu Santo
33	Wusi	Kula	350	wsi	Espiritu Santo
34	Bura		300		Espiritu Santo
35	Merei	Tiale, Lametin	400	lmb, mnl	Espiritu Santo
36	Mores	Ko	200	mrp	Espiritu Santo
37	Ande	Morouas	500		Espiritu Santo
38	Toksiki	Soisoru, Roria	200	rga	Espiritu Santo
39	Kiai	Fortsenal	450	frt	Espiritu Santo
40	Moiso		100		Espiritu Santo
41	Kene		300		Espiritu Santo
42	Daruru		100		Espiritu Santo
43	Akei	Tasiriki	4000	tsr	Espiritu Santo
44	Retlatur		100		Espiritu Santo
45	Wailapa	Ale	500	wlr	Espiritu Santo
46	Farsaf	Narango, Nambel	400	nrg	Espiritu Santo
47	Varavara	Amblong, Aje	300	alm	Espiritu Santo
48	Narmoris		220	plb	Espiritu Santo
49	Biliru	Tambotalo	3	tls	Espiritu Santo
50	Atin		120		Espiritu Santo
51	Ati	Polonombauk, Meris	85		Espiritu Santo
52	Farnanto		100		Espiritu Santo
53	Se	Fanafo	20		Espiritu Santo
54	Sinia	Navut	520	nsw	Espiritu Santo
55	Butmas-Tur	Ati, Farafi	520	bnr	Espiritu Santo
56	Ngen	Shark Bay	450	ssv	Espiritu Santo, Litaro
57	Tholp	Nethalp	0	lnn	Espiritu Santo
58	Sakao	Hog Harbour, Nkep	4000	sku	Espiritu Santo
59	Mavea	Mav̋ea, Mafea	34	mkv	Espiritu Santo, Mavea
60	Tutuba		500	tmi	Espiritu Santo, Tutuba
61	Aore		0	aor	Espiritu Santo, Aore
62	Tamambo	Malo, Tamabo	4000	mla	Espiritu Santo, Malo
63	Tangoa	Movono	370	tgp	Espiritu Santo, Tangoa
64	Araki		8	akr	Espiritu Santo, Araki

=== Lynch (2019) ===
John Lynch (2019) proposes the following classification scheme for the Espiritu Santo languages, with the development of bilabial consonants to linguolabials as the primary marker of the "Nuclear Santo" group:

- Espiritu Santo
  - West Santo Group
    - Cape Cumberland: Hukua, Vunapu, Piamatsina (uncertain), Valpei, Nokuku, Tasmate
    - Wusi
    - Central Santo: Merei-Tiale, Okula
    - Kiai
    - Southwest Santo: Akei, Wailapa
    - South-Central Santo (Lynch: "possibly three dialects")
    - Outlier: Tolomako
  - Nuclear Santo Group
    - South Santo Group
      - Tangoa
      - Araki
      - Mavʼea
      - Tutuba
      - Aore
      - Tamambo
      - Outlier: Mores
    - East Santo Group
      - Shark Bay: Shark Bay I, Shark Bay II, Lorediakarkar
      - Southeast Santo: Butmas-Tur, Polonombauk, Tambotalo
      - Outlier: Sakao
