= North Vanuatu languages =

Subgroup of the Oceanic branch of the Austronesian language family

North Vanuatu
- Northern Vanuatu
- Geographic distribution: Northern Vanuatu
- Linguistic classification: Austronesian: Malayo-Polynesian; Oceanic; Southern Oceanic; North-Central Vanuatu; North Vanuatu

Language codes
- Glottolog: nort3205

The North Vanuatu languages form a linkage of Southern Oceanic languages spoken in northern Vanuatu.

== Languages ==
=== Clark (2009) ===
Clark (2009) provides the following classification of the North Vanuatu languages, divided into two main geographic areas (Torres–Banks–Maewo–Ambae–Pentecost and Santo). Outlier (aberrant) languages identified by Clark (2009) are in italics.

The South Pentecost languages, Ske, Apma, and Saa, are also often classified as Central Vanuatu languages.

- North Vanuatu
  - Northern (Torres–Banks–Maewo–Ambae–Pentecost)
    - Torres–Banks languages
      - Torres Islands: Hiw, Lo-Toga (“Loh”)
      - Banks Islands: Lehali–Löyöp (“Ureparapara”), Mwotlap–Volow (“Mwotlav”), Lemerig–Vera’a (“Vera'a”), Vurës–Mwesen (“Vurës”), Mota, Nume, Dorig–Koro–Olrat (“South Gaua”), Lakon (“Lakona”), Mwerlap (“Merlav”)
    - Maewo–Ambae–Pentecost
      - Maewo: Sun̄wadia, Sun̄wadaga, Baetora
      - Ambae: Duidui, Northeast Ambae
      - North Pentecost: Raga
      - South Pentecost: Ske (“Seke”); Apma, Sa
  - Espiritu Santo languages
    - Cape Cumberland (Nokuku); Tolomako
    - Wusi, Akei–Tasiriki–Tangoa–Araki (“SW Santo”), Tiale–Merei (“Central Santo”), Kiai, “South-central Santo”, M̈av̈ea (“Mafea”), Tutuba, Aore, Tamambo (“Tamabo”); Mores
    - Southeast Santo, Shark Bay; Sakao

=== François (2015) ===
The following list of 9 "Penama" North Vanuatu languages (Clark's Maewo-Ambae-Pentecost) is from François (2015:18–21). He also lists 17 Torres–Banks languages (2011:181) and 38 Espiritu Santo languages (2015:18–21).

No.	Language	Other names	Speakers	ISO 639-3	Region
18	Sungwadia	Marino, North Maewo	500	mrb	Maewo
19	Sungwadaga	Central Maewo	1400	mwo	Maewo
20	Baetora	South Maewo, Sungaloge	1330	btr	Maewo
21	East Ambae	Lolovoli, Aoba	5000	omb	Ambae
22	West Ambae	Duidui	8700	nnd	Ambae
23	Raga	Hano	6500	lml	Pentecost
24	Apma		7800	app	Pentecost
25	Ske	Seke	300	ske	Pentecost
26	Sa	Saa	3900}	sax	Pentecost
