= North-Central Vanuatu languages =

Subgroup of the Oceanic branch of the Austronesian language family

North-Central Vanuatu
- Geographic distribution: Northern and Central Vanuatu
- Linguistic classification: Austronesian: Malayo-Polynesian; Oceanic; Southern Oceanic; North-Central Vanuatu
- Proto-language: Proto-North-Central Vanuatu
- Subdivisions: North Vanuatu; Central Vanuatu

Language codes
- Glottolog: nort3195

The North-Central Vanuatu languages are a linkage of Oceanic languages spoken in Vanuatu and New Caledonia. It was proposed by Ross Clark, who reconstructed the proto-language of the entire group, viewed here as an early, mutually-intelligible chain of dialects. but this is not accepted by Lynch (2018).

== Languages ==
Following Clark (2009) and Glottolog 4.0, two major groups can be delineated, which are North Vanuatu and Central Vanuatu. Both groups are linkages.

- North Vanuatu
  - Torres–Banks
  - Maewo–Ambae–Pentecost
  - Espiritu Santo
- Central Vanuatu
  - Malakula
  - Epi-Efate
  - (various others)
