= List of islands of Vanuatu =

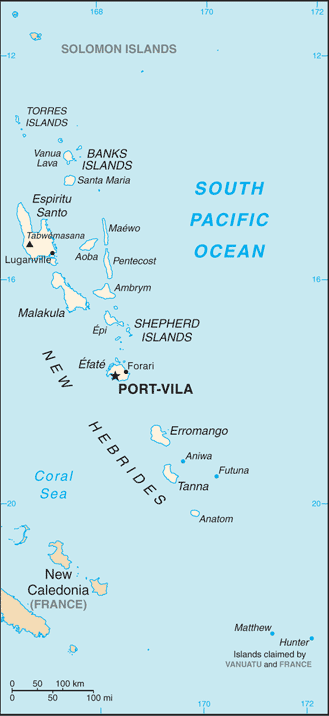

This is a list of islands of Vanuatu by province, largely from north to south, subdivided by archipelago when appropriate. Vanuatu is usually said to contain 83 islands.

== Islands ==
- Torba Province
  - Torres Islands
    - Hiw
    - Metoma (uninhabited, but formerly inhabited)
    - Tegua
    - Ngwel (uninhabited)
    - Linua
    - Lo
    - Toga
  - Banks Islands
    - Vet Tagde
    - Ureparapara
    - Rowa Islands (Reef Islands)
      - Enwut (uninhabited)
      - Lomeur
    - Vanua Lava
      - Kwakea
      - Leneu
      - Nawila
      - Ravenga
    - Gaua (Santa Maria Island)
    - Mota
    - Mota Lava (Saddle)
      - Ra Island
    - Merig
    - Mere Lava
- Sanma Province
  - Espiritu Santo
    - Dany Island
    - Araki (island)
    - Elephant Island
    - Dolphin Island
    - Sakao
    - Malohu
    - Malparavu
    - Maltinerava
    - Malvapevu
    - Malwepe
    - Oyster Island
    - Tangoa
    - Bokissa
    - Lataro
  - Malo
    - Asuleka
    - Malotina
    - Malokilikili
  - Aore
  - Tutuba
  - Mavea
  - Lathi
- Penama Province
  - Pentecost Island
  - Ambae (Aoba)
  - Maewo
- Malampa Province
  - Malakula
    - Akhamb
    - Arseo
    - Sakao
    - Maskelynes Islands
      - Avock
      - Awei
      - Leumanang, a small, officially uninhabited island in the Malampa Province of Vanuatu, located close to Malekula Island, which is the second-largest island in the nation of Vanuatu. The two neighboring islands are Arseo and Varo. Some sources claim that Leumanang is inhabited—but by only a few permanent residents. The island is richly covered with tropical greenery and is encircled by vibrant coral reefs. On Leumanang, traditional communal land ownership remains prevalent, with land held collectively by extended families in accordance with customary laws.
      - Uluveo
      - Vulai
    - Norsup
    - Sowan
    - Tomman
    - Uri
    - Uripiv
    - Varo is a small uninhabited island in the Malampa Province of Vanuatu. Varo is located close to Malekula. The two neighboring islands are Arseo and Leumanang. Although uninhabited, Varo is used by local people on a nearby island for fishing.
    - Wala
  - Ambrym
  - Paama
  - Lopevi (uninhabited)
  - Rano
  - Atchin
  - Vao
- Shefa Province
  - Epi
    - Lamen
    - Namuka (uninhabited)
    - Tefala
  - Shepherd Islands
    - Laika
    - Tongoa (Kuwaé)
    - Tongariki
    - Buninga
    - Emae (Mai)
    - Makura (Emwae)
    - Mataso (Matah)
    - Ewose (uninhabited)
    - Falea
    - Wot (Étarik)
  - Efate
    - Nguna
    - Emao
    - Moso (Verao)
    - Lelepa Island
    - Ekapum Lep
    - Erakor
    - Eratap (Castaway Island)
    - Mele (Hideaway Island)
    - Ifira
    - Iririki
    - Iriwiti Lep
    - Kakula (uninhabited)
    - Pele
- Tafea Province
  - Tanna
  - Aniwa
  - Futuna
  - Erromango
    - Goat Island (uninhabited)
    - Vete Manung (uninhabited)
  - Anatom
    - Inyeug (Airport of Anatom)
  - Matthew Island (uninhabited, claimed by New Caledonia)
  - Hunter Island (uninhabited, claimed by New Caledonia)
