= Fanla =

Fanla Saanembur Lonbato
- Village
- Location in Vanuatu
- Coordinates: 16°08′S 168°08′E
- Country: Vanuatu
- Province: Malampa Province
- Island: Ambrym

Population (2009)
  - Total: 250
- Time zone: UTC+11 (VUT)

Fanla is a small village situated in the north of Ambrym Island, in the archipelago of Vanuatu in Melanesia, in the province of Malampa. The original name of this place was Saanembur Lonbato.

This is a Kastom Village, which represents the traditional values of the region. The village population is about 250 persons. Wanmelbu, a legendary resident, created the foundations of the customary chief ranks still current in the northern part of the island. His eldest son, Tingtingru, had a dream vision of tams-tams (atingting), major components of the traditional tribal art of North Ambrym.

By Ambrym tradition, the people who live in the village of Fanla are all, without exception, the descendants of Wanmelbu.

== Notable residents ==
Magetafanla Roromal
According to oral tradition, he met captain James Cook (who actually saw the island only from the sea). Cook allegedly baptized the island under the name of the welcome gift presented by Roromal himself, an ignam, by pronouncing the words "am rêm" ("Here is your yam"). This phrase later became Ambrem or Ambrym. (The ancient name of the island was "Tumurin".)
Magekon Malmere
The first son of Fanla to repeat the ranking process.
Bule Tainmal
The most lauded leader of the island's history.
Tofor-kon Rengrengmal
The last person to have reached the high ranks, in 1972; died in 1999.

== Genealogy of the Chiefs of Fanla Village ==
- Golbahan
- Tanmonong Bariu Meto Bussumel
- Tanmonong Libu
- Magetafanla Roromal
- Magekon Malmere
- Bule Tainmal (? – 1972)
- Tofor Rengrengmal (1921–1999)
- Bonglibu César (1962)
- Ben Wiu Meltofor (1984)
