= Litslits, Vanuatu =

Litslits
- Village
- Location in Vanuatu
- Coordinates: 16°6′45″S 167°26′19″E
- Country: Vanuatu
- Province: Malampa Province
- Island: Malekula

Population (2013)
  - Total: 1,391

Litslits is a town in Vanuatu, in Malampa Province, on the island of Malekula. It is south of the city Lakatoro, with 1,391 inhabitants (2013). In the village, a marina was built, which serves for a convenient passenger connection with the Malekula island. Every week there is a fast passenger catamaran, operated by Fresh Cargo, with seats for about 60 people.
