= Norsup =

- Town
- Location in Vanuatu
- Coordinates: 16°4′0″S 167°22′58″E
- Country: Vanuatu
- Province: Malampa Province
- Island: Malakula

Population (2021)
  - Total: 2,998
- Time zone: UTC+11 (VUT)

Norsup is a town on Malakula Island in Malampa Province, Vanuatu

It is located near Lakatoro, the capital of Malampa Province.

== Population ==
As of 2021, it has a population of 2,998 inhabitants.

== Transportation ==
The town and surrounding areas are served by Norsup Airport, one of three airports of the island. Others are Lamap Airport and South West Bay Airport.
