= Lamap =

Lamap (Lamav) Port Sandwich
- Village
- Location in Vanuatu
- Coordinates: 16°25′0″S 167°49′55″E
- Country: Vanuatu
- Province: Malampa Province
- Island: Malakula
- Time zone: UTC+11 (VUT)

Lamap (formerly named Port Sandwich) is a village in Malampa Province on the Malekula island in Vanuatu. Lamap is a phonetic shift from "Lamav" meaning Flat land/Flat Place. It was originally referred to as “Lamav mo Mbao,” meaning “big flat land/place.”

The primary language in Lamap is Port Sandwich.

== Transportation ==
The village is served by Lamap Airport or Malekoula Airport.
