= Northeast Malakula language =

Oceanic language spoken on Vanuatu

Northeast Malakula
- Uripiv-Wala-Rano-Atchin
- Native to: Vanuatu
- Region: Malakula
- Native speakers: (9,000 cited 2001)
- Language family: Austronesian: Malayo-Polynesian; Oceanic; Southern Oceanic; North-Central Vanuatu; Central Vanuatu; Malakula; Malakula Coastal; Northeast Malakula

Language codes
- ISO 639-3: upv
- Glottolog: urip1239
- Northeast Malakula is not endangered according to the classification system of the UNESCO Atlas of the World's Languages in Danger

Northeast Malakula, or Uripiv-Wala-Rano-Atchin, is a dialect chain spoken on the islands of Uripiv, Wala, Rano, and Atchin and on the mainland opposite to these islands. Uripiv-Wala-Rano-Atchin is spoken today by about 9,000 people. Literacy rate of its speakers in their own language is 10–30%.

Uripiv-Wala-Rano-Atchin forms a dialect chain. The Uripiv dialect is the most southerly of these and has 85% of its words in common with Atchin, the most northerly dialect. Uripiv is spoken on the north-east coast of Malakula.

The Uripiv dialect is one of the few documented languages that use the rare bilabial trill, a feature that is not found in the Atchin dialect.

== Phonology ==
=== Consonants ===
Uripiv consonants
		Labial		Alveolar	Palatal	Velar
		plain	lab.	Alveolar	Palatal	Velar
Plosive/ Affricate	voiceless	p	pʷ	t	tʃ	k
Plosive/ Affricate	prenasal	ᵐb	ᵐbʷ	ⁿd		ᵑɡ
Fricative		β		s		
Nasal		m	mʷ	n		ŋ
Tap				ɾ		
Trill	voiced			r		
Trill	prenasal	ᵐʙ		(ⁿᵈr)		
Lateral				l		
Approximant		w			j	

- The sound /ⁿᵈr/ is considered rare, and its phonemic status is unclear.

Atchin consonants
		Labial		Alveolar	Velar
		plain	lab.	Alveolar	Velar
Plosive	voiceless	p	pʷ	t	k
Plosive	prenasal	ᵐb	ᵐbʷ		
Affricate				ts	
Fricative		β		s	
Nasal		m	mʷ	n	ŋ
Trill				r	
Lateral				l	
Approximant		w			

- Some speakers may pronounce sounds /s, ts/ as [ʃ, tʃ] in free variation.

=== Vowels ===
Uripiv vowels
	Front		Central	Back
Close	i			u
Mid	e	ø		o
Open			a	

Atchin vowels
	Front	Central	Back
Close	i	ʉ	u
Close-mid	e		o
Open-mid	œ		
Open		a	

- Sounds /e, o, œ/ are heard as [ɛ, ɔ, ə] in unstressed closed-syllable position.
