= Awei (Vanuatu) =

Island in Vanuatu

Coordinates: 16°33′S 167°46′E

- Interactive map of Awei

Geography
- Location: Pacific Ocean
- Archipelago: Vanuatu, Maskelyne Islands
- Area: 40 ha (99 acres)
- Highest elevation: 1 m (3 ft)

Administration
- Vanuatu
- Province: Malampa Province

Demographics
- Population: 0
- Ethnic groups: None

Awei (also Île Ui, Îlot Awé ) is a small uninhabited island in Malampa Province of Vanuatu in the Pacific Ocean. It is a part of the Maskelyne Islands archipelago.

== Geography ==
Awei lies some 400 meters off the south coast of Malekula Island. The neighboring island is Vulai. The estimated terrain elevation above sea level is just 1 meter. The island area is 40 hectares.
