= Ratua (Vanuatu) =

- Island
- Location in Vanuatu
- Coordinates: 15°36′44″S 167°10′52″E
- Country: Vanuatu
- Province: Sanma Province

Area
  - Total: 0.59 km^{2} (0.23 sq mi)
- Time zone: UTC+11 (VUT)
- Website: Official website

Ratua, situated in the Vanuatu archipelago, is a 146-acre (59 ha) island located south of Espiritu Santo, between Aore and Malo islands.

== History ==
In 1906, during the Anglo-French condominium colony, when the Vanuatu archipelago was originally named New Hebrides until its independence in 1980, the island of Ratua was an uninhabited French coconut plantation where copra was produced.

== Geography ==
Covering roughly 146 acres (59 hectares), Ratua Island is a low-lying sanctuary blanketed by tropical vegetation, coconut groves, and native fruit trees. Tucked between the neighboring islands of Aore and Malo, Ratua is naturally sheltered from open-ocean swells and heavy winds. This geographical position creates exceptionally calm, glass-like waters and clear lagoon conditions that support vibrant coral reefs and thriving marine life, including sea turtles.

Due to its proximity to Espiritu Santo, the island is accessible via a short 30-minute boat ride from Luganville, making it one of the more accessible offshore islets in the Sanma Province.

In addition to boat access from Luganville, the island features a private grass airstrip (approx. 700 meters / 2,300 feet) on its southern coast, allowing direct charter flight access.

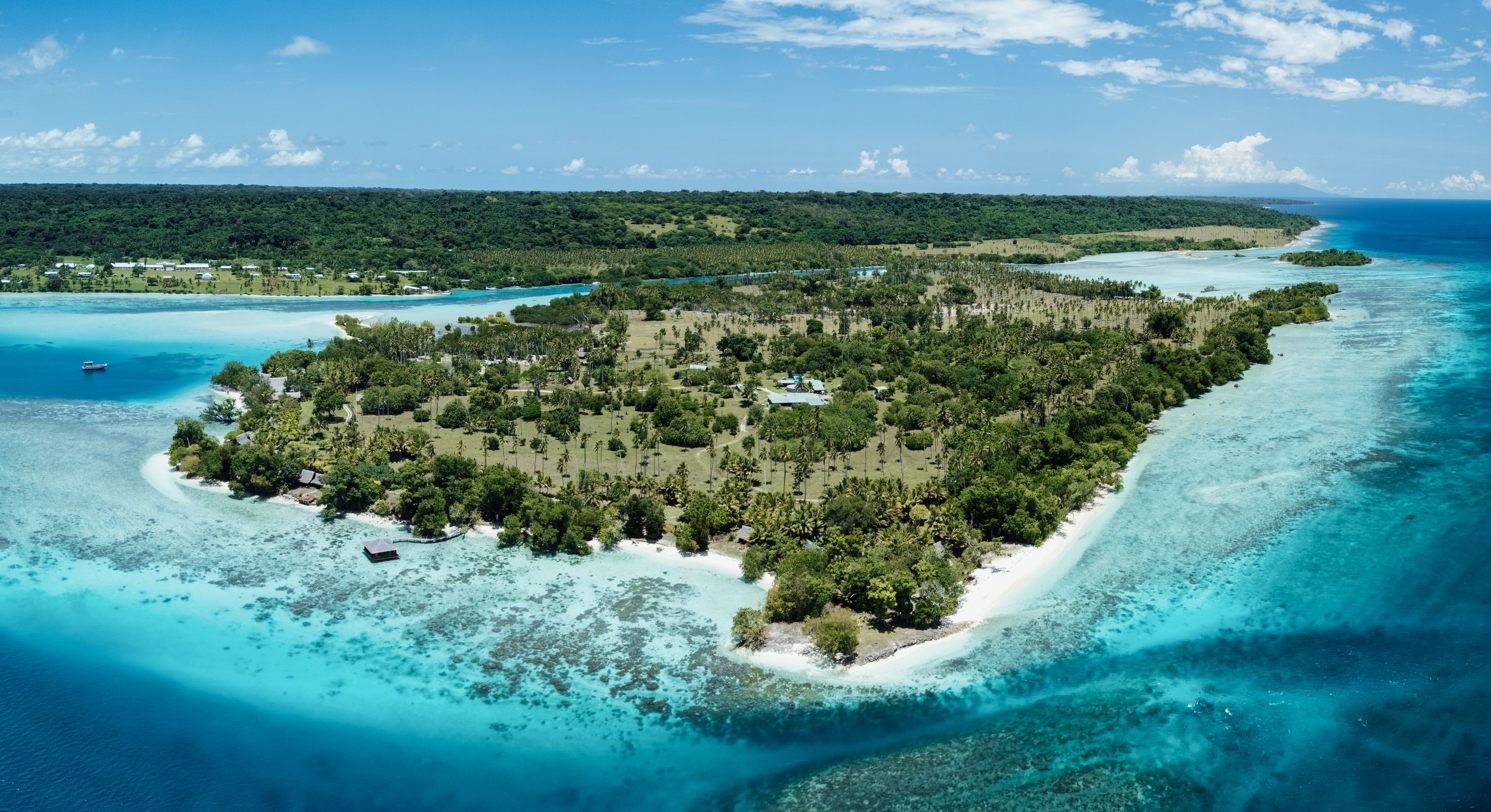
Ratua Island with Aore Island and Port Lautour behind it

== Resort ==
In 2005, the island was purchased by a French environmentalist with the intention of developing a low-impact, ecologically sustainable private resort. Rather than constructed modern resort fixtures, the development introduced an architectural style utilizing 200-year-old traditional teak wood villas sourced from Indonesia. The historic structures were dismantled, transported across the Pacific, and reassembled by hand on the island's beachfront to preserve its natural footprint. By the 2010s, the resort transitioned its operational philosophy into a philanthropic endeavor under the management of the Ratua Foundation. The non-profit model directed 100% of the resort’s profits into local infrastructure, funding educational resources, schools, and medical aid for the surrounding Ni-Vanuatu communities on neighboring islands.

In April 2020, Ratua Island sustained catastrophic infrastructure damage from Category 5 Cyclone Harold, which severely impacted the Sanma Province. The environmental destruction coincided with the global travel restrictions of the COVID-19 pandemic, forcing a multi-year closure of the resort. A subsequent kitchen fire further impacted the remaining main facilities, requiring a comprehensive structural rebuild of the central grounds and the iconic Yacht Club.

In April 2025, the island entered a new chapter of ownership under French technology entrepreneur Jean-Yves Sireau, founder of the global trading platform Deriv. Following a massive architectural restoration project, the island was relaunched with a strict focus on "barefoot luxury," environmental preservation, and cultural conservation. Under Sireau's ownership which extends to the neighboring Kwakea Island, management pivoted toward protecting the northern provinces' unique ecosystems, cultivating authentic Ni-Vanuatu cultural partnerships, and reviving the island's signature wildlife sanctuary, including its renowned free-roaming swimming horses.

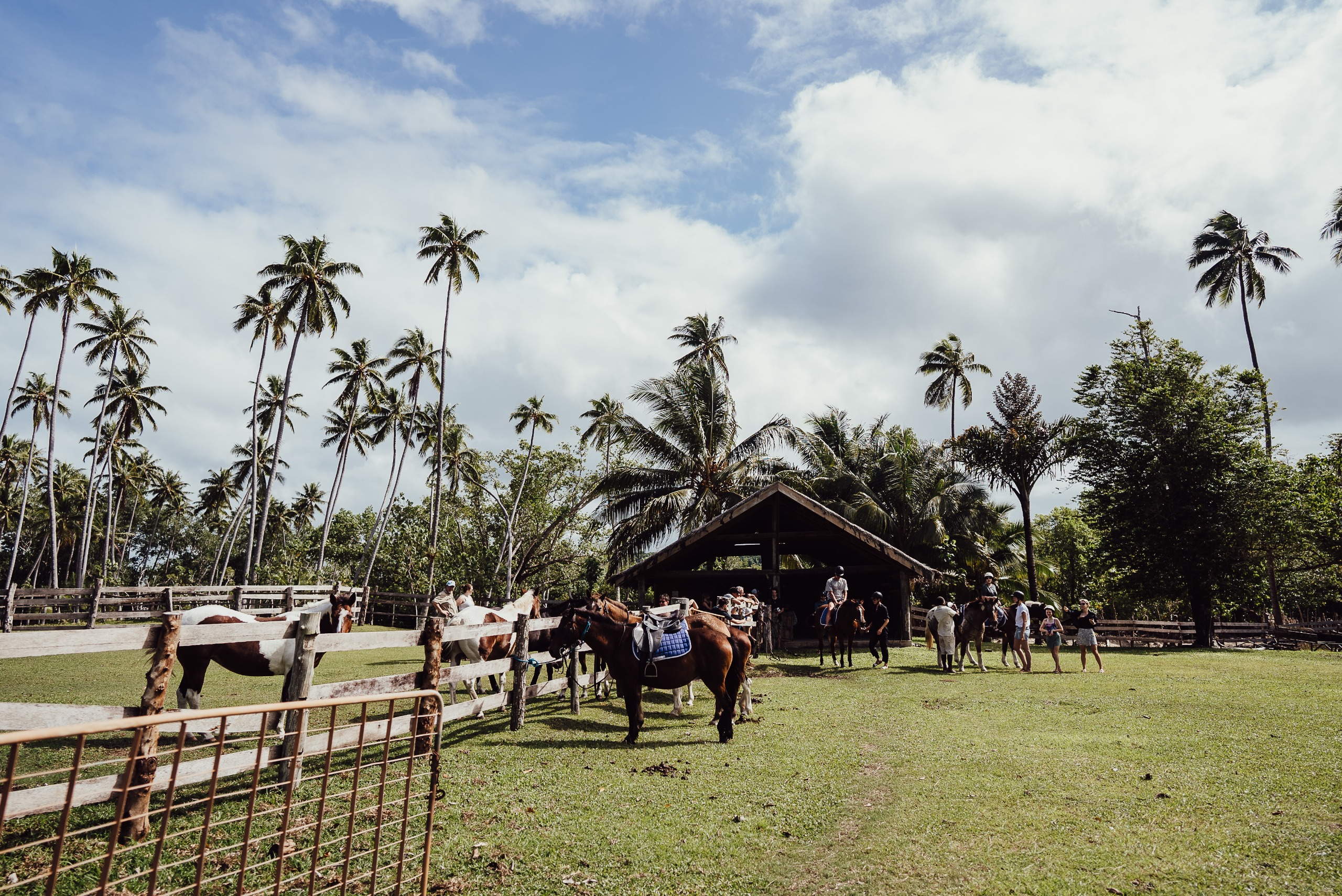
Horse stables for the guided swimming with horses activity on the resort
