= Uripiv =

Island in Malampa, Vanuatu

- Location within Vanuatu

Geography
- Location: Pacific Ocean
- Coordinates: 16°04′14.7″S 167°27′03.1″E
- Archipelago: Vanuatu
- Highest elevation: 8 m (26 ft)

Administration
- Vanuatu
- Province: Malampa Province

Demographics
- Population: 351 (2015)
- Ethnic groups: None

Uripiv is a small inhabited island in Malampa Province of Vanuatu in the Pacific Ocean. Uripiv lies off the north coast of Malekula Island. The estimated terrain elevation above the sea level is some 8 meters.

== Population ==
As of 2015, the official population of the island was 351 people in 76 households. Local people speak Uripiv language, a dialect of the language spoken on the north-east coast of Malakula. The language is referred to as Northeast Malakula or Uripiv-Wala-Rano-Atchin, and is spoken on the islands of Uripiv, Wala, Rano, and Atchin and on the mainland opposite to these islands.
