= Sakao Island =

Sakao Island (French: Île Sakao) may refer to one of the two following islands in the archipelago of Vanuatu:

- Sakao Island (Sanma, Vanuatu), off the country's largest island Espiritu Santo, in Sanma province
- Sakao Island (Malampa, Vanuatu), off the country's second largest island Malakula, in Malampa province

== See also ==
- List of islands of Vanuatu
