= CRI Malakula =

Coordinates: 16°15′S 167°30′E

CRI Malakula at 106 FM is a radio station in Malakula, Vanuatu. It is part of China Radio International. It broadcasts primarily in English. The CRI programme schedule includes the following:

- The Hot Pot Show hosted by DJ Duggy Day
- China Now program hosted by Man Lin & Tim.
