= List of shipwrecks in August 1879 =

The list of shipwrecks in August 1879 includes ships sunk, foundered, grounded, or otherwise lost during August 1879.

== 1 August ==
List of shipwrecks: 1 August 1879
Ship	State	Description
Anglian	United Kingdom	The steamship ran aground on the Ladybank, six miles south of Dundee, Forfarshire during fog. She was on a voyage from London to Dundee.
Gem of the Ocean	United States	The medium clipper was driven ashore and wrecked on Vancouver Island, British Columbia, Canada. She was on a voyage from Seattle, Washington to San Francisco, California.
Hannah Louisa	United Kingdom	The ketch was beached at Perranporth, Cornwall after the captain mistook Perran for Padstow. Her crew were rescued by the rocket apparatus. She was on a voyage from Lydney, Gloucestershire to Wadebridge, Cornwall. Hannah Louisa was refloated on 4 August. She was taken in tow by the tug Amazon (United Kingdom) but foundered off Trevose Head with the loss of two of the eight people on board. Survivors were rescued by Amazon.
Jeune France	United Kingdom	The pilot cutter was driven ashore at Dungeness, Kent, United Kingdom. She was refloated.
Quito	United Kingdom	The ship departed from Gibraltar for Dunkirk, Nord, France. No further trace, presumed foundered with the loss of all eighteen crew.

== 2 August ==
List of shipwrecks: 2 August 1879
Ship	State	Description
Bacchus	United Kingdom	The trow sank at Penarth, Glamorgan. Her three crew survived.
Harriet	United Kingdom	The brigantine was wrecked at the mouth of the Volta River. Her five crew were rescued from the wreck the next day. She was on a voyage from the Cape Coast Castle to "Jellah Coffee", Dahomey.
Hoopoe	United Kingdom	The steamship caught fire at Huelva, Spain and was scuttled. She was refloated on 8 August.

== 3 August ==
List of shipwrecks: 3 August 1879
Ship	State	Description
Gwendoline	United Kingdom	The steamship ran aground at Maassluis, South Holland, Netherlands. She was on a voyage from Bilbao, Spain to Rotterdam, South Holland.
Jenny Lind	United Kingdom	The ship was driven ashore at Sheerness, Kent.
Magdeburg	United Kingdom	The ship ran aground on the Doganastan Shoal. She was on a voyage from Cardiff, Glamorgan to Sulina, United Principalities.
Overijssel	Netherlands	The steamship was driven ashore and wrecked at Cape Guardafui, Majeerteen Sultanate. She was on a voyage from Java, Netherlands East Indies to Southampton, Hampshire, United Kingdom and Rotterdam.

== 4 August ==
List of shipwrecks: 4 August 1879
Ship	State	Description
Marie Stella	France	The lugger went ashore near Hartland Quay, Devon. Her crew were rescued.

== 5 August ==
List of shipwrecks: 5 August 1879
Ship	State	Description
Clara	Norway	The schooner ran aground off Falsterbo, Sweden. She was on a voyage from Vyborg, Grand Duchy of Finland to Ipswich, Suffolk, United Kingdom. She was refloated with assistance and towed in to Copenhagen, Denmark in a waterlogged condition.
Darling	United Kingdom	The steamship ran aground at "Ragnas", Denmark.
James Groves	United Kingdom	The steamship ran aground at "Refnas", Denmark. She was on a voyage from Hartlepool, County Durham to Kiel, Germany. She was refloated with the assistance of a steamship and put in to Kalundborg, Denmark.
Portinscale	United Kingdom	The barque was wrecked on the Alderman Rock, off Crookhaven, County Cork.

== 6 August ==
List of shipwrecks: 6 August 1879
Ship	State	Description
Benton	United Kingdom	The steamship put in to the River Tyne on fire and was scuttled. She was on a voyage from London to Leith, Lothian.
Garibaldi	New Zealand	The 51-ton schooner stranded on a spit at Hokitika, New Zealand. She became a total wreck.
Harvard	United States	The full-rigged ship ran aground at Dunkirk, Nord, France. She was on a voyage from Talcahuano, Chile to Dunkirk. She was refloated on 11 August.
Mabel Young	United Kingdom	The barque capsized in a squall off Cape St. Francis, Cape Colony with the loss of nine of the fifteen people on board. She was on a voyage from Calcutta, India to Dundee, Forfarshire.

== 7 August ==
List of shipwrecks: 7 August 1879
Ship	State	Description
Marie Louise	Belgium	The shipw as wrecked on the Penarvan rocks, off Ouessant, Finistère, France while bound for Alicante, Spain. Seven of the thirty-four people on board were saved.
Thomas Keillor	United States	The ship caught fire at Antwerp, Belgium. The fire was extinguished.

== 9 August ==
List of shipwrecks: 9 August 1879
Ship	State	Description
Anna	United Kingdom	The brigantine collided with the steamship Lindisfarne (United Kingdom) and sank in the North Sea off Harwich, Essex. Her eight crew were rescued by Lindisfarne. Anna was on a voyage from South Shields, County Durham to London.
Eclipse	United Kingdom	The ship was driven ashore at Dunwich, Suffolk. She was on a voyage from Hull, Yorkshire to Barcelona, Spain. She was refloated with assistance from the tug Despatch (United Kingdom) and resumed her voyage.
Jane	United Kingdom	The barque ran aground at "Bacalaw", Gironde, France.
Kalahome	New South Wales	The barque ran aground in Rivoli Bay. She was on a voyage from Newcastle to Beachport, South Australia.
Samuel Plimsoll	United Kingdom	The smack collided with the steamship Orlando (United Kingdom) and sank in the Dogger Bank with the loss of all but her captain from her five crew.

== 10 August ==
List of shipwrecks: 10 August 1879
Ship	State	Description
Gongora, and Lucretia	Spain; United Kingdom	The steamship Gongora collided with the steamship Lucretia and sank in the Atlantic Ocean off the coast of Portugal (41°30′N 9°30′W) with the loss of fifteen of her 24 crew. She was on a voyage from Santander to Seville. Lucretia was severely damaged and put in to Lisbon. She was on a voyage from Odesa, Russia to Antwerp, Belgium.
Wolviston	United Kingdom	The steamship was driven ashore at Cabezos, Spain. She subsequently became a wreck.
Unnamed	Flag unknown	The barque was driven ashore between Dunwich and Sizewell, Suffolk, United Kingdom.

== 11 August ==
List of shipwrecks: 11 August 1879
Ship	State	Description
Camperdown	United Kingdom	The abandoned ship was discovered in a waterlogged condition and was taken in to Söderhamn, Sweden. Her crew had been rescued previously.
Flirt	United Kingdom	The schooner was driven ashore at Sundre, Gotland, Sweden.
Izaro	Spain	The steamship was wrecked at "Honningso", near Kristiansand, Norway. Her crew survived. She was on a voyage from Newcastle upon Tyne, Northumberland, United Kingdom to Kristiansand.
John Ernest	United Kingdom	The ship was driven ashore and wrecked at Thisted, Denmark. Her crew were rescued. She was on a voyage from Grimsby, Lincolnshire to Christiania, Norway.
Nankin	United Kingdom	The steamship ran ashore at Mear's Point, Coverack, Cornwall in thick fog. She was on a voyage from London to Cardiff, Glamorgan. Refloated and towed to Falmouth in September. Nankin was refloated on 19 September and taken in to Falmouth, Cornwall by the steamship Recovery (United Kingdom).
Trevithick	United Kingdom	The steamship ran aground on the Zuidwal, in the Waddenzee. She was on a voyage from Newcastle upon Tyne, Northumberland to the Nieuwe Diep.

== 12 August ==
List of shipwrecks: 12 August 1879
Ship	State	Description
Agostino	Italy	The barque ran aground in the Bute Channel. She was on a voyage from Cardiff, Glamorgan, United Kingdom to Buenos Aires, Argentina.
Avon	United Kingdom	The steamship was wrecked on the Burren Rocks, off Lambay Island, County Dublin. Her crew were rescued. She was on a voyage from Dublin to Dunkirk, Nord, France.
Dauntless	United States	The full-rigged ship was driven ashore at Littlestone-on-Sea, Kent, United Kingdom. She was refloated.
Deborah	Germany	The schooner was driven ashore and wrecked at Bremen. She was on a voyage from Saint Petersburg, Russia to Bremen.
Prudhoe Castle	United Kingdom	The steamship was driven ashore at the mouth of the Eider. She was on a voyage from Newcastle upon Tyne, Northumberland to Tønning.
Raglan	United Kingdom	The steamship ran aground in the Bute Channel. She was on a voyage from Cardiff to Alicante, Spain.
Semiramide	United Kingdom	The steamship collided with the steamship Corsica (United Kingdom) and sank in the Atlantic Ocean 100 nautical miles (190 km) west of Cape Clear Island, County Cork. All on board were rescued by Corsica. Semiramide was on a voyage from Boston, Massachusetts to Liverpool, Lancashire, United Kingdom.
Thistle	United Kingdom	The steamship was driven ashore at "Tor Point". She was on a voyage from Londonderry to "Newcombe". She was refloated and put back to Londonderry.
Tiranto	United Kingdom	The steamship was driven ashore at Smygehamn, Sweden. She was on a voyage from Danzig, Germany to Honfleur, Manche, France.

== 13 August ==
List of shipwrecks: 13 August 1879
Ship	State	Description
City of London	United Kingdom	The steamship collided with the steamship Vesta (Germany) and sank in the River Thames at Barking, Essex. All 136 people on board were rescued, some of them by Vesta. City of London was refloated on 16 August and placed under repair.
Dagmar	United Kingdom	The steamship ran aground in the Haff. She was on a voyage from London to Königsberg, Germany. She was refloated.
Zurich	United Kingdom	The full-rigged ship was wrecked on the Haisborough Sands, in the North Sea off the coast of Norfolk. All seventeen people on board were rescued by the Palling Lifeboat. She was on a voyage from the River Tyne to La Spezia, Italy.

== 14 August ==
List of shipwrecks: 14 August 1879
Ship	State	Description
Cadet	United States	The schooner was wrecked at Langlade Island, Nova Scotia, Canada. Her crew were rescued.
Maria Beertje	Netherlands	The brig sprang a leak and was beached at "Prai Araraugua", Brazil with the loss of all but one of her crew. She was on a voyage from Hamburg, Germany to the Rio Grande do Sul and Porto Alegre.

== 15 August ==
List of shipwrecks: 15 August 1879
Ship	State	Description
Enterprise	United Kingdom	The brigantine ran aground at Ballyness, County Donegal and broke in two. Her crew were rescued. She was on a voyage from Ballyness to London.
Julie	Norway	The full-rigged ship was wrecked on Fair Isle, United Kingdom. Her crew were rescued. She was on a voyage from Greenock, Renfrewshire, United Kingdom to Kronstadt, Russia.
Kenley	United Kingdom	The steamship ran aground at Runton, Norfolk. She was refloated the next day.
Lanchester	United Kingdom	The steamship ran aground at Sunderland, County Durham. She was on a voyage from Sunderland to Saint-Nazaire, Ille-et-Vilaine, France. She was refloated with assistance and resumed her voyage.
Olga	Denmark	The schooner sprang a leak and sank in the Baltic Sea. Her crew were rescued. She was on a voyage from Fredrikstad to Lübeck, Germany.

== 16 August ==
List of shipwrecks: 16 August 1879
Ship	State	Description
Alleghany	United States	The schooner ran aground near Racine, Wisconsin in Lake Michigan. Refloated 1 October.
Emily McLaren	United Kingdom	The barque was abandoned at sea in 51°40'S 78°00'W, about 100 nautical miles (190 km) west of Diego de Almagro Island, Chile. The crew were taken off by the barque Zadok (United Kingdom) and carried to Valparaíso. Emily McLaren was on a voyage from Liverpool, Lancashire to Callao, Peru.
Jane and Margaret	United Kingdom	The smack was wrecked near Newport, Monmouthshire. Her three crew were rescued by the Coastguard.
Paragua	Spain	The steamship ran aground at Culion, Spanish East Indies.
Pierre Frederic	France	The ship was abandoned off Dunkirk, Nord. Her crew were rescued. She was on a voyage from Riga, Russia to Dieppe, Seine-Inférieure. She was subsequently discovered 20 nautical miles (37 km) south west of the Noord Hinder Lightship (Netherlands) by the steamship Ousel (United Kingdom), which towed her in to Dover, Kent, United Kingdom.
Wild Rose	United Kingdom	The steamship ran aground at Seacombe.
W. R. Ricketts	United Kingdom	The steamship was driven ashore and sank at Ossly, Öland, Sweden. She was on a voyage from Kronstadt to Bremerhaven, Germany. She was refloated with assistance and taken in to Karlskrona, Sweden in a leaky condition.

== 17 August ==
List of shipwrecks: 17 August 1879
Ship	State	Description
Annie	United Kingdom	The steamship ran aground in the Chilia branch of the Danube.
Emma	United Kingdom	The fishing smack foundered off the Calf of Man, Isle of Man. All three people on board took to a boat; they were rescued 36 hours later by the schooner Boadicea (United Kingdom).
Killarney	United Kingdom	The steamship ran aground in the Yangtze. She was on a voyage from Newcastle, New South Wales to Shanghai, China. She was refloated on 19 August and taken in to Shanghai.
Laura	United Kingdom	The schooner was driven ashore at "Whiteness Head", Inverness-shire.

== 18 August ==
List of shipwrecks: 18 August 1879
Ship	State	Description
Berkeley	United States	Great Beaufort Hurricane: The ferry sank at dock at Portsmouth, Virginia in a hurricane.
Brave	United Kingdom	The smack foundered in the North Sea. Her crew were rescued by the smack Ventura (United Kingdom).
Crimea	United Kingdom	The brig was driven ashore and wrecked at Lagos, Portugal. Her seven crew were rescued. She was on a voyage from Huelva, Spain to Runcorn, Cheshire.
David Dudley	United States	Great Beaufort Hurricane: The barge broke loose from a Norfolk, Virginia wharf and was driven onto the Berkley Flats where she capsized. The crew and the captain's wife all rescued by a boat from the brig James Miller (United States).
Emma D. Blew	United States	Great Beaufort Hurricane: The schooner lost her rudder and ran aground in a hurricane one mile (1.6 km) north of Life Saving Station No. 21, 4th District on the New Jersey coast and was wrecked, a total loss of vessel and cargo. Her captain was rescued by the United States Life Saving Service, the other three crewmen waded to shore.
Flora Curtis	United States	Great Beaufort Hurricane: The schooner ran aground in a hurricane at Atlantic City, New Jersey one mile (1.6 km) south west of Life Saving Station No. 27, 4th District. Her crew was rescued by the United States Life Saving Service.
Ida B. Silsbee	United States	Great Beaufort Hurricane: The schooner sank at anchor in a hurricane in Pamlico Sound one mile (1.6 km) north of Hatteras, North Carolina, a total loss. Her crew was rescued by the United States Life Saving Service.
Jessy	(United Kingdom of Great Britain and Ireland) Guernsey	The barque ran aground and sank in the Prince's Channel west of the Prince's Channel Lightship ( Trinity House). Her crew were rescued by the steamship Vestal ( Trinity House). Jessy was on a voyage from Saint Sampson to London.
John C. Henry	United States	Great Beaufort Hurricane: The schooner foundered off Gwynn's Island in a hurricane with the loss of all on board.
N. P. Banks	United States	Great Beaufort Hurricane: The steamship went ashore on the grounds of the Norfolk Naval Hospital in a hurricane.
North Carolina	United Kingdom	Great Beaufort Hurricane: The barque ran aground in a hurricane one-half mile (0.80 km) north of Life Saving Station No. 4, 6th District on the Virginia coast. Later refloated by a wrecking company. Her crew made it to shore on their own.
Resolute	United States	Great Beaufort Hurricane: The steamship was driven onto the Berkley Flats.
Water Lily	United States	Great Beaufort Hurricane: The schooner parted her anchor chains in a hurricane and grounded in Hatteras Inlet. She was later refloated. Her crew was rescued by the United States Life Saving Service.
'Unnamed	Canada	Great Beaufort Hurricane: The steamship was driven ashore in Lake Saint-Louis and sank.

== 19 August ==
List of shipwrecks: 19 August 1879
Ship	State	Description
Adolphe and Laura	United Kingdom	The brig ran aground, capsized and sank at Rye, Sussex. She was on a voyage from Seaham, County Durham to Rye.
Edith Troop	(Dominion of Newfoundland) Newfoundland Colony	The ship ran aground on the Butterpladdy Rock, off the coast of County Down, United Kingdom. She was on a voyage from Baltimore, Maryland to Belfast, County Antrim, United Kingdom. She was refloated and taken in to Belfast in a leaky condition.
Georges	France	The derelict ship was taken in to Burnham Overy Staithe, Norfolk, United Kingdom.
John Beaumont	United Kingdom	The steamship was driven ashore at Port Edgar, Lothian.
Kronprinz	Germany	The steamship ran aground in the Elbe downstream of St. Pauli. She was on a voyage from Sunderland, County Durham, United Kingdom to Hamburg. She was refloated the next day and completed her voyage.
Marli	United Kingdom	The barque sprang a leak and sank at São Vicente Island, Cape Verde Islands. Her crew were rescued. She was on a voyage from Sunderland, County Durham to Santos, Brazil.
Pleiades	United Kingdom	The ship caught fire in the Belfast Lough and was beached at Whitehead, County Antrim. She was on a voyage from Troon, Ayrshire to the West Indies.

== 20 August ==
List of shipwrecks: 20 August 1879
Ship	State	Description
Alvo	United Kingdom	The steamship caught fire at Liverpool, Lancashire. The fire was extinguished.
Deodata	Norway	The brig ran aground in Carlingford Lough. She was refloated.
Gulow	Norway	The barque was driven ashore and wrecked on the coast of Nova Scotia, Canada. She was on a voyage from Hull, Yorkshire to Shediac, Nova Scotia.
Kathleen	United Kingdom	The Thames barge was run into by the steamship Maas (Netherlands) and sank in the River Thames at Northfleet, Kent with the loss of her captain.
Manilla	Italy	The steamship ran aground in the Suez Canal. She was refloated.
Unnamed	United Kingdom	The yacht ran aground on the Burbo Bank, in Liverpool Bay.

== 21 August ==
List of shipwrecks: 21 August 1879
Ship	State	Description
Chefoo	China	The steamship ran aground. She was refloated and taken in to Amoy in a waterlogged condition.
Edith, and Peace	United Kingdom	The steamship Peace ran aground and sank on the Middle Sand, in the Humber. Her 25 crew were rescued by tugs. She was on a voyage from Alexandria, Egypt to Hull, Yorkshire. The steameship Edith ran aground on Peace and was damaged. Edith was on a voyage from Rotterdam, South Holland, Netherlands to Hull. She was refloated and taken in to Hull.
Seagull	United Kingdom	The steamship was wrecked on Gafaru Island in the Maldives. Her crew were rescued. She was on a voyage from Calcutta, India to Colombo, Ceylon and a British port.

== 22 August ==
List of shipwrecks: 22 August 1879
Ship	State	Description
Amity	United Kingdom	The smack was driven ashore and wrecked at the Camden Fort, County Cork. Her crew were rescued by the Queenstown Lifeboat and the tug Lord Bandon (United Kingdom).
Amizone	United Kingdom	The ship was severely damaged by fire and was scuttled at Melbourne, Victoria. She was refloated on 5 September.
Montgomeryshire	United Kingdom	The ship was driven ashore on Vlieland, Friesland, Netherlands.
Broderfolket	Norway	The barque was driven ashore and wrecked on North Ronaldsay, Orkney Islands, United Kingdom. She was on a voyage from Calais, France to Baltimore, Maryland, United States.
Thiorva	Canada	The full-rigged ship ran aground on the Cork Spit, in the North Sea off the coast of Essex, United Kingdom. She was on a voyage from New York, United States to Ipswich, Suffolk, United Kingdom. She was refloated.

== 23 August ==
List of shipwrecks: 23 August 1879
Ship	State	Description
Emily	United Kingdom	The fishing smack foundered in the English Channel off Dungeness, Kent. Her crew were rescued by the fishing boat Mary Anne (United Kingdom).
Harry S. Edwards	United Kingdom	The steamship ran aground at Calais, France. She was on a voyage from Odesa, Russia to Calais. She was refloated the next day.
Josephine	United Kingdom	The brig was driven ashore on Læsø, Denmark. She was on a voyage from Hartlepool, County Durham to Kronstadt, Russia. She was refloated and resumed her voyage.
Tay Queen	United Kingdom	The yacht sank in the River Tay. She was refloated on 30 August.

== 24 August ==
List of shipwrecks: 24 August 1879
Ship	State	Description
Danube	United Kingdom	The brig was driven ashore at "Kjorring", near Tranum, Denmark. Her crew survived. She was on a voyage from Hartlepool, County Durham to Stockholm, Sweden.
Emmanuel	Norway	The schooner was driven into Corner (Imperial Russian Navy) at Kronstadt, Russia and sank with the loss of her captain.

== 25 August ==
List of shipwrecks: 25 August 1879
Ship	State	Description
Cathinka	Norway	The barque was driven ashore on Holmon, Sweden. Her crew were rescued. She was on a voyage from Rochefort, Charente-Inférieure to Kalix, Sweden.
Mia Madre E.	Italy	The barque ran aground on the Goodwin Sands, Kent, United Kingdom. Her 21 crew were rescued by the North Deal and Ramsgate Lifeboats. She was on a voyage from Baltimore, Maryland, United States to Hull, Yorkshire, United Kingdom. The wreck was destroyed by fire on 2 September.
State of Indiana	United Kingdom	The steamship suffered a steering gear failure and ran aground in the Clyde at Dumbarton. She was on a voyage from New York, United States to the Clyde.
Trafik	Sweden	The steamship ran aground at "Sjollen", near Malmö. She was on a voyage from and English port to Stockholm.

== 27 August ==
List of shipwrecks: 27 August 1879
Ship	State	Description
Fox, and Pilot	United Kingdom	The tug Pilot collided with the fishing boat Fox and was run ashore at Ardglass, County Down. Fox sank.
John Kerr	United Kingdom	The ship was sighted in the Atlantic Ocean whilst on a voyage from Middlesbrough, Yorkshire to Calcutta, India. No further trace, presumed foundered with the loss of all 36 crew.
Queen of Britain	United Kingdom	The brig was abandoned in the Bristol Channel. Her six crew were rescued by the Mumbles Lifeboat Wolverhampton ( Royal National Lifeboat Institution) before she sank.
Venture	New South Wales	The schooner was wrecked on the Chesterfield Reefs, off the coast of New Caledonia. Her crew were rescued.
Ville de Grenade	Flag unknown	The ship was driven ashore at "Frontero", Mexico and was wrecked.

== 28 August ==
List of shipwrecks: 28 August 1879
Ship	State	Description
Flora	Norway	The barque was abandoned in the Atlantic Ocean. Her crew were rescued by Dante (Austria-Hungary). Flora was on a voyage from Gloucester, United Kingdom to Quebec City, Canada.
Malvina	United Kingdom	The schooner was driven ashore and wrecked at Southsea, Hampshire. Her crew survived. She was on a voyage from Guernsey, Channel Islands to Whitby, Yorkshire.
Ouro	Austria-Hungary	The barque was wrecked at Rio de Janeiro, Brazil. Her crew were rescued.
Rescue	United Kingdom	The tug was destroyed by fire in the River Usk. Her crew were rescued.

== 29 August ==
List of shipwrecks: 29 August 1879
Ship	State	Description
Adriana	Netherlands	The brig was driven ashore at Narva, Russia. Her crew were rescued.
Albert Fesca	Germany	The brig was stranded at Falsterbo, Sweden, on a voyage from Bordeaux, Gironde to a Baltic port, in ballast. She was refloated in September and towed to Copenhagen, Denmark.
Courier	United Kingdom	The ship ran aground at Cowes, Isle of Wight. She was on a voyage from Fray Bentos, Uruguay to Cowes.
Elizabeth Ellen Fisher	United Kingdom	The schooner ran aground and was wrecked at Fleetwood, Lancashire. Her four crew were rescued by the Fleetwood Lifeboat. She was on a voyage from Ardrossan, Ayrshire to Fleetwood. She was refloated on 8 October and beached at Fleetwood for repairs.
Hilda	Norway	The barque was abandoned off Walney Island, Lancashire. Her crew were rescued by Duke of Connaught (United Kingdom). Thilda was on a voyage from Liverpool, Lancashire to Kronstadt, Russia. She was driven ashore and wrecked on Walney Island.
Ironopolis	United Kingdom	The steamship ran aground in the River Tees.
Marsala	Italy	The barque was abandoned in the North Sea 60 nautical miles (110 km) off Lowestoft, Suffolk, United Kingdom. Her crew were rescued by the smack Golden Harp (United Kingdom). Marsala was on a voyage from South Shields, County Durham, United Kingdom to Savona.
Stelling	United Kingdom	The steamship ran aground at Maassluis, South Holland, Netherlands and was wrecked. She was on a voyage from Newcastle upon Tyne, Northumberland to Rotterdam, South Holland.
William Dawson	United Kingdom	The steamship ran aground at Maassluis. She was on a voyage from Middlesbrough, Yorkshire to Rotterdam. She was refloated with the assistance of a steamship and resumed her voyage.

== 30 August ==
List of shipwrecks: 30 August 1879
Ship	State	Description
Aigle	France	The brig was driven ashore at "Gelterven", Sweden. She was on a voyage from Cádiz, Spain to Saint Petersburg, Russia.
Anna Marie	France	The barque was driven ashore and wrecked at Tamatave, Merina Kingdom.
Boa	Denmark	The barque was driven ashore at "Tistbarne", Sweden.
Hannah Booth	United Kingdom	The schooner collided with the Bull Lightship ( Trinity House) and sank. Her crew were rescued by the smack Lily of the Valley (United Kingdom). Hannah Booth was on a voyage from Seaham, County Durham to Lowestoft, Suffolk.
Reunion	United States	The ship was driven ashore and wrecked on Heligoland. Her crew were rescued. She was on a voyage from Mejillones, Mexico to Hamburg, Germany.
Sikkolina	Sweden	The ship was driven ashore and wrecked at Reval, Russia. She was on a voyage from Saint Petersburg, Russia to Gävle, Sweden.

== 31 August ==
List of shipwrecks: 31 August 1879
Ship	State	Description
Argyll, and Harald Haarfanger	United Kingdom; Norway	The steamship Argyll was run down and sunk in the Atlantic Ocean off the coast of Portugal by the steamship Harald Haarfanger with the loss of a crew member. She was on a voyage from London to China. Harald Haarfanger was on a voyage from Alexandria, Egypt to London. She put in to Lisbon, Portugal in a severely damaged condition.
Liverpool	United Kingdom	The tug suffered a boiler explosion and sank in the Irish Sea off Ireland's Eye, County Dublin. Her crew were rescued.
Mary	United Kingdom	The schooner collided with the Bull Lightship ( Trinity House) and sank in the North Sea. She was on a voyage from Goole, Yorkshire to Great Yarmouth, Norfolk.
Medina	United Kingdom	The schooner ran aground on the Pennington Spit, off the coast of Hampshire. She was on a voyage from Dieppe, Seine-Inférieure, France to Runcorn, Cheshire. She was refloated.
Tickler	(United Kingdom of Great Britain and Ireland) Jersey	The yawl sank off Saint Helier with the loss of two of her four crew.
Titian	United Kingdom	The steamship ran aground in the Suez Canal.

== Unknown date ==
List of shipwrecks: Unknown date in August 1879
Ship	State	Description
Abel	Netherlands	The barque was destroyed by fire at sea before 12 August. Her crew were rescued. She was on a voyage from Newcastle upon Tyne, Northumberland, United Kingdom to Atchin, Spanish East Indies.
Adelina	Italy	The barque was wrecked on the coast of South America with the loss of all hands.
A. E. Nordeskjold	Russia	The steamship was lost off "Namora". Her crew were rescued.
Amalie	United Kingdom	The ship was lost off the west coast of Africa. She was on a voyage from Sierra Leone to Bristol, Gloucestershire.
Antonietta	Italy	The barque foundered in the Atlantic Ocean. Her crew were rescued. She was on a voyage from Italy to the United States.
Barbadian	United States	The ship ran aground on the Robins Reef and capsized before 25 August. She was on a voyage from Havana, Cuba to New York.
Barry	United Kingdom	The ship sank off the North Foreland, Kent.
Carducens	United Kingdom	The steamship ran aground at Gibraltar.
Constantine	United Kingdom	The ship was driven ashore at Les Escoumins, Quebec, Canada. She was on a voyage from Limerick to Quebec City, Canada.
Durley	United Kingdom	The steamship was driven ashore at Cape St. Vincent, Portugal. She was refloated and put back to Gibraltar, where she arrived on 11 August in a leaky condition.
Etoile de Matin	France	The ship foundered off Cabo Espichel, Portugal. Her crew were rescued. She was on a voyage from Lisbon, Portugal to Ipswich, Suffolk, United Kingdom.
Fauna	United Kingdom	The ship ran aground on the Hittarp Reef, in the Baltic Sea.
Fayaway	United Kingdom	The ship ran aground on the Doom Bar. She was refloated.
Garth Barker	United States	The schooner was driven ashore in the Rio Grande.
Gleamer	United Kingdom	The schooner was driven ashore between Neath and Swansea, Glamorgan.
Ivanhoe	United Kingdom	The ship was driven ashore east of Bridport, Tasmania.
John E. Holbrook	United States	The ship was wrecked on Bimini, Bahamas. She was on a voyage from Inagua, Bahamas to New York.
John E. Hurst	United States	The schooner was run down and sunk off the coast of Pennsylvania by the steamship Camden (United States). All on board were rescued.
Joseph Hickman	United Kingdom	The barque collided with the steamship Rhein (United Kingdom) and sank in the Grand Banks of Newfoundland. Her crew were rescued by Rhein. Joseph Hickman was on a voyage from Bremen, Germany to New York.
Lamar	Chilean Navy	War of the Pacific: The transport ship ran aground and was wrecked at Caldera before 26 August whilst being pursued by the ironclad Huáscar (Peruvian Navy).
L. M. Merritt	United States	The ship was driven ashore at Lewes, Delaware. She was on a voyage from Guantanamo, Cuba to Philadelphia, Pennsylvania.
Lochleven Castle	United Kingdom	The barque was abandoned in the Pacific Ocean 80 nautical miles (150 km) off "Huafo Island" before 20 August.
Louis David	Belgium	The steamship en route for Naples was lost off Ouessant, Finistère, France sometime between 1 and 5 August with the loss of 27 of the 34 people on board.
Marquis of Lorne	United Kingdom	The ship struck a rock off Grand Manan, New Brunswick, Canada and became waterlogged. She was on a voyage from Saint John, New Brunswick to Liverpool, Lancashire.
Matthew Cay	United Kingdom	The steamship ran aground in the Dardanelles. She was refloated with the assistance of tugs and resumed her voyage.
Mercedes	United Kingdom	The ship ran aground at Nantucket, Massachusetts, United States.
Mitton	United Kingdom	The ship was driven ashore in the Fox River. She was on a voyage from Bristol to Quebec City.
North Carolina	United States	The barque was driven ashore at Cape Henry, Virginia.
Otto	United Kingdom	The ship was wrecked on Grand Cayman, Cayman Islands. Her crew were rescued. She was on a voyage from the Black River, Jamaica to the Clyde.
Oxe	Norway	The ship was driven ashore in Chesapeake Bay. She was on a voyage from Baltimore, Maryland, United States to Rouen, Seine-Inférieure, France.
Pisa	Italy	The barque was wrecked in the Bot River. All on board were rescued.
Ravenspur	United Kingdom	The steamship ran aground at Maassluis, South Holland, Netherlands. She was refloated on 5 August.
Rowena	(Canada)	The brigantine was abandoned in the Atlantic Ocean. She was subsequently taken in to Halifax, Nova Scotia by a prize crew.
Sedan	Germany	The barque was destroyed by fire at Port Elizabeth, Cape Colony.
Simon Bolivar	United States of Colombia	The ship was wrecked in the Magdalena River. She was on a voyage from Barranquilla to Honda.
Stanley	Norway	The barque was abandoned in the Atlantic Ocean before 22 August. Her crew were rescued by the barque Freir (Norway). Stanley was on a voyage from Glasgow, Renfrewshire, United Kingdom to Miramichi, New Brunswick, Canada.
Strathairy	United Kingdom	The ship was driven ashore at Nantucket, Massachusetts, United States. She was on a voyage from Cartagena, Spain to New York.
Tretre	France	The ship was driven ashore 6 nautical miles (11 km) east of Tangier, Morocco. She was on a voyage from Sunderland, County Durham to Bari, Italy.
Topaz	United Kingdom	The schooner was holed by her anchor and sank at Limerick.
W. C. Putman	United Kingdom	The barque was abandoned at sea. Her crew were rescued. She was on a voyage from Quebec City to Marseille, Bouches-du-Rhône, France. She was subsequently towed in to Sydney, Nova Scotia, Canada in a leaky condition.
W. R. Ricketts	United Kingdom	The steamship was severely damaged by fire at Kronstadt, Russia.
Two unnamed vessels	Flags unknown	The brigantine and schooner were driven ashore between Neath and Swansea.
