= Malekoula Airport =

Airport in Lamap, Vanuatu

Malekoula Airport Lamap Airport
- IATA: LPM; ICAO: NVSL

Summary
- Airport type: Public
- Serves: Malekoula, Vanuatu
- Location: Lamap
- Elevation AMSL: 7 ft (2.1 m)
- Coordinates: 16°27′14″S 167°49′23″E

Map
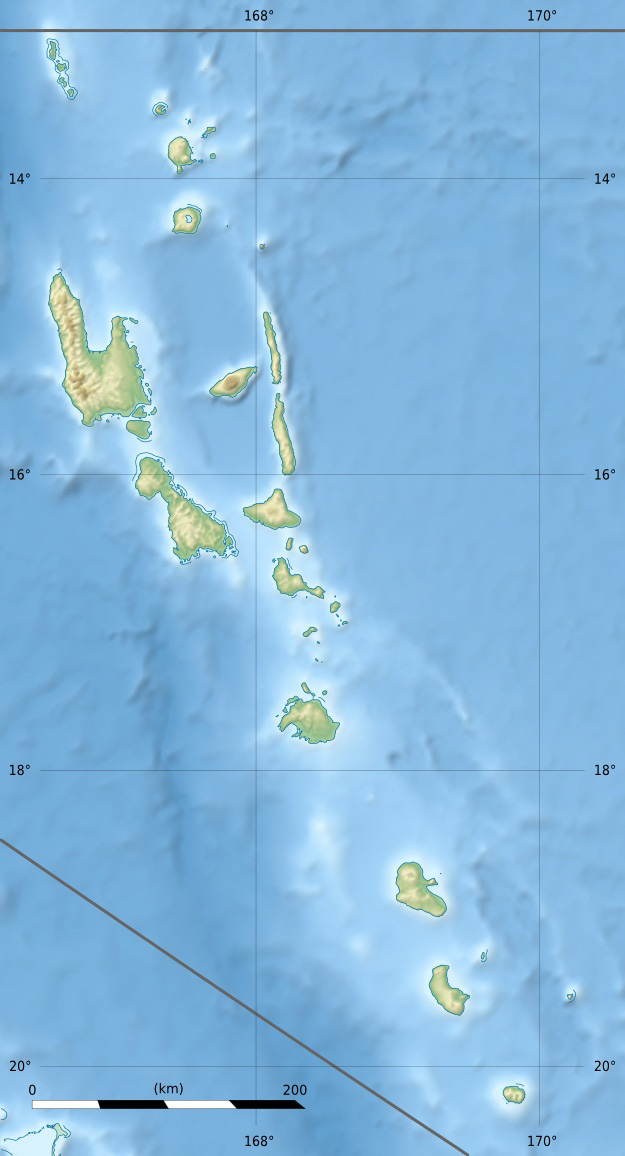
- Location of airport in Vanuatu

Runways
Direction	Length		Surface
Direction	m	ft	Surface
	840	2,755

Malekoula Airport (IATA: LPM, ICAO: NVSL), also known as Lamap Airport, is an airfield near Lamap on the island of Malekoula, in the Malampa province in Vanuatu. It is one of two airfields on the island, the other being Norsup Airport in the north.

== Facilities ==
The airport is at an elevation of 7 feet (2 m) above mean sea level. It has one runway which is 840 metres (2,756 ft) in length.

== Airlines and destinations ==
Air Vanuatu connects Malekoula Airport to Port Vila International Airport.
