= Asuleka =

Island of Vanuatu

- Interactive map of Asuleka

Geography
- Location: Pacific Ocean
- Coordinates: 15°37′41.31″S 167°10′59.78″E
- Archipelago: Vanuatu

Administration
- Vanuatu
- Province: Sanma Province

Demographics
- Population: 0 (2015)

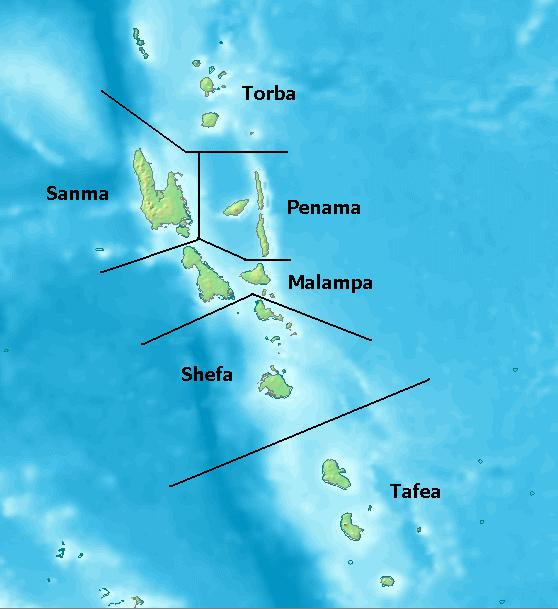
Vanuatu Provinces

Asuleka is a small uninhabited island in Sanma Province of Vanuatu in the Pacific Ocean. The neighboring islands are Ratua, Malo, and Aore. The island has a natural reserve.
