= Paama Airport =

Airport in Vanuatu

- IATA: PBJ; ICAO: NVSI

Summary
- Airport type: Public
- Serves: Paama, Malampa Province, Vanuatu
- Elevation AMSL: 2 m / 7 ft
- Coordinates: 16°25′55″S 168°14′08″E

Map
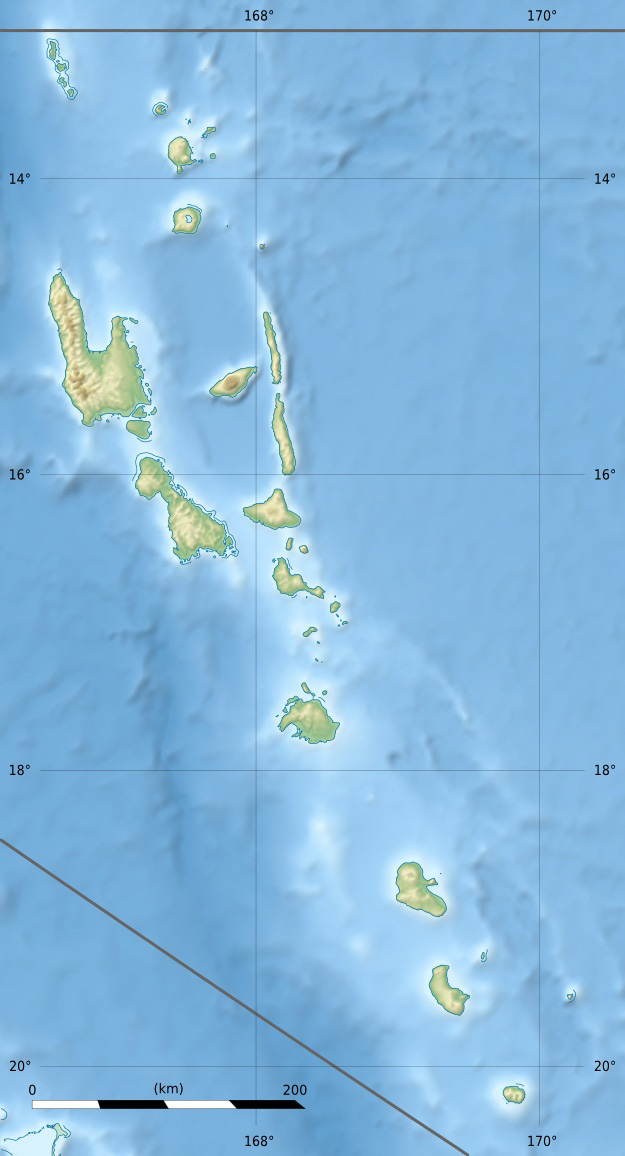
- Location of the airport in Vanuatu

Runways
Direction	Length		Surface
Direction	m	ft	Surface
09/27	610	2,001
- Source: GCM, STV

Paama Airport (IATA: PBJ, ICAO: NVSI) is an airport on Paama island, in the Malampa Province of Vanuatu.
