= Norsup Airport =

Airport in Norsup, Vanuatu

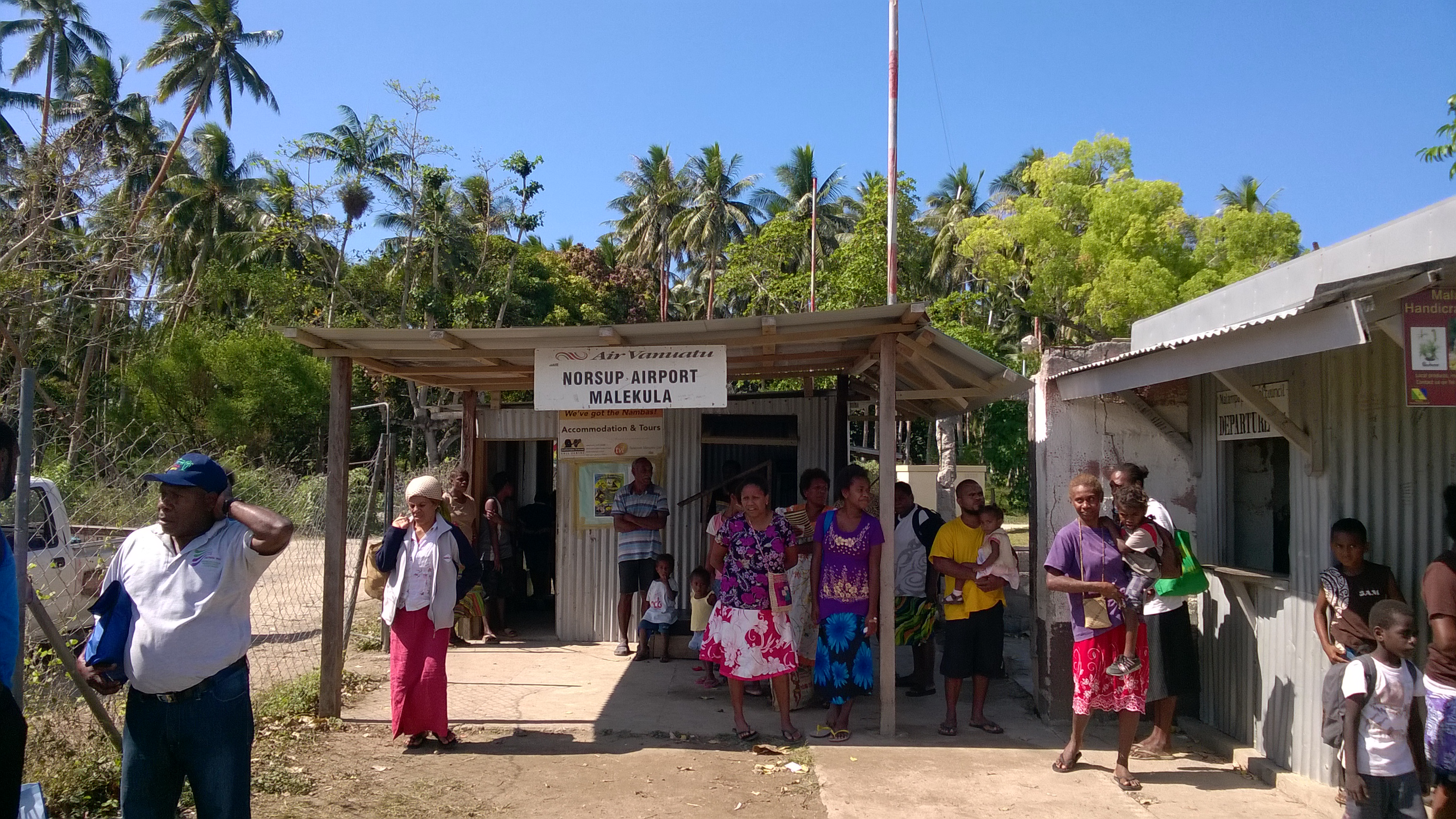
- IATA: NUS; ICAO: NVSP

Summary
- Airport type: Public
- Serves: Lakatoro, Malakula, Vanuatu
- Location: Norsup
- Elevation AMSL: 23 ft (7.0 m)
- Coordinates: 16°04′47″S 167°24′02″E

Map
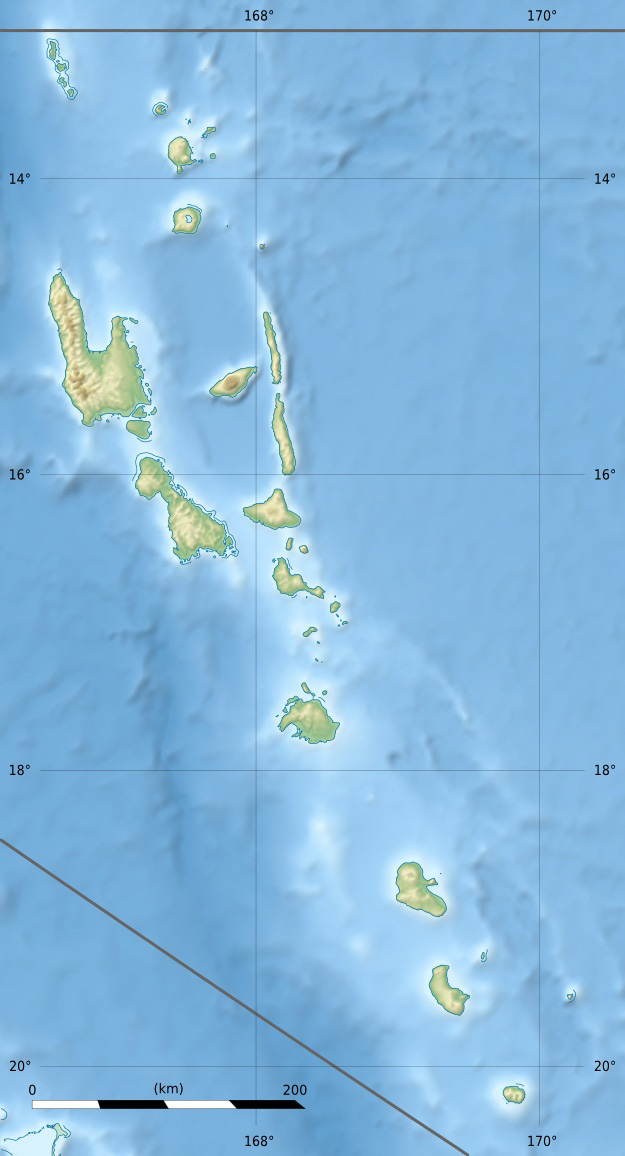
- Location of airport in Vanuatu

Runways
| Direction | Length | | Surface |
| Direction | m | ft | Surface |
|---|---|---|---|
| 13/31 | 950 | 3,117 |

Norsup Airport (IATA: NUS, ICAO: NVSP) is an airfield near Norsup on the island of Malakula, in the Malampa province in Vanuatu. It is one of three airfields on the island, the others being Lamap Airport and South West Bay in the south.

== Facilities ==
The airport resides at an elevation of 23 feet (7 m) above mean sea level. It has one runway which is 950 metres (3,117 ft) in length.

== Airlines and destinations ==
Air Vanuatu connects Norsup Airport to Santo International Airport (Luganville) and Port Vila International Airport.
