= Uluveo =

Island in Vanuatu

- Interactive map of Uluveo

Geography
- Location: Pacific Ocean
- Coordinates: 16.524°S 167.831°E
- Archipelago: Vanuatu, Maskelyne Islands

Administration
- Vanuatu
- Province: Malampa Province

Uluveo Island (also called Maskelyne) is a small, inhabited island in Malampa Province of Vanuatu in the Pacific Ocean. Uluveo is a part of the Maskelyne Islands archipelago.

== Geography ==
Uluveo lies just off the south coasts of Malekula Island and Sakao Island. It has an upscale resort, and a sanctuary for giant clams called the Ringi Te Suh Marine Conservation Reserve.

== Population ==
Uluveo is the main island in the archipelago and has three villages: Lutes, Pellonk, and Peskarus. Some of the local inhabitants speak the Uluveo language.
