= NBV =

NBV may refer to:

- North Bay Village, a city located in Miami-Dade County, Florida
- Nurses Board of Victoria
- Net Book Value in accounting
- National Bank of Vanuatu
