= Tofor =

Vanuatuan tribal chief (1918 – 1999)

Tofor-kon Tete Rengrengmal

Personal details
- Born: c.1918
- Died: December 1999 (aged 80–81)

Tofor-kon Tete Rengrengmal (c. 1918 – c. December 1999) was a traditional senior chief from the Malampa Islands of Vanuatu. He was also an army veteran who fought during World War II.

== Life ==
=== Early life ===
Tofor-kon Tete Rengrengmal was born around 1918. His father, Chief Bule Tainmal, was a chief in Malampa.

=== Career ===
He was recruited by his father, Chief Tainmal, to serve as his bodyguard.

During World War II, he was trained by the United States Army and fought in the Solomon Islands.

== Legal disputes and allegations ==
Tofor was accused of multiple murders, which led to legal disputes with authorities in both France and the United Kingdom. Efforts to pursue legal action were complicated by issues related to the availability and handling of evidence.

== Legacy and honors ==
By the time of Chief Bule Tainmal's death in 1972, Tofor had attained the rank of Meleun Getlam. He presided over his father's death ceremony and fulfilled his Mal rank obligations on the same day. Tofor died in December 1999 at the age of either 80 or 81.
