= Lakatoro =

- Village
- Location in Vanuatu
- Coordinates: 16°06′25″S 167°25′15″E
- Country: Vanuatu
- Province: Malampa Province
- Island: Malakula
- Time zone: UTC+11 (VUT)

Lakatoro is the capital of Malampa Province of the island country of Vanuatu. It is situated on the eastern shore of Malakula and is the largest settlement in that island. Lakatoro consists of a couple of retail shops, a supermarket, and a local market selling locally farmed goods.

== Climate ==
Climate data for Lakatoro (1961–2008)
| Month | Jan | Feb | Mar | Apr | May | Jun | Jul | Aug | Sep | Oct | Nov | Dec | Year |
|---|---|---|---|---|---|---|---|---|---|---|---|---|---|
| Mean daily maximum °C (°F) | 30.6 (87.1) | 30.7 (87.3) | 30.6 (87.1) | 29.8 (85.6) | 28.7 (83.7) | 27.9 (82.2) | 27.2 (81.0) | 27.4 (81.3) | 27.9 (82.2) | 28.6 (83.5) | 29.4 (84.9) | 30.1 (86.2) | 29.1 (84.3) |
| Mean daily minimum °C (°F) | 23.8 (74.8) | 24.1 (75.4) | 24.0 (75.2) | 23.5 (74.3) | 23.0 (73.4) | 22.2 (72.0) | 21.7 (71.1) | 21.4 (70.5) | 21.6 (70.9) | 22.3 (72.1) | 23.0 (73.4) | 23.3 (73.9) | 22.8 (73.1) |
| Average rainfall mm (inches) | 258.3 (10.17) | 244.6 (9.63) | 273.3 (10.76) | 220.7 (8.69) | 59.5 (2.34) | 141.5 (5.57) | 118.2 (4.65) | 84.0 (3.31) | 87.7 (3.45) | 143.4 (5.65) | 131.0 (5.16) | 143.7 (5.66) | 1,905.9 (75.04) |
| Average rainy days (≥ 0.2 mm) | 17 | 17 | 19 | 18 | 16 | 13 | 13 | 12 | 10 | 12 | 11 | 14 | 172 |
Source: World Meteorological Organization

== Transportation ==
The town is served by Norsup Airport. There is a weekly shipping service from Port Vila (Efate) to Litzlitz (Malekula) to Luganville (Santo).

== Banking ==
The National Bank of Vanuatu (NBV) is the only bank in Lakatoro. An agent for Australia and New Zealand Banking Group has a representative in Lakatoro who acts as an agent for their GoMoney product. The agent's office is at PIM Trading, next to the Market house.

== Mobile ==
Telecom Vanuatu Limited (TVL) and Digicel (Digi) both provide mobile phone service in Lakatoro.
