= Vulaï =

Island in Vanuatu

- Location within Vanuatu

Geography
- Location: Pacific Ocean
- Coordinates: 16°33′S 167°47′E
- Archipelago: Vanuatu, Maskelyne Islands
- Highest elevation: 9 m (30 ft)
- Highest point: Mont Siop

Administration
- Vanuatu
- Province: Malampa Province

Vulaï (also Île Wulei, Île Woulei) is a small inhabited island in Malampa Province of Vanuatu in the Pacific Ocean. It is a part of the Maskelyne Islands archipelago. The island is also known as Harper Island.

== Geography ==
Vulaï lies off the southeastern coast of Malekula Island, which is the second-largest island in the nation of Vanuatu. The estimated terrain elevation above sea level is 9 metres.
