= Akhamb =

Akhamb Island
- Island
- Location in Vanuatu
- Coordinates: 16°31′07″S 167°39′07″E
- Country: Vanuatu
- Province: Malampa Province

Population (2009)
  - Total: 646
- Time zone: UTC+11 (VUT)

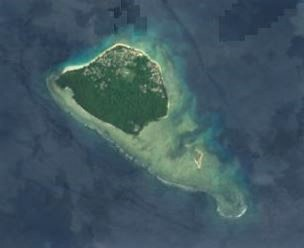

Akhamb Island is a small island just off the southcoast of Malakula in Vanuatu in the Pacific Ocean.

Akhamb has around 646 inhabitants, according to the 2009 census.
