= Arseo =

Uninhabited Pacific island

- Location within Vanuatu Location within Oceania Location within Pacific Ocean

Geography
- Location: Pacific Ocean
- Coordinates: 16°31′0″S 167°43′0″E
- Archipelago: Vanuatu
- Highest elevation: 172 m (564 ft)

Administration
- Vanuatu
- Province: Malampa Province

Demographics
- Population: 0 (2015)
- Ethnic groups: None

Arseo Island, also known as Île Faroun, is a small, uninhabited island in the Malampa Province of Vanuatu in the Pacific Ocean. The estimated terrain elevation above sea level is some 172 metres (564 ft). There are two small neighboring islands: Leumanang and Varo.

== Population ==
As of 1999, the official local population was 290. However, as of 2009, the island was fully depopulated.
