= Maskelyne =

Maskelyne may refer to:

== People ==
- Nevil Maskelyne (MP) (1611–1679), English landowner, MP for Cricklade
- Nevil Maskelyne (1732–1811), the fifth British Astronomer Royal
- Nevil Story Maskelyne (1823–1911), English geologist, MP for Cricklade
- Nevill Maskelyne Smyth (1868–1941), British Army office, recipient of the Victoria Cross
- Ryan Maskelyne (born 1999), Australian-born Papua New Guinean Olympic swimmer
- The Maskelyne family of British magicians:
  - John Nevil Maskelyne (1829–1917), stage magician
  - Nevil Maskelyne (magician) (1863–1924), son of John Nevil
  - Jasper Maskelyne (1902–1973), stage magician in the 1930s and 1940s, son of Nevil

== Other uses ==
- Maskelyne (crater), a solitary lunar crater
- Maskelynes Islands, in Vanuatu
  - Maskelynes language
- Maskelyne Passage, Antarctica
