= Aore Adventist Academy =

Secondary school in Aore, Vanuatu

- Aore; Vanuatu

Information
- School type: Private, Co-educational, Boarding school
- Motto: Nothing Without Labor!
- Denomination: Seventh-day Adventist
- Established: 1974
- Area trustee: Australasian Conference Association Limited
- President: Nos Terry Mailalong
- Dean: Allan Martin (Boys); Lynnette Martin (Girls)
- Administrator: Eliu Luen
- Principal: Gilrick Joshua
- Chaplain: David George
- Teaching staff: 14
- Gender: Mixed
- Slogan: Aore My Home!
- Song: Aore My Home
- Nickname: AAA (Triple A)
- Accreditation: Adventist Accrediting Association
- Website: aore.edu.vu

Aore Adventist Academy is a coeducational Christian secondary school in Aore, Vanuatu. It first opened in 1927 as 'New Hebrides Training School.' Its educational status varied over the decades. In 1974, the Aore School was upgraded to that of a high school, and was renamed Aore Adventist High School. It was previously Parker Missionary School. In 1994, the school's board changed the name to Aore Adventist Academy.

In 2009, the school's enrolment totalled 194 students and 17 teachers.

== Location ==
Aore Adventist Academy is situated on the southern coast of the island of Aore. Aore is part of the nation of Vanuatu, an archipelago in the South Pacific Ocean. It is some 1,750 kilometres (1,090 mi) east of northern Australia, 500 kilometres (310 mi) northeast of New Caledonia, west of Fiji, and southeast of the Solomon Islands, near New Guinea. Vanuatu was known as the New Hebrides before achieving independence.

The school buildings are located near the shoreline close to workshops, a hospital (now reassigned to other uses) and a slipway.

== History ==
=== Training school beginnings ===
In 1925, the small island of Aore was chosen as the regional Adventist mission station. A fund raising campaign began. The 8 March 1926 edition of the Australasian Record included the following poem reminding the division's sabbath schools of the project's offering at the end of the month.

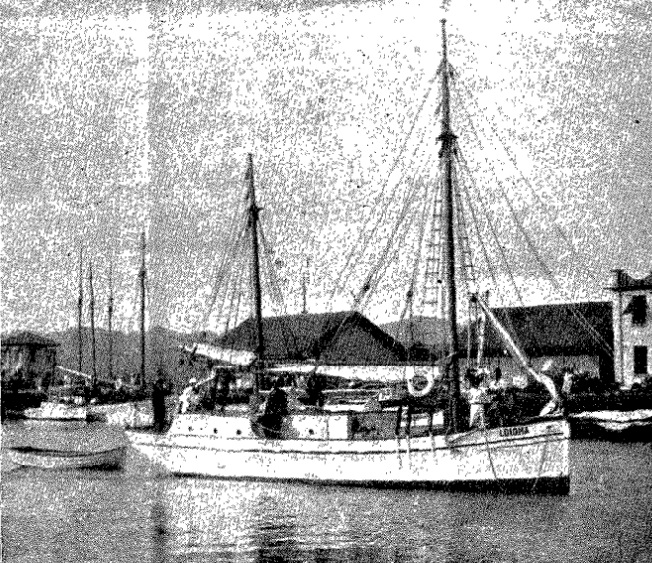
Adventist mission boat, 1926, Loloma, had its home port at the Aore school.

In 1927, the church secured the property on Aore. In the early years of the school, a clear title to the land was difficult to establish. A sawmill was built. The newly acquired regional mission boat, Loloma, located there as well. They used the Loloma to bring the students to the school. Aore soon became the focal point of Adventist work in the New Hebrides. Pastor J. R. James, the mission superintendent, and a party of young New Hebrideans moved in with axes to clear the land and establish a school. Students have followed in increasing numbers, and the educational and spiritual work of this institution has been the heart of the New Hebrides (now Vanuatu) Adventist Mission.

=== World War II and after ===
The war came to the New Hebrides. The United States arrived and took control before the Japanese could do so. On the island of Espiritu Santo, 100,000 troops arrived. The native population "were astounded at the apparent equality with which black and white military personnel were treated. When they went to work for the Americans, they received respect and wages far in excess to anything they had ever experienced before. The typically generous Americans would also look at the native New Hebridean living conditions and give them clothes and beds, ice boxes and furniture."

Two years before, the Australasian Adventist leadership prepared an evacuation plan. In 1942, Aore Training School closed. The non-native workers returned to Australia. Native leaders attended to the church's mission in their absence. They carefully maintained church property and led in the Sabbath services. When the missionaries returned they were impressed with the level of competence these native leaders demonstrated. In 1943, the school reopened.

In 1951, the mission council decided to move its headquarters to Sarakata, in Luganville on the adjacent island of Espiritu Santo. This allowed room for the school to expand. The mission headquarters was later relocated to Port Vila in 1983, following the transition to Vanuatu's independence in 1980.

=== 1980, the nation of Vanuatu ===
Vanuatu achieved independence from the condominium rule of the United Kingdom and France in 1980. By this time, the demographics and transportation routes had changed. When compared to the cost of public transportation, the Adventist mission boat, Pacifique, was considered too expensive to operate. Apart from the school, Aore ceased to hold a prominent place in the Vanuatu Adventist mission.

== See also ==
- Condominium
- List of Seventh-day Adventist secondary schools
- New Hebrides
- John Williams
