= Paama =

Island in Vanuatu

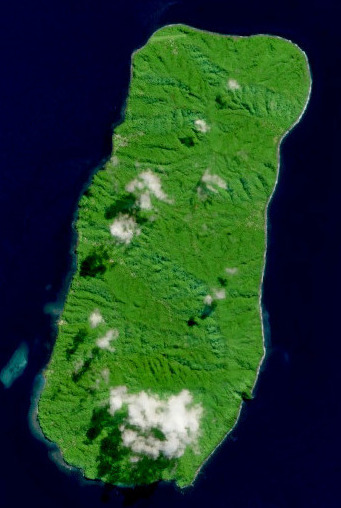

- Location within Vanuatu

Geography
- Location: Pacific Ocean
- Coordinates: 16°25′55″S 168°14′08″E
- Archipelago: New Hebrides
- Area: 32.3 km^{2} (12.5 sq mi)

Administration
- Vanuatu
- Province: Malampa

Demographics
- Population: 1,627 (2009)
- Ethnic groups: Ni-Vanuatu

Paama (Paama language: Voum) is a small island in Malampa Province, Vanuatu.

The island is about 8 km from north to south and only 5 km or so at its widest point. The island is dominated by hills, rising to a height of around 550 m in the north.

Paama lies a short distance south of Ambrym, a little further east of Malakula, about 7 km west of the large active volcano Lopevi (Ulvae, in the vernacular (see Crowley 1982), and a short distance north of the island of Epi. During daylight, all of Paama's neighbouring islands are clearly visible from various locations on the island. Indeed, on a clear night, the red glow of Ambrym's twin volcanos can be seen clearly from the black sand beach at Liro. The now uninhabited island of Lopevi dominates the view east from the village of Lulep, on the northeast coast of the island. This active volcano is reasonably regular, erupting every two years or so, causing quite serious problems for those living in the villages of Lulep and Luli in the northeast of the island. The acidic volcanic ash falls onto gardens, ruining crops, and onto the natangura thatched roofs, rotting them.

== Population ==
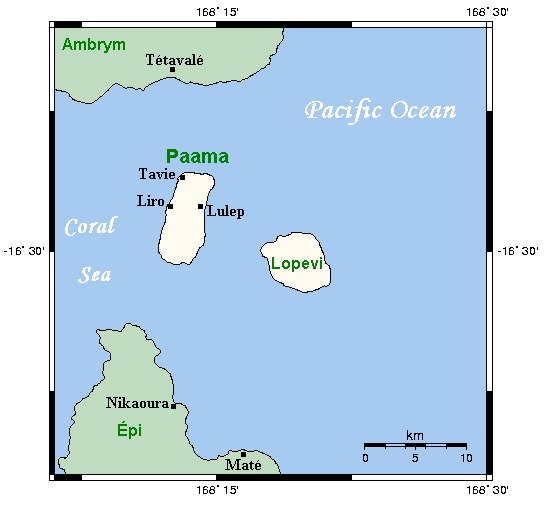

Today, the majority of people living on Paama live in villages close to the coast of the island and make their gardens on the hillsides nearby. Agricultural produce is by and large for subsistence although some is exported for sale in Port Vila (Vanuatu's capital on Éfaté) and Luganville (on Espiritu Santo).

Liro, the island's council and administrative centre is the most heavily populated village on the island. The council building, standing a hundred or so metres up from the shore, is said to have been the house of the Rev. Maurice Frater, the Presbyterian missionary resident on the island in the early 1900s. Frater arrived on the island in 1900, when outsiders were treated with great hostility, and stayed for 39 years, building 21 churches and converting the majority of the population to Christianity.

Today the island's population rests at around 1,600, with the vast majority dwelling on the west coast of the island. However, the number of people claiming to be Paamese is much greater than this. Around 7,000 people living throughout Vanuatu claimed to be Paamese in the 1999 census. Indeed, Paama has the highest outmigration rate of any of Vanuatu's 83 or so islands

== Language ==
The inhabitants speak the Paama language, termed Paamese by the linguist Terry Crowley, though the residents have no term for the language themselves. It is an East Vanuatu language, a close cognate of the Southeast Ambrym language. However, they are not so close that all speakers of one understand speakers of the other. In addition to speaking Paamese, the majority of Paamese people also speak Bislama, one of the three national languages of Vanuatu.

== Transportation ==
In the northern part of the island there is the grass strip of Paama Airport, based at the village of Tavie. Landing and taking off from this airport is not for the faint-hearted – it is one of the shortest airstrips in the whole of Vanuatu.
