= Maskelyne Islands =

- Archipelago
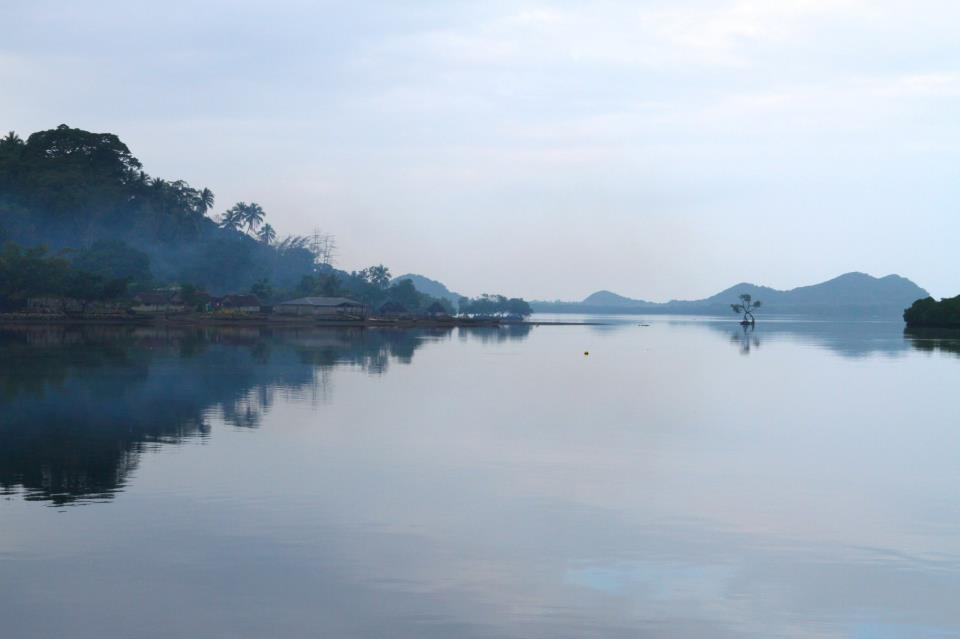
- Maskelynes anchorage

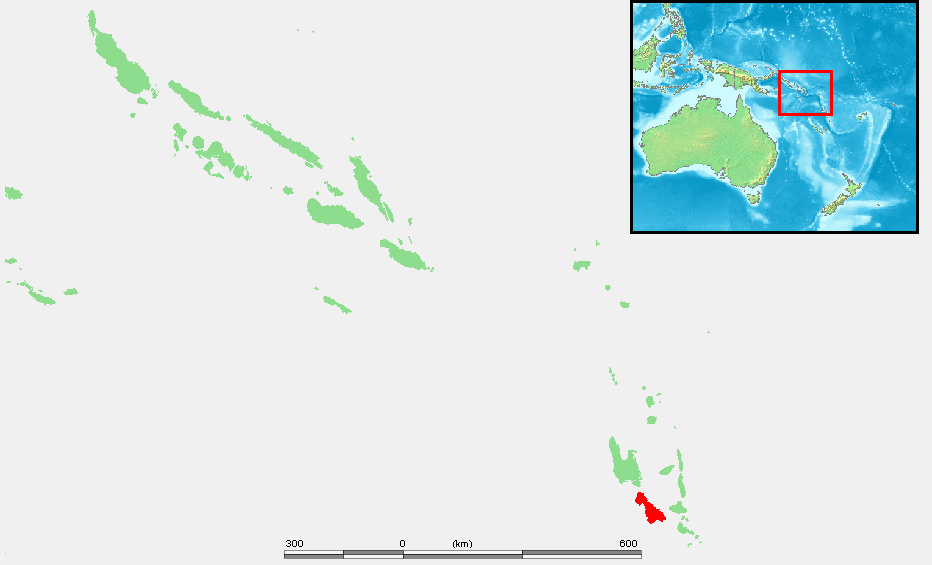
- Location of Malakula within Vanuatu
- Coordinates: 16°30′S 167°50′E
- Country: Vanuatu
- Province: Malampa Province

Population (2009)
  - Total: 1,022
- Time zone: UTC+11 (VUT)

The Maskelyne Islands, often abbreviated as the Maskelynes, are a small chain of low islands that forms part of Vanuatu in the Pacific Ocean. Among the islands are Awei, Avock, Leumanang, Uluveo, and Vulai. Uluveo (also called Maskelyne) is the main island in the group and has three villages.

The islands lie at the southeastern end of Malakula, which is the second-largest island in the nation of Vanuatu. They were named by Captain Cook after the Astronomer Royal Nevil Maskelyne as he sailed north from Port Resolution on Tanna in HMS Resolution in late 1774.

== Population ==
The Maskelyne islands are relatively well-inhabited (1,022 by 2009). which is considered to have historical reasons in part that life on the islands provided protection from attacks by mainland tribes which were not good seafarers, and thus had trouble reaching the island chain. However, the island chain also went through a variety of cycles of population and depopulation (causes not given in reference).

== Economy and services ==
The area is rich with fish and sharks, and Lonely Planet describes the Maskelynes as 'just gorgeous' and recommends them for snorkelling and diving opportunities—though warning of strong currents between the islands. However, as of the late 2000s, there was little tourism in the area, being a very remote part of Vanuatu.

The islands have very little modern infrastructure, even for the local Pacific island environment, though the Vanuatu government and various aid agencies have cooperated with locals to assist some smaller local schools and health facilities.
