= Tomman =

- Island
- Location in Vanuatu
- Coordinates: 16°35′37″S 167°27′17″E
- Country: Vanuatu
- Province: Malampa Province

Population (2009)
  - Total: 253
- Time zone: UTC+11 (VUT)

Tomman is a small island just off the southwest coast of Malakula in Vanuatu in the Pacific Ocean.

It has around 250 inhabitants, according to the 2009 census.
