= Malokilikili =

Island in Vanuatu

- Interactive map of Malokilikili

Geography
- Location: Pacific Ocean
- Coordinates: 15°44′S 167°15′E
- Archipelago: Vanuatu

Administration
- Vanuatu
- Province: Sanma Province
- Largest settlement: Sola

Demographics
- Population: 12 (2015)

Malokilikili Island is an inhabited island in Sanma Province of Vanuatu in the Pacific Ocean. Malokilikili lies off the eastern coast of Malo Island.

== Population ==
As of 2015, the official local population is 12 people in two households.
