= Leneu =

Island in Torba Province, Vanuatu

- Interactive map of Leneu

Geography
- Location: Pacific Ocean
- Coordinates: 13.879°S 167.598°E
- Archipelago: Vanuatu

Administration
- Vanuatu
- Province: Torba Province

Demographics
- Population: 0 (2015)

Leneu is a small uninhabited island in Torba Province of Vanuatu in the Pacific Ocean. Leneu lies close to Sola on Vanua Lava and is a part of Banks Islands archipelago.

== Name ==
The name Leneu comes from the Mota language.
