= Kwakéa =

- Island
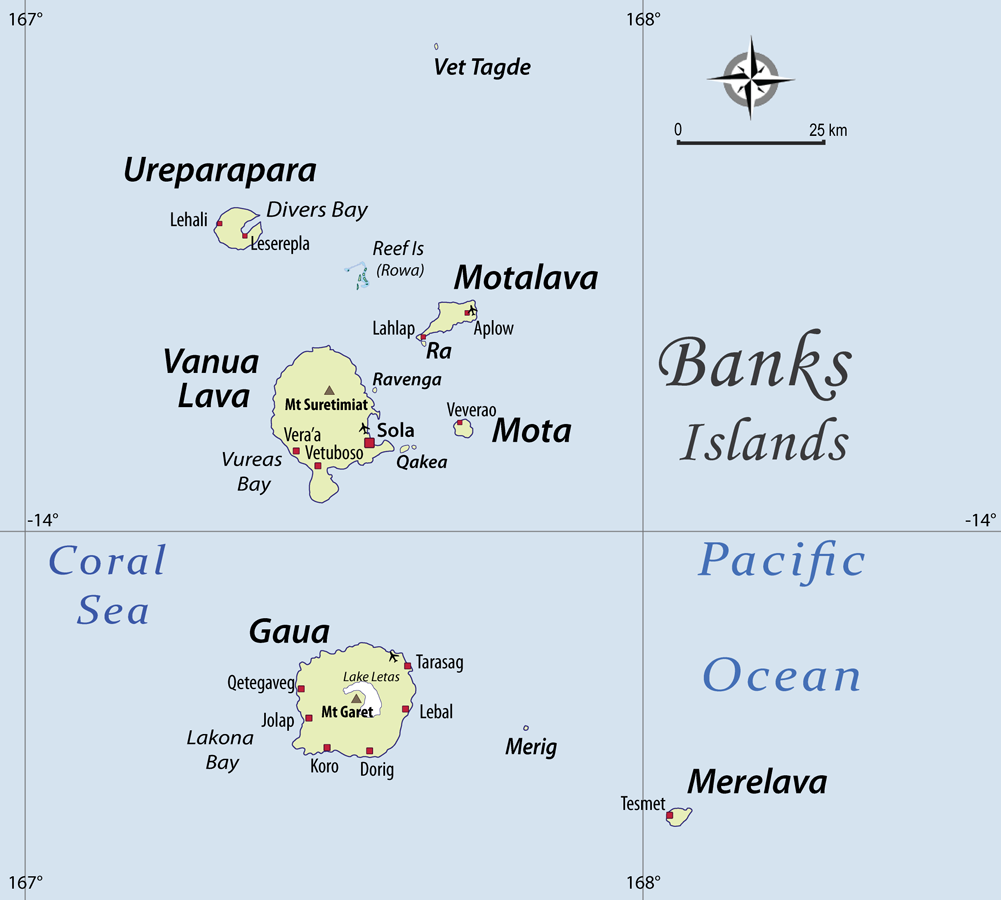
- Location of Kwakéa (Qakea) off Vanua Lava in Banks Islands

- Location in Vanuatu
- Coordinates: 13°52′59″S 167°35′59″E
- Country: Vanuatu
- Province: Torba Province

Area
  - Total: 1 km^{2} (0.39 sq mi)

Population (2023)
  - Total: 8
  - Density: 8.0/km^{2} (21/sq mi)
- Time zone: UTC+11 (VUT)

Kwakéa (or Pakea, or Qakea [k͡pʷakea]) is an islet located east of Vanua Lava in the Banks Islands, Vanuatu. It has a population of 8 people.

== Name ==
The spellings Kwakéa (or Kwakea) and Pakea represent two different attempts at transcribing the form [k͡pʷakea], which is the island's name in the Mota language. This form is rendered as Qakea in Mota's orthography.

The same island is known under slightly different names in the vernacular languages of the region: Qakē ([k͡pʷaˈkɪ]) in Vurës; Qeke ([k͡pʷɛˈkɛ]) in Mwesen; Aqke ([ak͡pʷˈkɛ]) in Mwotlap.

All of these names can be derived from a form *ᵐbʷaᵑgea in Proto-Torres-Banks.

== Geography ==
The island of Kwakéa has a monsoon climate. The average daily temperature is 26 °C. The warmest month is March with a daily average of (27.5 °C), and the coldest month is August with a daily average of (22.8 °C). The average annual rainfall is 240.67 millimeters.

The channel that flows between Kwakea and Vanua Lava is known as Dudley Channel. Islet Nawila lies 100 m east of Kwakéa.

== History ==
The islet was once settled by migrants from nearby Mota.

In addition, the anthropologist Robert Codrington spoke of an earlier migration of Polynesians from Tonga sometime during the first half of the 19th century, around 50 years before he wrote his work on Melanesian languages in 1885. However, they were forced to leave after a series of quarrels with the native Melanesians and when they tried to return a year later, they were attacked and driven off.

In the mid-1890s, English settlers Frank and Alice Whitford purchased the island from the native title owners, who were from Mota. The Whitfords created coconut plantations, and lived on the island until the mid 1940’s. The Whitfield family cemetery remains on the island till today.

The island is now owned by the Kerr family, who renewed the lease with the traditional custodian owners in 2008. It has been developed into a private island resort for tourism.
