= Lopevi =

Island in Vanuatu

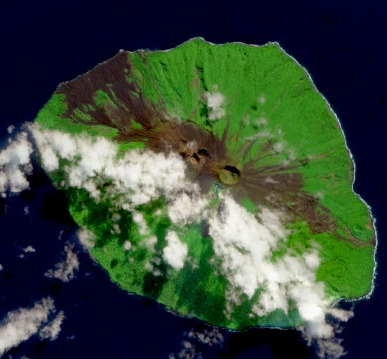
- A satellite image of the island.

Highest point
- Elevation: 1,413 m (4,636 ft)
- Prominence: 1,413 m (4,636 ft)
- Listing: Ribu
- Coordinates: 16°30′24″S 168°20′45″E

Geography
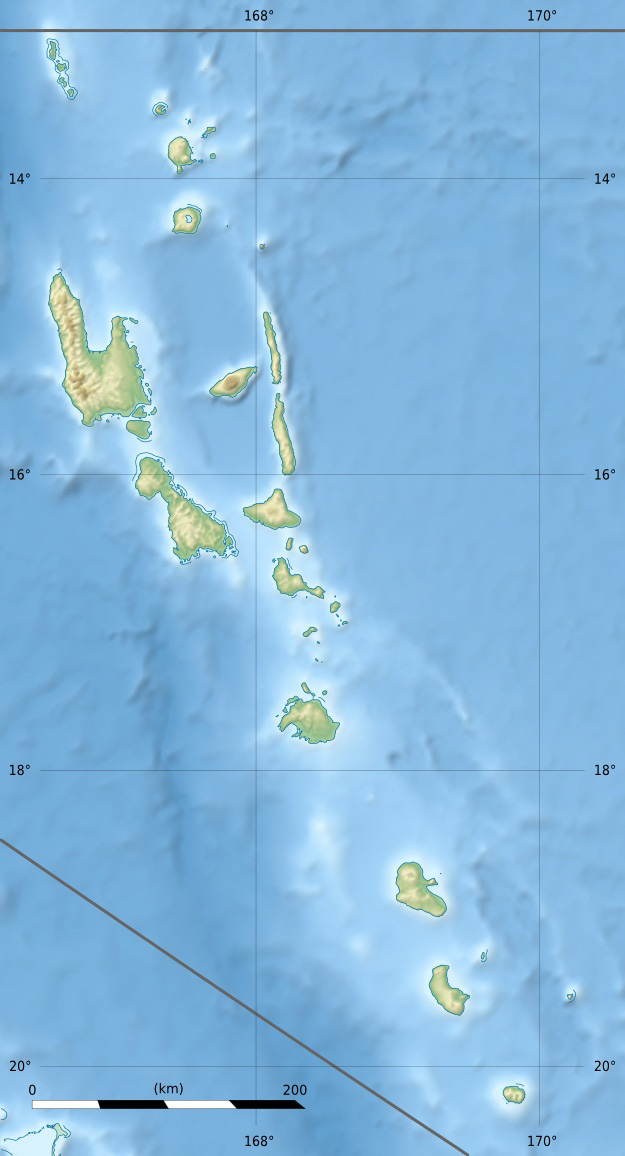
- Location within Vanuatu
- Location: Vanuatu

Geology
- Mountain type: Stratovolcano
- Last eruption: April to May 2007

Lopevi (or Lopévi) is an uninhabited island in Malampa Province, Vanuatu. It lies to the southeast of Ambrym and east of Paama.

== Geography ==
Lopevi consists of the 7-km-wide cone of the active stratovolcano by the same name. It reaches a peak of 1413 m above sea level, the tallest point in central Vanuatu. It has erupted at least 22 times since 1862. The island was formerly inhabited, but in 1960 the population moved to nearby Paama or Epi because of the recurrent danger.

Lopevi is on the New Hebrides Plate, where it lies above the subducted Australian Plate to the west. Because there are no earthquakes between 50 and 200 km below the Earth's surface, it is thought that the subducted plate has fractured, and does not appear between these depths.

== Recent activity ==
As of October 2025, a new eruptive cycle looks likely in the coming years. On the "Smithsonian / USGS Weekly Volcanic Activity Report for 24 September-30 September 2025 (Continuing Activity)", it was reported that volcanic unrest is ongoing at Lopevi. Low-level thermal anomalies were identified in satellite images during September 12-13, and again on 17 September. Small fumarolic steam plumes were continuously emitted from the summit crater on 22 September based on webcam images.
