= Uri (island) =

Island in Vanuatu

Geography
- Location: Pacific Ocean
- Coordinates: 16°05′23.6″S 167°27′17.6″E

Administration
- Vanuatu
- Capital city: Port Vila

Demographics
- Languages: Bislama; English; French

Uri is a small island located near Malakula, in the Malampa Province of Vanuatu in the Pacific Ocean.
