= Malotina =

Island in Vanuatu

- Interactive map of Malotina

Geography
- Location: Pacific Ocean
- Coordinates: 15°43′00″S 167°15′00″E
- Archipelago: Vanuatu
- Highest elevation: 213 m (699 ft)

Administration
- Vanuatu
- Province: Sanma Province

Demographics
- Population: 0 (2015)
- Ethnic groups: None

Malotina (also North Malo Killi Killi, Ile Malo Killi Killi du Nord, Île Malotina) is a small uninhabited island in Sanma Province of Vanuatu in the Pacific Ocean.

== Geography ==
Malotina lies off the eastern coast of Malo Island.
