= Vao (island) =

Island in Vanuatu

- Location within Vanuatu

Geography
- Location: Pacific Ocean
- Coordinates: 15°53′51″S 167°18′33″E
- Area: 1.26 km^{2} (0.49 sq mi)
- Length: 1.66 km (1.031 mi)
- Width: 1.11 km (0.69 mi)
- Coastline: 4.22 km (2.622 mi)

Administration
- Vanuatu
- Province: Malampa Province

Demographics
- Population: 898 (2009)
- Pop. density: 753.9/km^{2} (1952.6/sq mi)

Additional information
- Time zone: VUT (UTC+11)

Vao is an islet off the north-eastern coast of Malakula in Vanuatu in the Pacific Ocean. The 1999 census showed a population of 667, which increased in 2009 to 898.

The Vao language is spoken on the island.
