= Nawila =

Uninhabited island in Torba Province, Vanuatu

[name]: Ngéré Néwet
- Interactive map of Nawila

Geography
- Location: Pacific Ocean
- Coordinates: 13°53′S 167°37′E
- Archipelago: Vanuatu

Administration
- Vanuatu
- Province: Torba Province

Demographics
- Population: 0 (2015)
- Ethnic groups: None

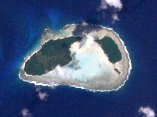
Kwakea and Nawila

Nawila (also Ngéré Néwet, Nawila, Île Nowéla, Île Nivoula, Île Niwula Pulo) is a small uninhabited island in Torba Province of Vanuatu in the Pacific Ocean.

== Geography ==
Nawila lies 500 m east of Kwakéa in the Banks Islands archipelago. The island is part of a three-island group on an atoll 3.2 km long and 1.9 km wide. There is a small vegetated islet 150 m south of Nawila.
