= South West Bay Airport =

Airport in Southwest Bay, Vanuatu

- IATA: SWJ; ICAO: NVSX

Summary
- Airport type: Public
- Serves: Wintua, Malakula, Vanuatu
- Location: Southwest Bay
- Elevation AMSL: 23 ft / 7 m
- Coordinates: 16°29′1.54″S 167°26′43.75″E

Map
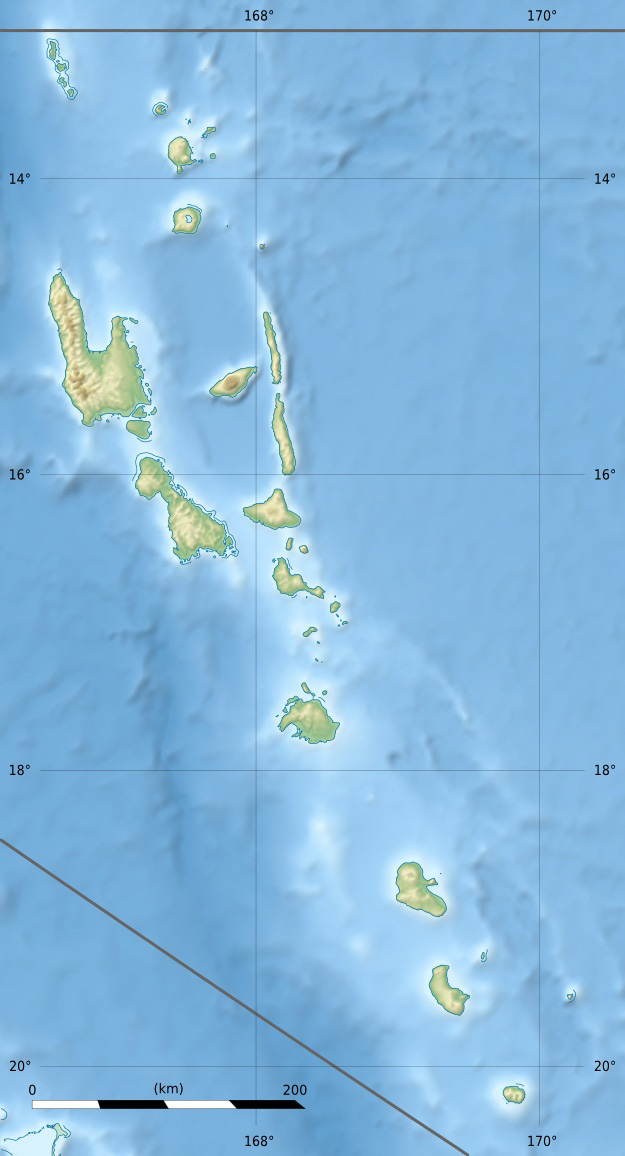
- Location of airport in Vanuatu

Runways
| Direction | Length | | Surface |
| Direction | m | ft | Surface |
|---|---|---|---|
| 14/32 | 815 | 2,674 | Gras |

South West Bay Airport is an airport in South West Bay, Malakula, Vanuatu (IATA: SWJ, ICAO: NVSX).
