= Sakao (Malampa, Vanuatu) =

- Island
- Location in Vanuatu
- Coordinates: 16°30′0″S 167°48′59″E
- Country: Vanuatu
- Province: Sanma Province

Population (2009)
  - Total: 14
- Time zone: UTC+11 (VUT)

Sakao, also known as Khoti, is an island in Vanuatu, located off the southeastern shore of Vanuatu's second-largest island, Malakula, in Malampa Province.

The island is about 3 km wide and 0.8 km long..

== See also ==
- List of islands of Vanuatu
