= Aore =

- Island
- Location in Vanuatu
- Coordinates: 15°34′20″S 167°11′51″E
- Country: Vanuatu
- Province: Sanma Province

Area
  - Total: 57.6 km^{2} (22.2 sq mi)
- Highest elevation: 122 m (400 ft)

Population (2009)
  - Total: 556
  - Density: 9.65/km^{2} (25.0/sq mi)
- Time zone: UTC+11 (VUT)

Aore is an island in Sanma Province, Vanuatu. It is located opposite Luganville on Espiritu Santo and has an area of 58 square kilometres (22 sq mi). The estimated terrain elevation above sea level is some 89 metres (292 ft).

Aore's climate is humid tropical. The average annual rainfall is about 3,000 millimetres (120 in). The island is subject to frequent cyclones and earthquakes. Large colonies of bats occupy the island's many caves.

The Aore language is spoken on the island.

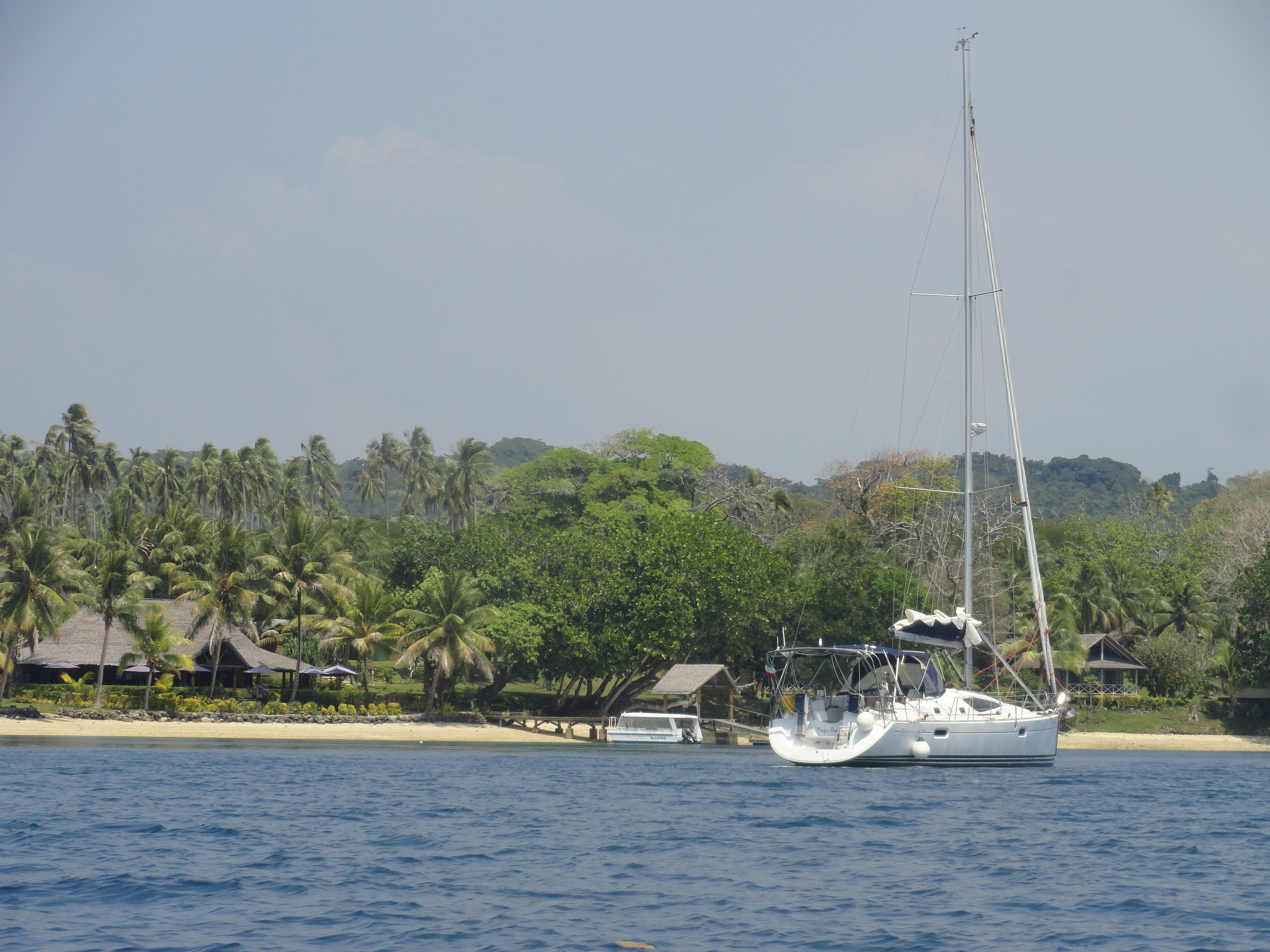
Aore Island Resort

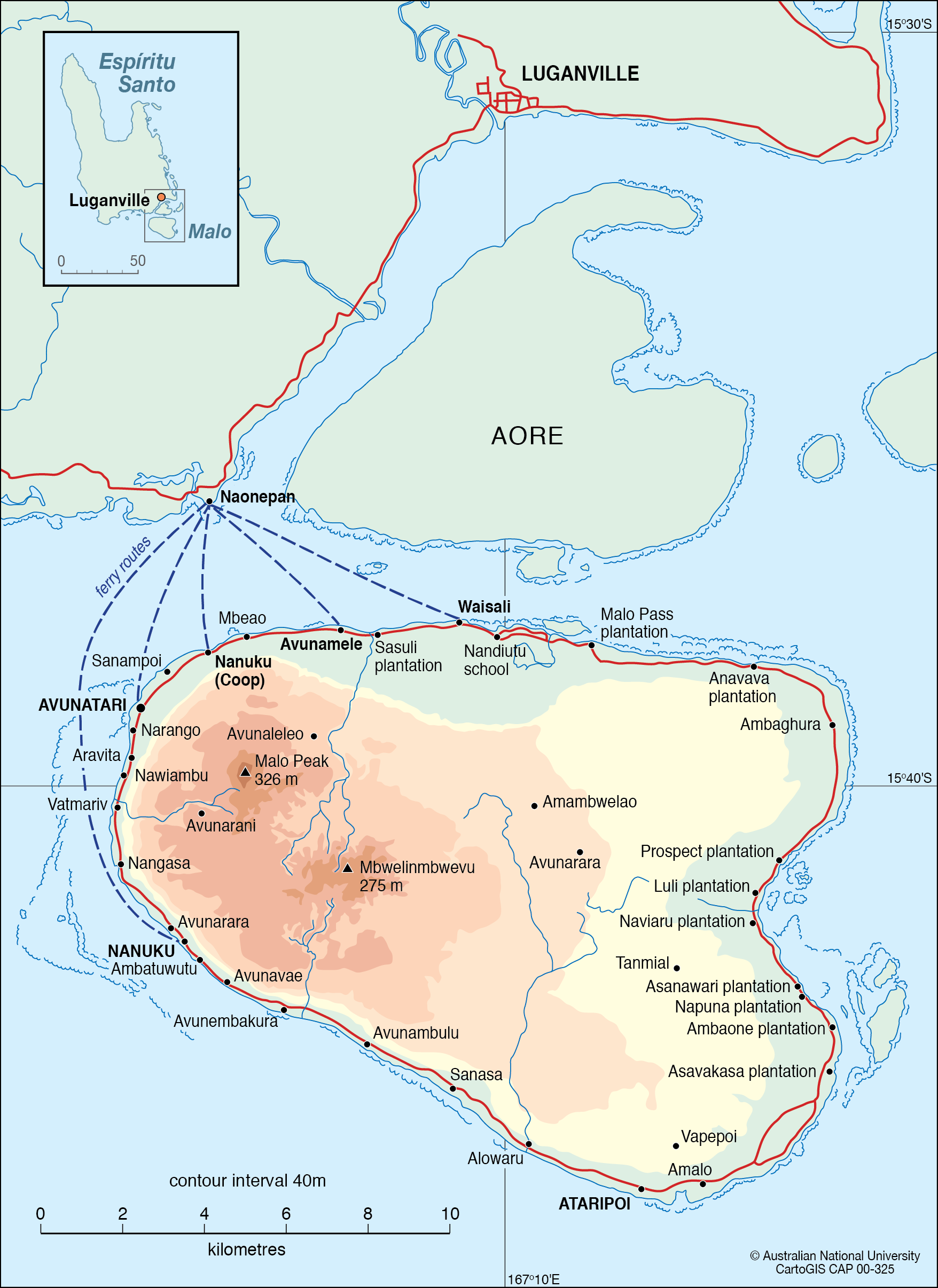
Aore is located between Malo and Espiritu Santo

== Economy and tourism ==
Tourism and plantations are Aore's main providers of employment and economic revenue. There are numerous resorts on the island catering to tourists, weddings, and baptisms. Aore is a base for wreck and reef diving; wrecks accessible to divers include those of SS President Coolidge, USS Tucker, and MV Henri Bonneaud. Recreational fishing is a year-round activity.

The island also supports small-scale cocoa, vanilla, and pepper plantations, contributing to its agricultural economy.

== Religion ==
The Seventh-day Adventist Church has been active on Aore since the early 20th century, and operates a co-educational boarding secondary school, Aore Adventist Academy, located on the mid-south coast of the island. Youth With A Mission (YWAM) has a base on the southwest side of Aore.
