= Avock =

Island in Vanuatu

Avokh Island
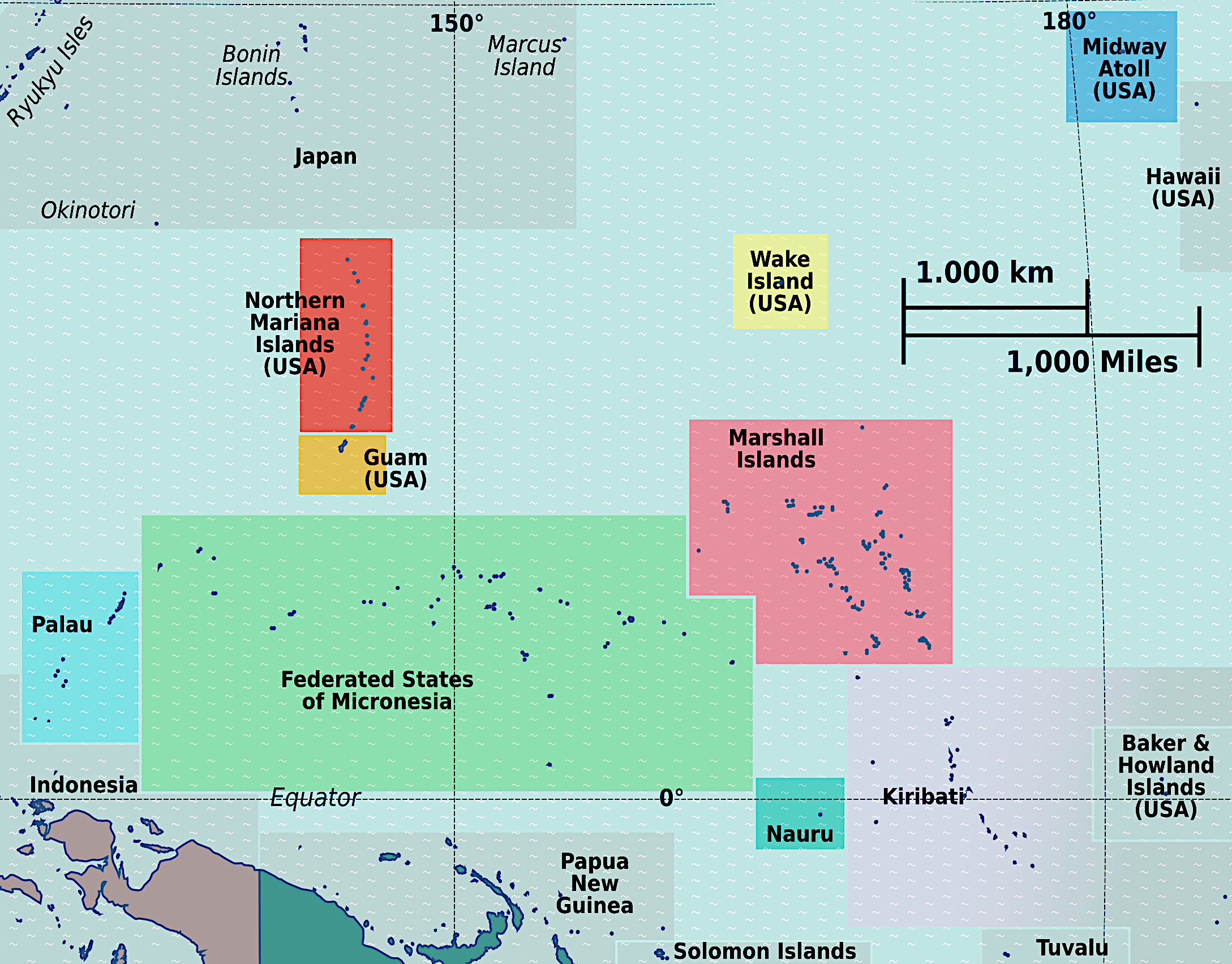
- Location within Vanuatu Location within Micronesia Location within Oceania Location within Pacific Ocean

Geography
- Location: Pacific Ocean
- Coordinates: 16°32′00″S 167°46′00″E
- Archipelago: Vanuatu
- Highest elevation: 166 m (545 ft)

Administration
- Vanuatu
- Province: Malampa Province

Demographics
- Population: 189 (2015)
- Ethnic groups: None

Avock Island or Avokh Island is an inhabited island in Malampa Province of Vanuatu in the Pacific Ocean. The estimated terrain elevation above the sea level is some 166 meters.

== Population ==
As of 2015, the official population of the island was 189 in 49 households.
