= National Bank of Vanuatu =

Bank of Vanuatu

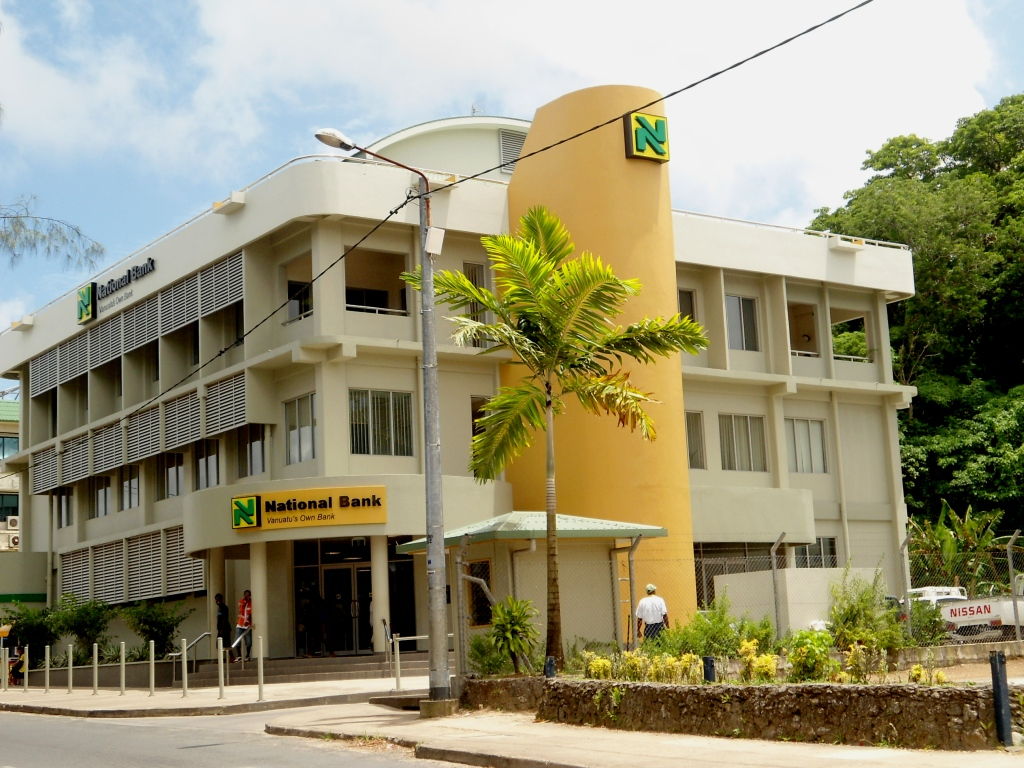
- Industry: Banking
- Headquarters: Port Vila, Vanuatu
- Owners: Vanuatu National Provident Fund (56.03%); Government of Vanuatu (36.21%); International Finance Corporation (7.76%)
- Number of employees: 306
- Website: www.nbv.vu

The National Bank of Vanuatu is the largest bank in Vanuatu. It has 29 branches and agencies across the country, and is the only commercial bank with branches outside the largest cities.
