= Wala (island) =

Island in Vanuatu

- Location within Vanuatu

Geography
- Location: Pacific Ocean
- Coordinates: 15.973092°S 167.376944°E
- Area: 777,979.07 m^{2} (8,374,097.0 sq ft)
- Length: 1.24 km (0.771 mi)
- Width: 915.87 m (3004.82 ft)
- Coastline: 3.32 km (2.063 mi)

Administration
- Vanuatu
- Province: Malampa Province

Demographics
- Population: 270 (2009)

Additional information
- Time zone: VUT (Vanuatu Time) (UTC+11:00)

Wala is an inhabited islet off the north-eastern coast of Malakula in Vanuatu in the Pacific Ocean. The 1999 census showed a population of 201, which increased in 2009 to 270. Cruise ships anchor off-shore and passengers visit the Wala by the ship's tender.
