= Atchin =

Island in Vanuatu

- Location within Vanuatu

Geography
- Location: Pacific Ocean
- Coordinates: 15.942223°S 167.342493°E
- Area: 729,947.07 m^{2} (7,857,084.9 sq ft)
- Length: 1.37 km (0.851 mi)
- Width: 689.83 m (2263.22 ft)
- Coastline: 3.44 km (2.138 mi)

Administration
- Vanuatu
- Province: Malampa Province

Demographics
- Population: 724 (2015)
- Pop. density: 1,037.9/km^{2} (2688.1/sq mi)

Additional information
- Time zone: VUT (UTC+11)

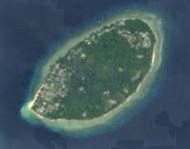
Atchin Island, Vanuatu

Atchin is an islet off the north-eastern coast of Malakula in Vanuatu. The 1999 census showed a population of 761, which had decreased to 738 by 2009. According to the 2015 census, the population had further decreased to 724, residing in 158 households.

The island gives its name to the Atchin language spoken on the island.
