= Rano Island =

Island in Malampa, Vanuatu

Rano
- Location within Vanuatu

Geography
- Location: Pacific Ocean
- Coordinates: 15.987002°S 167.392730°E
- Area: 1.48 km^{2} (0.57 sq mi)
- Length: 1.45 km (0.901 mi)
- Width: 1.30 km (0.808 mi)
- Coastline: 4.49 km (2.79 mi)

Administration
- Vanuatu
- Province: Malampa Province

Demographics
- Population: 304 (2009)
- Pop. density: 215.6/km^{2} (558.4/sq mi)

Additional information
- Time zone: VUT (UTC+11)

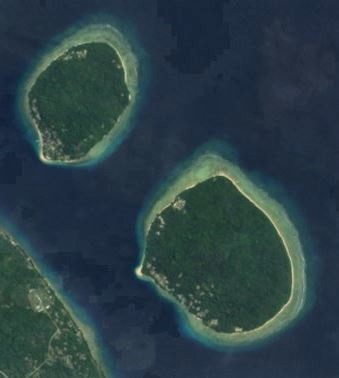
Wala Island (in the north) and Rano Island (in the south), Vanuatu

Rano is an islet off the north-eastern coast of Malakula in Vanuatu in the Pacific Ocean. The 1999 census showed a population of 273, which increased in 2009 to 304.
