= Malekula =

Island in Vanuatu

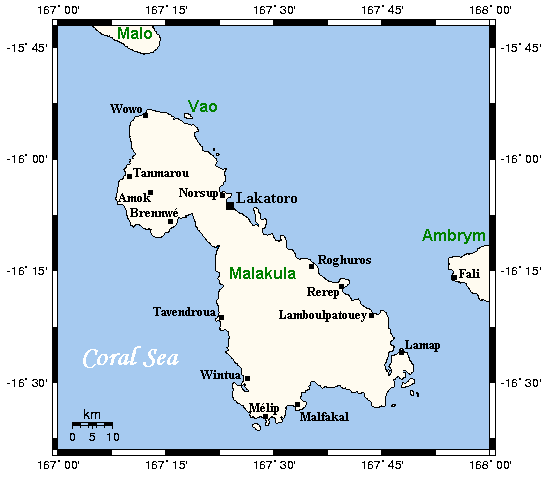

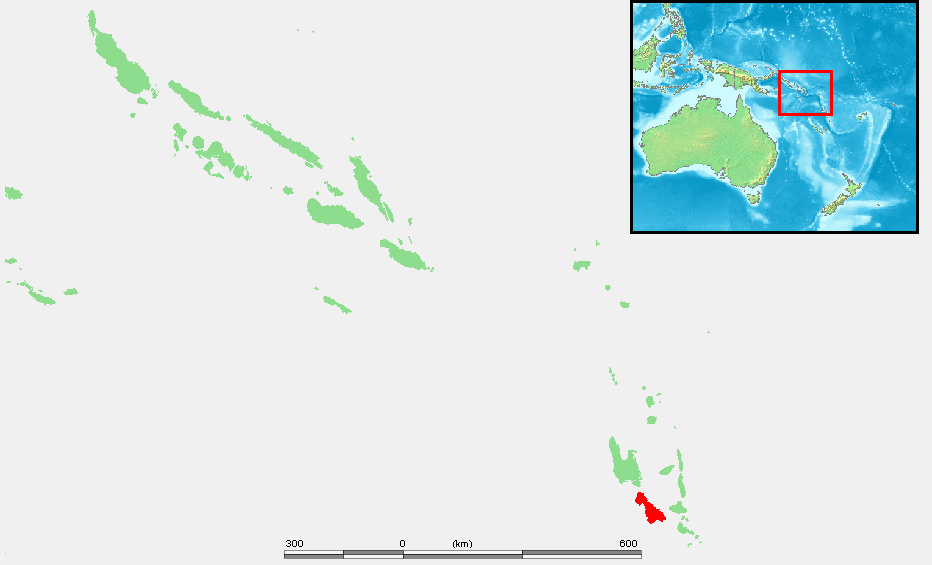
- Map with Malakula highlighted

Geography
- Location: South West Pacific Ocean
- Coordinates: 16°15′S 167°30′E
- Archipelago: New Hebrides
- Area: 2,041 km^{2} (788 sq mi)
- Highest elevation: 879 m (2884 ft)
- Highest point: Mount Liambele

Administration
- Vanuatu
- Province: Malampa
- Largest settlement: Lakatoro

Demographics
- Population: 22,934 (2009)
- Ethnic groups: Ni-Vanuatu

Malekula, also spelled Malakula or Mallicolo in French is the second-largest island in the Republic of Vanuatu, an archipelago of Melanesia in the South Pacific.

== Location ==
The northernmost tip of Malekula is separated from the islands of Malo & Espiritu Santo by the Bougainville Strait. Lakatoro, the capital of Malampa Province, is situated on its northeastern shore and is the largest settlement on the island. Just off the northeastern coast of Malakula lie a group of islands called the Small Islands, including, in order from north to south: Vao, Atchin, Wala, Rano, Norsup, Uripiv, and Uri. To the east & south-east lie Ambae, Pentecost, Ambrym & Epi, which are big islands. Close to the southernmost tip lie more small islands: Tomman to the southwest; Akhamb to the south; and the Maskelynes to the southeast (including Sakao and Uluveo).

Malakula has a maximum elevation of 879 m (2884 ft); its peak is called Mount Liambele, formerly known as Mount Pénot. The strait that separates Malekula from Malo is named for Louis Antoine de Bougainville who sailed thru the islands in 1768.

== History ==
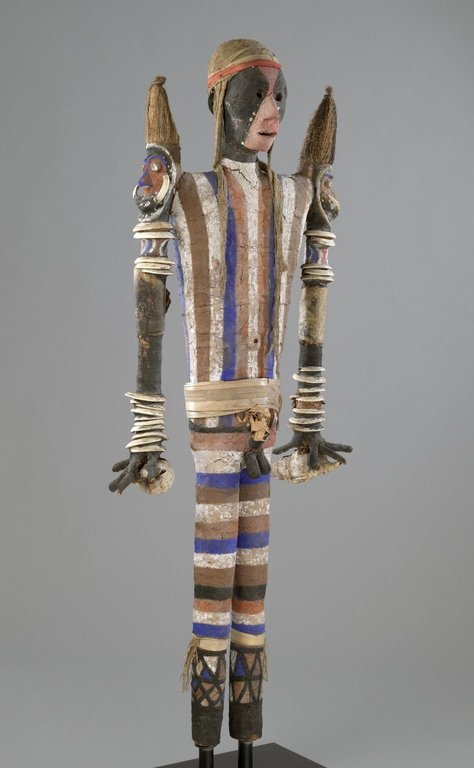
Effigy Figure (Rambaramp), before 1880. Wood, fiber, mud, pigment, bone, shell, boar's tusks. Brooklyn Museum

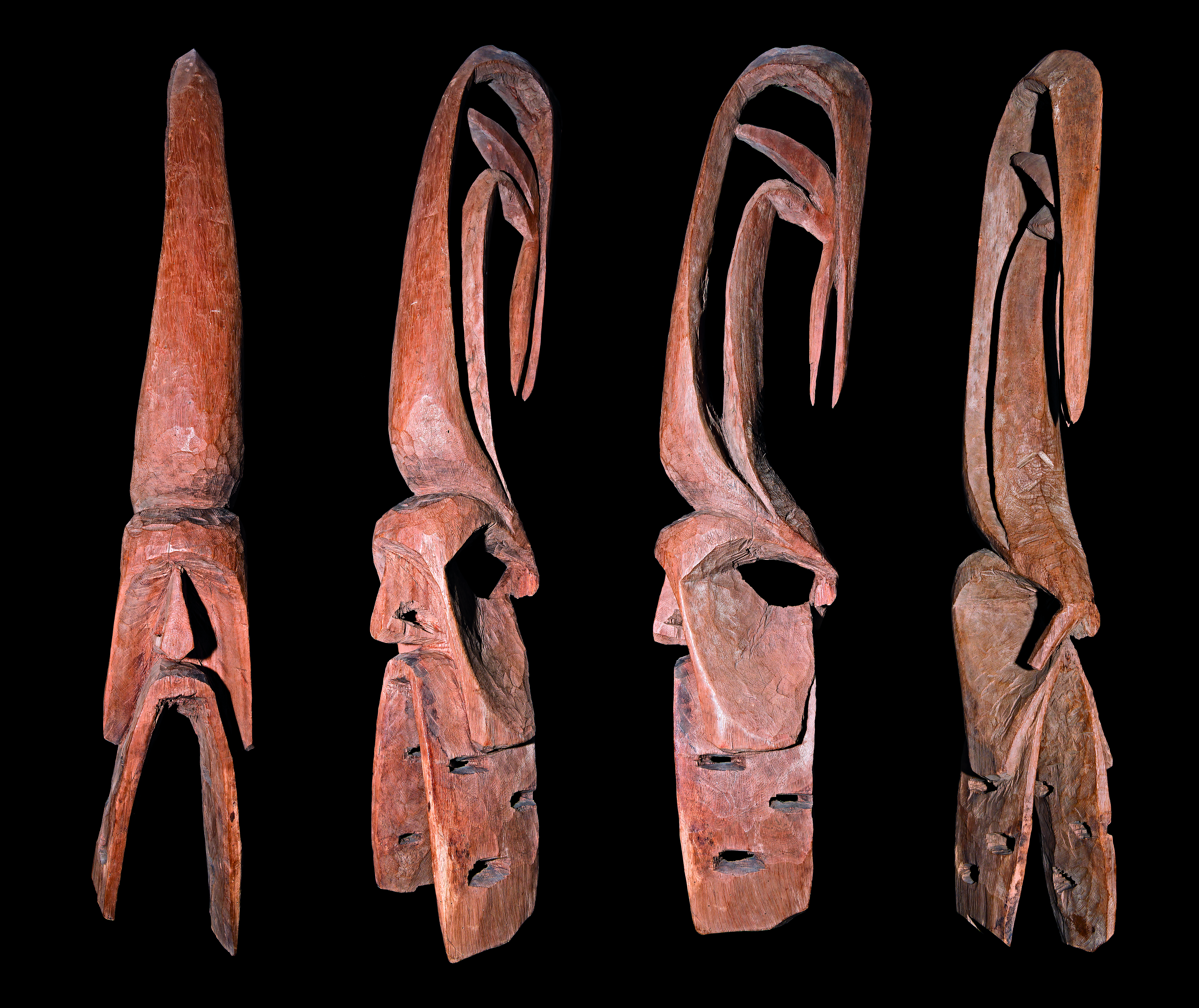
Canoe prow, Vao Island MHNT

Malekula was inhabited for thousands of years by the indigenous people before Europeans encountered it. The first Europeans to sight the island were the members of the Spanish expedition of Pedro Fernández de Quirós, in 1606.

After Bougainville in 1768 Captain James Cook, visited the island in 1774 on his second voyage to the Pacific. The islands were colonised in the late 19th century by both the British and the French, eventually becoming a condominium called in English the New Hebrides. Independence came in 1980 with the founding of the Republic of Vanuatu.

From the 1820s on the island was visited regularly by small ships gathering sandalwood, trochus, pearl shell & bêche de mer, for trade on the Chinese market. From the 1860s on Malekula became a regular source of labourers recruited for Queensland, Fiji & New Caledonia. The first missionaries & traders came at about the same time.

In 1914 and 1915, the British anthropologist John Layard lived on Malakula, doing anthropological fieldwork, taking notes, making phonographic records, and taking more than 400 photographs. When he returned to Britain, he donated copies of his photographs on plates to the Museum of Archaeology and Anthropology, at Cambridge.

In 2002 the German painter Ingo Kühl, after participating in an expedition of the Cultural Center to ceremonies of the indigenous people on Malakula, showed his works that were created there in an exhibition at the National Museum of Vanuatu in Port Vila and in 2004–2005 at the Ethnological Museum of Berlin.

== Demographics & languages ==
According to the 2009 census, Malekula has around 23,000 inhabitants.

=== Languages ===
Like everywhere in Vanuatu, Bislama is the main lingua franca, while French & English are also present all over the island – not just because they hark back to the colonial era but because of their role in education & government.

However, the languages spoken daily by the population of Malekula are the many languages that are indigenous to the island. A 2015 survey of Vanuatu languages thus counted as many as 42 different languages endogenous to the island, corresponding to 30% of the archipelago's linguistic diversity. This makes Malekula the most multilingual island of Vanuatu, and of Island Melanesia as a whole.

Unlike some earlier classifications, linguist and Oceanic languages specialist John Lynch (2016) considered the Malakula languages to form a coherent group.

=== Society ===
Two tribes living on Malekula have been of particular interest to anthropologists: the Big Nambas, who live in the far north of the island, and the Small Nambas, who live in the central part of the southern area. Their names refer to the size of the penis sheath worn by initiated adult males, which are made out of shredded banana or pandanus leaves & often dyed red. The sheath is wrapped around the penis & then tucked into a broad bark belt.

Until the first part of the 20th century, it was the custom among the Small Nambas to bind infants' skulls in order to permanently alter the shape of their heads. Cone-shaped skulls were considered a sign of higher social status. Similar practises have been recorded in North America & in Europe.

From 1917 to 1919 American documentary film makers Martin and Osa Johnson shot extensive footage of both the above named tribes on location. In spite of its lurid title, confused editing & an often absurd storyboard-line, the film subsequently made from their camera work Among the Cannibal Isles of the South Seas (1918) is an excellent study document. For an excerpt, see https://www.youtube.com/watch?v=OsYidvlM5VQ. Gems include 'long heads' on Tomman & Big Nambas chief Niklapat (spelt 'Nagapate' in the film).

== Economy and services ==
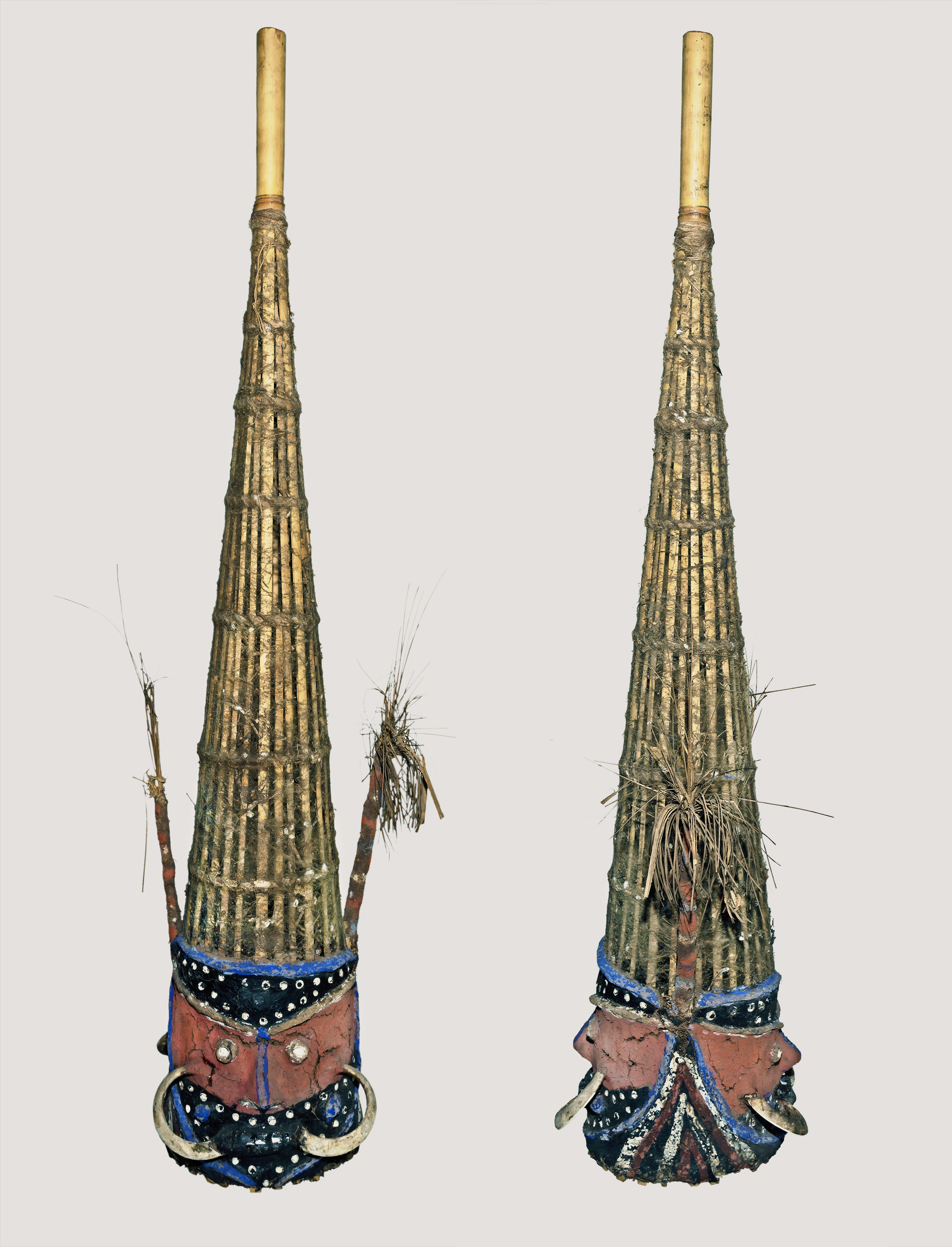
Malakula funeral masks – nineteenth century

Malakula's economy is largely based on agriculture. The island has extensive copra plantations on the eastern coastal plains. The largest copra-producing plantation in Vanuatu is at Norsup; it was originally known as PRNH (Plantations Réunies des Nouvelles-Hébrides) & is now (2026) 100 years old. In 1939, a copra cooperative was set up at Matanvat in northern Malakula. For a while it turned to cargo cult activities, but after 1950 it resumed copra production.

Both Norsup and Lakatoro have telephones and 24-hour electricity. Norsup is the site of the provincial hospital. Lakatoro has more stores than Norsup. It has a market house, a branch of the National Bank of Vanuatu, and an Air Vanuatu office. It is also the site of the island's main wharf and the administrative centre for Malampa province (which includes Malekula, Ambrym and Paama).

== Tourism ==
The interior of Malekula is mountainous, rugged, and forest-covered. It is a good place for walking and bird watching. There are old village sites hidden in the bush in many parts of Malekula. The Maskelynes and the small offshore islands along the east coast of Malekula have sand beaches as well as coral reefs that are good places for recreational snorkeling and diving. Divers & swimmers should however be wary of sharks. On the mainland there are a few white sand beaches but most are black sand, owing to volcanic activity. There are no active volcanoes on Malekula but pummice & ash drift regularly from volcanoes on nearby Ambrym & Lopévi. Visitors should be informed that the malaria-carrying anopheles mosquito is present on the island.

== Transportation ==
=== Air transport ===
There are three airports on Malekula. They are located at Norsup (in the northern part of the island), Lamap (in the southeastern part of the island), and Southwest Bay. The Norsup airport has a tarmac surface. Air Vanuatu operates daily flights to Malekula.

=== Sea transport ===
Regular ferry services operate between Port Vila & Espiritu Santo, with stops in between on Malekula https://tritonexplorers.com/big-sista-ferry-everything-you-need-to-know-about-travel-to-espiritu-santo/. Travellers can also move about on cargo & trading ships.

=== Road transport ===
Lakatoro is Malekula's road-transport hub. The best place to find trucks is at the Lakatoro Trading Centre. There are several trucks along the northeast coast as far as Vao.

== See also ==
- Maskelynes Islands
- Malekula languages

== Literature ==
- Haidy Geismar and Anita Herle: Moving images. John Layard, fieldwork and photography on Malakula since 1914, Crawford House Publishing Australia, Adelaide, South Australia, 2009 ISBN 978-1-86333-319-1
- Deacon, Bernard Malekula Anthropological Publications, Oosterhout, Netherlands 1970, edited by Camilla Wedgwood, preface by A.C. Haddon, reprint of original Routledge & Kegan Paul edition, London 1934. Compiled from the papers of Bernard Deacon who died at the age of 24 of blackwater fever at South-West Bay in 1928.
- Bregulla, Heinrich Birds of Vanuatu Anthony Nelson, Shropshire 1992 ISBN 0 90461434 4
- Docker, Edward Wybergh The Blackbirders, Angus & Robertson, Sydney 1970 ISBN 0207 14069 3
- Gardiner, Margaret Footsteps on Maleluka Salamander Press 1984

in Bislama language
John Layard long Malakula 1914–1915, Vanuatu Cultural Centre
