= Malampa Province =

Province of Vanuatu

Coordinates: 16°15′S 167°45′E

Malampa
- Province
- Flag

- Malampa in Vanuatu
- Country: Vanuatu
- Capital: Lakatoro

Area
  - Total: 2,779 km^{2} (1,073 sq mi)

Population (2016)
  - Total: 40,928
  - Density: 14.73/km^{2} (38.14/sq mi)

Malampa is one of the six provinces of Vanuatu, located in the center of the country. It consists of three main islands:

- Malakula
- Ambrym
- Paama

Malampa takes its name from the first syllable of their names, being MALakula, AMbrym, and PAama.

It includes a number of other islands – the small islands of Uripiv, Norsup, Rano, Wala, Atchin and Vao off the coast of Malakula, and the volcanic island of Lopevi (currently uninhabited). Also included are the Maskelynes Islands and some more small islands along the south coast of Malakula.

== Administrative divisions ==
Malampa Province are subdivided into ten area councils, which are further subdivided into populated places (i.e. villages, communities, etc.).

- Central Malekula Area Council
- North Ambrym Area Council
- North East Malekula Area Council
- North West Malekula Area Council
- Paama Area Council
- South East Ambrym Area Council
- South East Malekula Area Council
- South Malekula Area Council
- South West Malekula Area Council
- West Ambrym Area Council

== Population ==
It has a population of 36,722 (2009 census) people and an area of 2,779 km^{2}. Its capital is Lakatoro on Malakula.

== Islands ==
Name	Population	Area in km^{2}
Akhamb	646	
Ambrym	7,275	678
Arseo	0	
Atchin	738	
Avock	241	
Khoti	14	
Lopevi	0	
Malakula	22,934	2,041
Maskelynes Islands	1,022	
Norsup	88	
Paama	1,627	
Rano	304	
Tomman	253	
Uri	28	
Uripiv	384	
Vao	898	
Wala	270	

== Mountains ==
- Pénot
- Maroum

== Bays ==
- Black Sand Bay
- South West Bay
