= Languages of Vanuatu =

Languages spoken in the South Pacific country Vanuatu

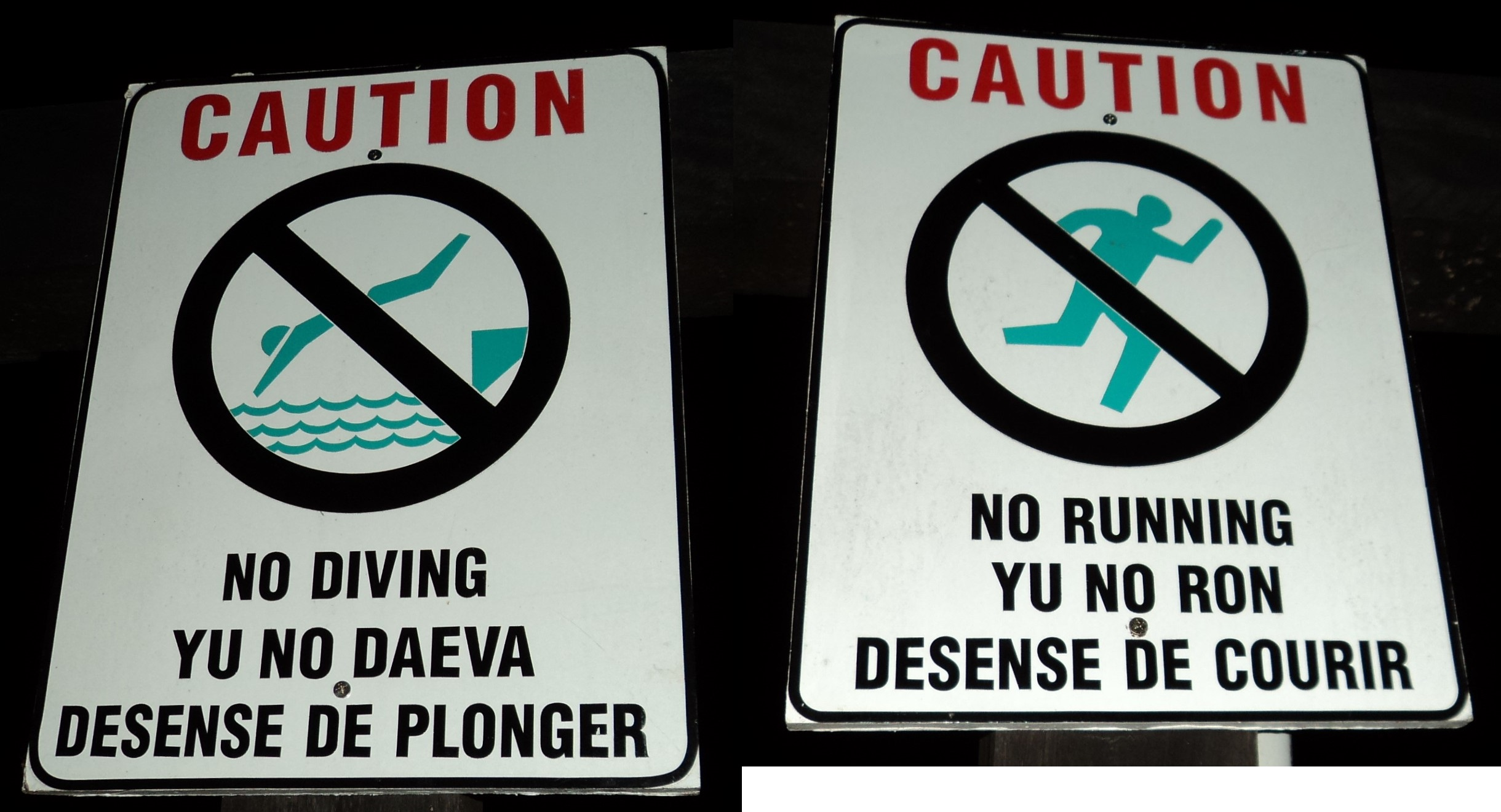
- Signage in English, Bislama, and misspelled French (Note: The French word "défense" is misspelled on both of these signs.)
- Official: English, French, Bislama
- National: Bislama
- Indigenous: 138 languages, all Oceanic
- Immigrant: Chinese, Samoan
- Keyboard layout: QWERTY, AZERTY

The Republic of Vanuatu has the world's highest linguistic density per capita. Despite being a country with a population of less than 300,000, Vanuatu is home to 138 indigenous Oceanic languages.

The country's three official languages are of foreign origin: English, French, and Bislama, an English-based creole language.

Additional languages are also spoken as a result of recent migrations (e.g. Samoan, Hakka Chinese, Mandarin Chinese).

== The linguistic situation in Vanuatu ==
=== Indigenous languages ===
There are over one hundred local languages spread over the archipelago (listed below), all of them belonging to the Austronesian family of languages.

Vanuatu is the country with the highest density of languages per capita in the world: it currently shows an average of about 1,760 speakers for each indigenous language, and went through a historical low of 565; only Papua New Guinea comes close. Some of these languages are very endangered, with only a handful of speakers, and indeed several have become extinct in recent times. Generally however, despite the low numbers for most of the indigenous languages, they are not considered especially vulnerable to extinction.

=== Bislama ===
A Bislama speaker, recorded in Vanuatu.

Bislama, a creole language derived from English, similar to Tok Pisin of Papua New Guinea and other nearby creoles, is the first language of many urban ni-Vanuatu, that is, the residents of Port Vila and Luganville; it is the most common second language elsewhere in the Vanuatu islands.

In recent years, the use of Bislama as a first language has considerably encroached on indigenous languages, whose use in the population has receded from 73.1 to 63.2 percent between 1999 and 2009.

Out of the three official languages, Bislama is the most spoken in Vanuatu, followed by English, and lastly French.

=== English and French ===
From the times when Vanuatu was a British-French condominium, there is still an unofficial separation line between regions where English or French are taught at school. According to Ethnologue, English is the first language of 6,000 people (2% of the population) and it is spoken as a second language by 120,000 people (40%). French is the first language of 1,800 people (1%) and is spoken as a second language by 87,000 people (29%).

The majority of the country's population (63.2% in 2009) speak an indigenous language as their first language, with Bislama as a second language. English and French are generally spoken as third languages, in spite of their official status.

== List of Vanuatu's indigenous languages ==
A speaker of Mwotlap, recorded in Vanuatu.

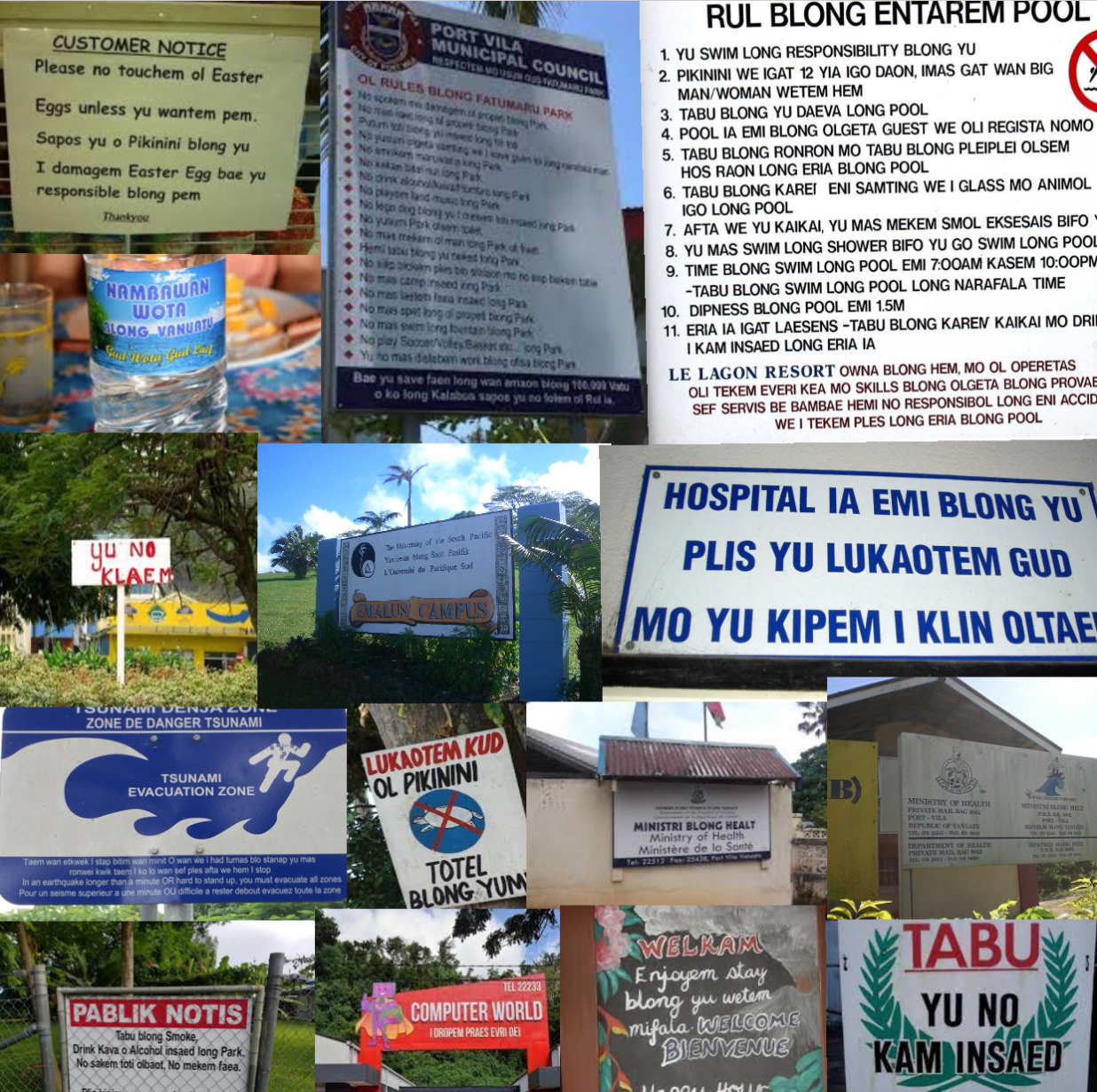
Signs in Vanuatu in Bislama, English and French

Vanuatu is home to more than a hundred indigenous languages: a recent count lists 138. Among them, three became extinct in recent decades. Many are named after the island they are spoken on, though some of the larger islands have several different languages. Espiritu Santo and Malakula are linguistically the most diverse, with about two dozen languages each.

Some language names refer to networks of dialects rather than unified languages. Uripiv, for example, is a dialect continuum spoken across several islands in Malampa Province. In such cases, the decision as to how many languages should be counted is notoriously difficult, and sometimes the object of controversy. The number of 112 listed below may differ from other counts proposed in the literature, depending partly on these difficulties.

All indigenous languages of Vanuatu are Oceanic. Three are Polynesian languages of the Futunic group: Emae, Mele-Fila and Futuna-Aniwa. The remaining languages belong to these three groups of the Southern Oceanic branch of Oceanic:

- North Vanuatu
- Central Vanuatu
- South Vanuatu

=== Ethnologue ===
Below is the Ethnologue's list of most of the indigenous languages of Vanuatu, which are still spoken or were until recently. It provides links to an OLAC list of media resources on the language.

Tip: Click on the column title to change the sort order.

Language	OLAC	Other names	Speakers	% of total population	Region	Family	Notes
Akei	tsr	Tasiriki	650	0.2404	Espiritu Santo	NCV	
Amblong	alm		300	0.1109	Espiritu Santo	NCV	
Anejom̃	aty	Aneityum	900	0.3328	Aneityum	SV	
Aore	aor		Extinct	0.0000	Espiritu Santo, Aore	NCV	
Apma	app		7,800	2.8846	Pentecost	NCV	
Araki	akr		8	0.0030	Araki	NCV	Moribund
Aulua	aul		750	0.2774	Malekula	NCV	
Avava	tmb	Katbol	700	0.2589	Malekula	NCV	
Axamb	ahb	Ahamb	750	0.2774	Malekula	NCV	
Baetora	btr		1,330	0.4919	Maewo	NCV	
Baki	bki	Burumba, Paki	350	0.1294	Epi	NCV	
Bierebo	bnk	Bonkovia-yevali	800	0.2959	Epi	NCV	
Bieria	brj	Bieri, Vovo, Wowo	70	0.0259	Epi	NCV	Endangered
Burmbar	vrt	Banan Bay, Vartavo	900	0.3328	Malekula	NCV	
Butmas-Tur	bnr	Ati	520	0.1923	Espiritu Santo	NCV	
Central Maewo	mwo		1,400	0.5177	Maewo	NCV	
Daakie	ptv	Port-Vato	1,300	0.4808	Ambrym	NCV	
Daakaka	bpa	Baiap, South Ambrym	1,200	0.4438	Ambrym	NCV	
Dixon Reef	dix		50	0.0185	Malekula	NCV	Shifting
Dorig	wwo	Wetamut	300	0.1109	Banks Islands (Gaua)	NCV	
Emae	mmw		400	0.1479	Shepherd Islands (Emae)	Polynesian	
Eton	etn		500	0.1849	Efate	NCV	
Fortsenal	frt	Kiai	450	0.1664	Espiritu Santo	NCV	
Futuna-Aniwa	fut	West Futuna	1,500	0.5547	Futuna, Aniwa	Polynesian	
Hano	lml	Raga	6,500	2.4038	Pentecost	NCV	
Hiw	hiw	Hiu	280	0.1035	Torres Islands (Hiw)	NCV	
Ifo	iff		Extinct	0.0000	Erromango	SV	
Kwamera	tnk		3,500	1.2944	Tanna	SV	
Koro	krf		250	0.0925	Banks Islands (Gaua)	NCV	
Lamenu	lmu	Lamen, Varmali	850	0.3143	Epi, Lamen	NCV	
Lakon	lkn	Lakona; Vurē	800	0.2959	Banks Islands (Gaua)	NCV	
Lamap	psw	Port Sandwich	1,200	0.4438	Malekula	NCV	
Larevat	lrv	Laravat	680	0.2515	Malekula	NCV	
Lehali	tql		200	0.0740	Banks Islands (Ureparapara)	NCV	
Lelepa	lpa	Havannah Harbour	400	0.1479	Lelepa, Efate	NCV	
Lemerig	lrz	Sasar	2	0.0007	Banks Islands (Vanua Lava)	NCV	Moribund
Lenakel	tnl		11,500	4.2529	Tanna	SV	
Letemboi	nms	Small Nambas	800	0.2959	Malekula	NCV	
Lewo	lww	Varsu	2,200	0.8136	Epi	NCV	
Lonwolwol	crc	West Ambrym	1,200	0.4438	Ambrym	NCV	
Lorediakarkar	lnn		850	0.3143	Espiritu Santo	NCV	
Lo-Toga	lht	Loh, Toga	580	0.2145	Torres Islands (Lo, Toga, Tegua)	NCV	
Löyöp	urr	Lehalurup	240	0.0888	Banks Islands (Ureparapara)	NCV	
Mae	mme	Dirak	1,000	0.3698	Malekula	NCV	
Maii	mmm		180	0.0666	Epi	NCV	
Malfaxal	mlx	Na'ahai	600	0.2219	Malekula	NCV	
Malua Bay	mll	Middle Nambas	500	0.1849	Malekula	NCV	
Maragus	mrs		15	0.0055	Malekula	NCV	
Maskelynes	klv		1,100	0.4068	Malekula, Maskelynes Islands	NCV	
Mav̈ea	mkv	Mavea, Mafea	34	0.0126	Mav̈ea	NCV	
Mele-Fila	mxe	Ifira-Mele	3,500	1.2944	Efate, Mele, Ifira	Polynesian	
Merei	lmb		400	0.1479	Espiritu Santo	NCV	
Morouas	mrp		150	0.0555	Espiritu Santo	NCV	
Mota	mtt		750	0.2774	Banks Islands (Mota)	NCV	
Mpotovoro	mvt		430	0.1590	Malekula	NCV	
Mwerlap	mrm	Merlav	1,100	0.4068	Banks Islands (Merelava)	NCV	
Mwesen	msn	Mosina	10	0.0037	Banks Islands (Vanua Lava)	NCV	
Mwotlap	mlv	Motlav	2,100	0.7766	Banks Islands (Motalava)	NCV	
Nahavaq	sns	South West Bay	700	0.2589	Malekula	NCV	
Nakanamanga	llp		9,500	3.5133	Efate, Shepherd Islands (Nguna, Tongoa)	NCV	
Namakura	nmk	Makura	3,750	1.3868	Efate, Shepherd Islands (Tongoa, Tongariki)	NCV	
Naman	lzl	Litzlitz	15	0.0055	Malekula	NCV	
Narango	nrg		160	0.0592	Espiritu Santo	NCV	
Nasarian	nvh		5	0.0018	Malekula	NCV	
Navut	nsw		520	0.1923	Espiritu Santo	NCV	
Nese			160	0.0592	Malekula	NCV	
Neverver	lgk	Lingarak	1,250	0.4623	Malekula	NCV	
Ninde	mwi	Labo	1,100	0.4068	Malekula	NCV	
Nisvai	–	Vetbon	140	0.0518	Malekula	NCV	Unesco
Nokuku	nkk		160	0.0592	Espiritu Santo	NCV	
North Tanna	tnn		5,000	1.8491	Tanna	SV	
North Ambrym	mmg		5,250	1.9416	Ambrym	NCV	
Northeast Ambae	omb	Lolovoli; Aoba	5,000	1.8491	Ambae	NCV	
Nume	tgs	Tarasag	700	0.2589	Banks Islands (Gaua)	NCV	
Olrat	olr		Extinct	0.0000	Banks Islands (Gaua)	NCV	
Paama	paa	Paamese	6,000	2.2189	Paama	NCV	
Piamatsina	ptr		150	0.0555	Espiritu Santo	NCV	
Polonombauk	plb		220	0.0814	Espiritu Santo	NCV	
Repanbitip	rpn		90	0.0333	Malekula	NCV	
Rerep	pgk	Pangkumu, Tisman	380	0.1405	Malekula	NCV	
Roria	rga	Mores	75	0.0277	Espiritu Santo	NCV	
Saa	sax	Sa	2,500	0.9245	Pentecost	NCV	
Sakao	sku	Hog Harbour, N'kep	4,000	1.4793	Espiritu Santo, Sakao	NCV	
Shark Bay	ssv		450	0.1664	Espiritu Santo, Litaro	NCV	
Sie	erg	Se, Erromanga	1,900	0.7027	Erromango	SV	
Ske	ske	Seke	300	0.1109	Pentecost	NCV	
South Efate	erk	Erakor, Nafsan	6,000	2.2189	Efate	NCV	
Southeast Ambrym	tvk		3,700	1.3683	Ambrym	NCV	
Southwest Tanna	nwi		5,000	1.8491	Tanna	SV	
Sowa	sww		Extinct	0.0000	Pentecost	NCV	
Sungwadia	mrb	Marino; North Maewo	500	0.1849	Maewo	NCV	
Tamambo	mla	Malo; Tamabo	4,000	1.4793	Malo	NCV	
Tambotalo	tls		50	0.0185	Espiritu Santo	NCV	
Tangoa	tgp		800	0.2959	Tangoa	NCV	
Tasmate	tmt		150	0.0555	Espiritu Santo	NCV	
Tiale	mnl		400	0.1479	Espiritu Santo	NCV	
Tolomako	tlm		900	0.3328	Espiritu Santo	NCV	
Tutuba	tmi		500	0.1849	Espiritu Santo, Tutuba	NCV	
Unua	onu	Onua	520	0.1923	Malekula	NCV	
Ura	uur		6	0.0022	Erromango	SV	
Uripiv-Wala-Rano-Atchin	upv	Uripiv	9,000	3.3284	Malekula	NCV	
Valpei	vlp		300	0.1109	Espiritu Santo	NCV	
Vao	vao		1,900	0.7027	Vao, Malekula	NCV	
V'ënen Taut	nmb	Big Nambas	3,350	1.2389	Malekula	NCV	
Vera'a	vra	Vatrata	500	0.1849	Banks Islands (Vanua Lava)	NCV	
Vinmavis	vnm	Neve'ei	500	0.1849	Malekula	NCV	
Volow	mlv	Valuwa	Extinct	0.0000	Banks Islands (Mota Lava)	NCV	
Vunapu	vnp		380	0.1405	Espiritu Santo	NCV	
Vurës	msn	Vureas, Mosina	2,000	0.7396	Banks Islands (Vanua Lava)	NCV	
Wailapa	wlr		100	0.0370	Espiritu Santo	NCV	
West Ambae	nnd	Duidui	8,700	3.2174	Ambae	NCV	
Whitesands	tnp		7,500	2.7736	Tanna	SV	
Wusi	wsi		300	0.1109	Espiritu Santo	NCV	

=== François et al. (2015) ===
The following list of 138 Vanuatu languages is from François et al. (2015:18–21).

No.	Language	Other names	Speakers	ISO 639-3	Region
1	Hiw	Hiu	280	hiw	Torres Islands (Hiw)
2	Lo-Toga	Loh, Toga	580	lht	Torres Islands (Lo, Toga, Tegua)
3	Lehali		200	tql	Banks Islands (Ureparapara)
4	Löyöp	Lehalurup	240	urr	Banks Islands (Ureparapara)
5	Mwotlap	Motlav	2100	mlv	Banks Islands (Motalava)
6	Volow	Valuwa	1	mlv	Banks Islands (Motalava)
7	Mota		750	mtt	Banks Islands (Mota)
8	Lemerig	Sasar	2	lrz	Banks Islands (Vanua Lava)
9	Vera'a	Vatrata	500	vra	Banks Islands (Vanua Lava)
10	Vurës	Vureas, Mosina	2000	msn	Banks Islands (Vanua Lava)
11	Mwesen	Mosina	10	msn	Banks Islands (Vanua Lava)
12	Nume	Tarasag	700	tgs	Banks Islands (Gaua)
13	Dorig	Wetamut	300	wwo	Banks Islands (Gaua)
14	Koro		250	krf	Banks Islands (Gaua)
15	Olrat		3	olr	Banks Islands (Gaua)
16	Lakon	Lakona, Vurē	800	lkn	Banks Islands (Gaua)
17	Mwerlap	Merlav	1100	mrm	Banks Islands (Merelava)
18	Sungwadia	Marino, North Maewo	500	mrb	Maewo
19	Sungwadaga	Central Maewo	1400	mwo	Maewo
20	Baetora	South Maewo, Sungaloge	1330	btr	Maewo
21	East Ambae	Lolovoli, Aoba	5000	omb	Ambae
22	West Ambae	Duidui	8700	nnd	Ambae
23	Raga	Hano	6500	lml	Pentecost
24	Apma		7800	app	Pentecost
25	Ske	Seke	300	ske	Pentecost
26	Sa	Saa	3900	sax	Pentecost
27	Tolomako	Bigbay	900	tlm	Espiritu Santo
28	Piamatsina		250	ptr	Espiritu Santo
29	Vunapu		380	vnp	Espiritu Santo
30	Valpei		300	vlp	Espiritu Santo
31	Nokuku		250	nkk	Espiritu Santo
32	Meri	Tasmate, Oa	300	tmt	Espiritu Santo
33	Wusi	Kula	350	wsi	Espiritu Santo
34	Bura		300		Espiritu Santo
35	Merei	Tiale, Lametin	400	lmb, mnl	Espiritu Santo
36	Mores	Ko	200	mrp	Espiritu Santo
37	Ande	Morouas	500		Espiritu Santo
38	Toksiki	Soisoru, Roria	200	rga	Espiritu Santo
39	Kiai	Fortsenal	450	frt	Espiritu Santo
40	Moiso		100		Espiritu Santo
41	Kene		300		Espiritu Santo
42	Daruru		100		Espiritu Santo
43	Akei	Tasiriki	4000	tsr	Espiritu Santo
44	Retlatur		100		Espiritu Santo
45	Wailapa	Ale	500	wlr	Espiritu Santo
46	Farsaf	Narango, Nambel	400	nrg	Espiritu Santo
47	Varavara	Amblong, Aje	300	alm	Espiritu Santo
48	Narmoris		220	plb	Espiritu Santo
49	Biliru	Tambotalo	3	tls	Espiritu Santo
50	Atin		120		Espiritu Santo
51	Ati	Polonombauk, Meris	85		Espiritu Santo
52	Farnanto		100		Espiritu Santo
53	Se	Fanafo	20		Espiritu Santo
54	Sinia	Navut	520	nsw	Espiritu Santo
55	Butmas-Tur	Ati, Farafi	520	bnr	Espiritu Santo
56	Ngen	Shark Bay	450	ssv	Espiritu Santo, Litaro
57	Tholp	Nethalp	0		Espiritu Santo
58	Sakao	Hog Harbour, Nkep	4000	sku	Espiritu Santo
59	Mavea	Mav̋ea, Mafea	34	mkv	Espiritu Santo, Mavea
60	Tutuba		500	tmi	Espiritu Santo, Tutuba
61	Aore		0	aor	Espiritu Santo, Aore
62	Tamambo	Malo, Tamabo	4000	mla	Espiritu Santo, Malo
63	Tangoa	Movono	370	tgp	Espiritu Santo, Tangoa
64	Araki		8	akr	Espiritu Santo, Araki
65	Axamb	Ahamb	750	ahb	Malakula
66	Lendamboi	Small Nambas, Letemboi	800	nms	Malakula
67	Nasvang		275		Malakula
68	Sörsörian		3		Malakula
69	Avok		500		Malakula, Avok
70	Uliveo	Maskelynes	1100	klv	Malakula, Maskelynes
71	Port Sandwich	Lamap	1200	psw	Malakula
72	Nisvai	Vetbon	200		Malakula
73	Burmbar	Banam Bay, Vartavo	900	vrt	Malakula
74	Mbwenelang		<10		Malakula
75	Aulua		750	aul	Malakula
76	Niolean	Repanbitip	90	rpn	Malakula
77	Rerep	Pangkumu, Tisman	380	pgk	Malakula
78	Unua	Onua	520	onu	Malakula
79	Vivti		<5		Malakula
80	Nitita		<5		Malakula
81	Avava	Katbol, Navava, Bangsa'	700	tmb	Malakula
82	Neverver	Lingarak, Nevwervwer	1250	lgk	Malakula
83	Litzlitz	Naman	15	lzl	Malakula
84	Uripiv	Uripiv-Wala-Rano-Atchin, Northeast Malakula	9000	upv	Malakula, Atchin, Uripiv
85	Rutan		?		Malakula
86	Botovro	Mpotovoro	430	mvt	Malakula
87	Vao		1900	vao	Malakula, Vao
88	Alovas		?		Malakula
89	Vovo		475		Malakula
90	Nese	Matanvat	160		Malakula
91	Najit		<5		Malakula
92	Malua Bay	Middle Nambas	500	mll	Malakula
93	Njav		10		Malakula
94	Tirax	Mae, Dirak	1000	mme	Malakula
95	V'ënen Taut	Big Nambas	3350	nmb	Malakula
96	Tape	Maragus	15	mrs	Malakula
97	Larëvat	Laravat, Larevat	680	lrv	Malakula
98	Neve'ei	Vinmavis	500	vnm	Malakula
99	Nivat		<10		Malakula
100	Nasarian		5	nvh	Malakula
101	Aveteian	Dixon Reef	50	dix	Malakula
102	Ninde	Labo	1100	mwi	Malakula
103	Nahavaq	South West Bay, Siesip	700	sns	Malakula
104	Nāti		25		Malakula
105	Naha'ai	Malvaxal, Malfaxal	600	mlx	Malakula
106	Navwien		5		Malakula
107	North Ambrym		5250	mmg	Ambrym
108	Orkon	Fanbak	30	fnb	Ambrym
109	Southeast Ambrym		3700	tvk	Ambrym
110	Daakie	Port Vato	1300	ptv	Ambrym
111	Daakaka	South Ambrym, Baiap	1200	bpa	Ambrym
112	Dalkalaen		1000		Ambrym
113	Raljago	West Ambrym, Lonwolwol	<10	crc	Ambrym
114	Paama	Paamese	6000	paa	Paama
115	Lamen	Lamenu, Varmali	850	lmu	Epi, Lamen
116	Lewo	Varsu	2200	lww	Epi
117	Bierebo	Bonkovia-Yevali	900	bnk	Epi
118	Baki	Burumba, Paki	350	bki	Epi
119	Mkir	Maii	180	mmm	Epi
120	Bieria	Bieri, Vovo, Wowo	25	brj	Epi
121	Namakura	Makura, Namakir	3750	nmk	Efate, Shepherd Islands (Tongoa, Tongariki)
122	Emae	Makatea	400	mmw	Shepherd Islands (Emae)
123	Nakanamanga		9500	llp	Efate, Shepherd Islands (Nguna, Tongoa)
124	Lelepa	Havannah Harbour	400	lpa	Efate, Lelepa
125	Eton		500	etn	Efate
126	South Efate	Erakor	6000	erk	Efate
127	Mele-Fila	Ifira-Mele	3500	mxe	Efate, Mele, Ifira
128	Sie	Se, Sie, Erromanga	1900	erg	Erromango
129	Ura		6	uur	Erromango
130	Utaha		0	iff	Erromango
131	North Tanna		5000	tnn	Tanna
132	Lenakel	Netvaar	11500	tnl	Tanna
133	Southwest Tanna	Nawal	5000	nwi	Tanna
134	Whitesands	Narak	7500	tnp	Tanna
135	Kwamera	Nafe, Nɨfe	3500	tnk	Tanna
137	Anejom̃	Aneityum	900	aty	Aneityum
138	Futuna-Aniwa	West Futuna	1500	fut	Futuna, Aniwa

== Statistics on literacy ==
Below are statistics as of the 2020 Vanuatu census.

=== In English and French ===
Percentage of people aged 15 and over in each province of Vanuatu who reported being literate in English (left) and French (right) in the 2020 census.
Legend
- 0–5%
  5–10%
  10–15%
  15–20%
  20–25%
  25–30%
  30–35%
  35–40%
  40–45%
  45–50%
  50–55%
  55–60%
  60–65%
  65–70%
  70–75%
  75–80%
  80–85%
  85–90%

Percentage of residents over 15 years old who are literate in English and/or French
Province	English		French	
Province	Number	Percentage	Number	Percentage
Luganville	9,763	87.8%	5,846	52.6%
Malampa	18,499	74.0%	9,687	38.7%
Penama	13,284	67.2%	6,674	33.8%
Port Vila	29,656	90.0%	15,480	47.0%
Sanma	17,715	70.9%	8,281	33.2%
Shefa	29,968	88.3%	15,709	46.3%
Tafea	14,059	56.4%	8,204	32.9%
Torba	4,883	73.9%	1,793	27.1%
Urban	39,416	89.5%	21,326	48.4%
Rural	98,408	72.8%	50,348	37.2%
Vanuatu	137,827	76.9%	71,674	40.0%

=== In Indigenous languages ===
Percentage of residents over 15 years old who are literate in an Indigenous language
Province	Can read		Can write	
Province	Number	Percentage	Number	Percentage
Luganville	7,757	69.8%	7,385	66.4%
Malampa	14,695	58.8%	13,723	54.9%
Penama	14,362	72.7%	13,810	69.9%
Port Vila	26,087	79.1%	25,318	76.9%
Sanma	16,894	67.7%	16,209	64.9%
Shefa	33,949	83.2%	27,504	81.0%
Tafea	12,996	52.1%	12,062	48.3%
Torba	3,724	56.3%	3,394	51.3%
Urban	33,843	76.8%	32,703	74.2%
Rural	90,921	67.2%	86,701	64.1%
Vanuatu	124,764	69.6%	119,404	66.6%
