= Tutuba =

Tutuba may refer to:

- Tutuba, an island of Vanuatu
- Tutuba language, the Oceanic language spoken on this island
