= Baetora language =

Austronesian language spoken in Vanuatu

Baetora
- South Maewo, Sungaloge
- Native to: Vanuatu
- Region: Maewo
- Native speakers: 1,300 (2001)
- Language family: Austronesian: Malayo-Polynesian; Oceanic; Southern Oceanic; North-Central Vanuatu; North Vanuatu; Baetora
- Dialects: Nasawa; Talise (not Talise); Narovorovo

Language codes
- ISO 639-3: btr
- Glottolog: baet1237
- Baetora is not endangered according to the classification system of the UNESCO Atlas of the World's Languages in Danger

Baetora (also Sungaloge or South Maewo, is an Oceanic language spoken on Maewo, Vanuatu. There is a large degree of dialectal diversity.
