= Sungwadaga language =

Austronesian language spoken in Vanuatu

Sungwadaga
- Central Maewo, Peterara
- Native to: Vanuatu
- Region: Maewo
- Native speakers: 1,400 (2001)
- Language family: Austronesian: Malayo-Polynesian; Oceanic; Southern Oceanic; North-Central Vanuatu; North Vanuatu; Sungwadaga
- Dialects: Lotora; Tanoriki; Peterara; ? Arata; ? Bangoro

Language codes
- ISO 639-3: mwo
- Glottolog: cent2058
- Sungwadaga is not endangered according to the classification system of the UNESCO Atlas of the World's Languages in Danger

Sungwadaga or Central Maewo, also known as Peterara after one of its dialects, is an Oceanic language spoken on Maewo, Vanuatu.

== Names ==
Alternate names for Sungwadaga include Central Maewo, Maevo and Tanoriki.

== Phonology ==
=== Consonants ===
| | | Labial- velar | Labial | Alveolar | Velar |
|---|---|---|---|---|---|
| Plosive | voiceless | | | t | |
| Plosive | prenasal | ᵑɡʷ | ᵐb | ⁿd | ᵑɡ |
| Nasal | | ŋʷ | m | n | ŋ |
| Fricative | | xʷ | f | s | x |
| Rhotic | | | | r | |
| Lateral | | | | l | |
| Approximant | | w | | | |

=== Vowels ===
| | Front | Central | Back |
|---|---|---|---|
| Close | i | | u |
| Mid | e | | o |
| Open | | a | |
