= Maewo-Naone Airport =

- IATA: MWF; ICAO: NVSN

Summary
- Airport type: Public
- Location: Maewo, Vanuatu
- Coordinates: 14°59′50″S 168°04′52″E

Map
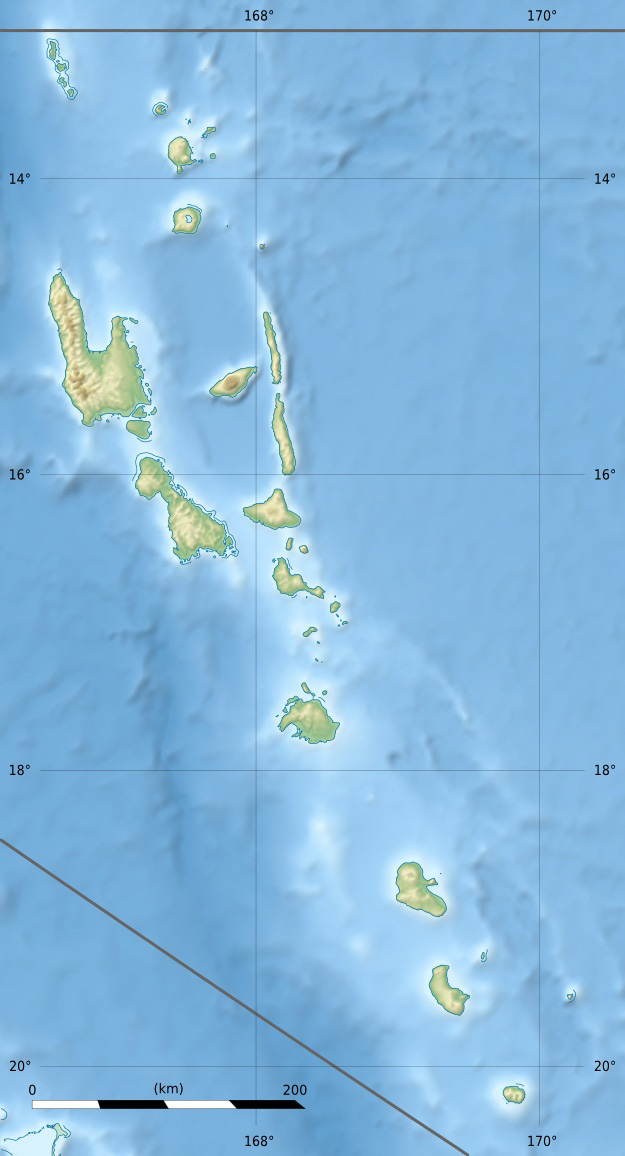
- Location of airport in Vanuatu

Maewo-Naone Airport (IATA: MWF, ICAO: NVSN) is an airport on Maewo in Vanuatu.

== Airlines and destinations ==
Air Vanuatu connects Maewo Airport to Santo International Airport (Luganville).
