= Sungwadia language =

Austronesian language spoken in Vanuatu

Sungwadia
- Marino
- North Maewo
- Native to: Vanuatu
- Region: Maewo
- Native speakers: 500 (2008)
- Language family: Austronesian: Malayo-Polynesian; Oceanic; Southern Oceanic; North-Central Vanuatu; North Vanuatu; Sungwadia

Language codes
- ISO 639-3: mrb
- Glottolog: mari1426
- ELP: Marino
- Sungwadia is not endangered according to the classification system of the UNESCO Atlas of the World's Languages in Danger

Sungwadia, also known as Marino and North Maewo, is an Oceanic language spoken on Maewo, Vanuatu.

== Phonology ==
=== Consonants ===
		Labial- velar	Labial	Alveolar	Velar
Plosive	voiceless	kʷ		t	k
Plosive	prenasal		ᵐb	ⁿd	
Nasal		ŋʷ	m	n	ŋ
Fricative			f	s	x
Rhotic				r	
Lateral				l	
Approximant		w			

- /k/ can also have prenasal allophones [ᵑɡ] or [ᵑk].
- /ŋʷ/ can also have an allophone of a labial [mʷ] in word-initial position.

=== Vowels ===
	Front	Central	Back
Close	i		u
Mid	e		o
Open		a	

- /e, o/ can also have allophones of more open sounds [ɛ, ɔ].
- /i/ can also be heard as a semivowel [j] in word-final position.
