= West Ambae language =

Austronesian language spoken in Vanuatu

West Ambae
- Native to: Vanuatu
- Region: Ambae
- Native speakers: 8,700 (2001)
- Language family: Austronesian: Malayo-Polynesian; Oceanic; Southern Oceanic; North-Central Vanuatu; North Vanuatu; West Ambae
- Dialects: Nduindui (Duidui); Walaha

Language codes
- ISO 639-3: nnd
- Glottolog: west2513
- West Ambae is not endangered according to the classification system of the UNESCO Atlas of the World's Languages in Danger

Regianna speaking West Ambae.

West Ambae (also known as Duidui, the principal dialect, and Opa, the Mota name for the island) is an Oceanic language spoken on Ambae, Vanuatu. Dialects of West Ambae include Walaha and Nduindui (Duidui). The New Testament was published in West Ambae in 1984.

== Phonology ==
Consonants
		Bilabial	Alveolar	Velar	Labiovelar	Glottal
Plosive	voiceless		t	k	kʷ	
Plosive	voiced	ᵐb	ⁿd	^{(ŋ)}ɡ	^{(ŋ)}ɡʷ	
Fricative		β	s			h
Nasal		m	n	ŋ	ŋʷ	
Rhotic			r			
Lateral			l			

Voiced stops /ɡ, ɡʷ/ occur as prenasalized /ᵑɡ, ᵑɡʷ/, in the Walaha dialect.

Vowels
	Front	Central	Back
Close	i		u
Mid	e		o
Open		a	
