= East Ambae language =

Austronesian language spoken in Vanuatu

East Ambae
- Native to: Vanuatu
- Region: Ambae
- Native speakers: (5,000 cited 2001)
- Language family: Austronesian: Malayo-Polynesian; Oceanic; Southern Oceanic; North-Central Vanuatu; North Vanuatu; East Ambae
- Dialects: Lolokaro; Lombaha; Longana

Language codes
- ISO 639-3: omb
- Glottolog: east2443
- East Ambae is not endangered according to the classification system of the UNESCO Atlas of the World's Languages in Danger

Daisy speaking East Ambae.

East Ambae (also known as Ambae, Northeast Ambae, Northeast Ambae, Omba, Oba, Aoba, Walurigi, Lolovoli, and Northeast Aoba) is an Oceanic language spoken in the north, east, and south of Ambae, Vanuatu. The data in this article will concern itself with the Lolovoli dialect.

== Phonology ==
North-East Ambae distinguishes 5 vowels and 16 consonants, shown in the tables below.

Consonants
| | | Labial- velar | Bilabial | Alveolar | Velar | Glottal |
|---|---|---|---|---|---|---|
| Nasal | | mʷ | m | n | ŋ | |
| Stop | voiceless | | | t | k | |
| Stop | prenasalized | ᵑɡʷ | ᵐb | ⁿd | ᵑɡ | |
| Fricative | | | β | s | | h |
| Tap/Trill | | | | r | | |
| Approximant | | w | | l | | |

Vowels
| | Front | Central | Back |
|---|---|---|---|
| High | i | | u |
| Mid | e | | o |
| Low | | a | |

== Morphosyntax ==
=== Pronominals ===
In Ambae there are four different pronominal forms, one set of free forms, independent pronouns and three sets of bound forms, subject proclitics, object enclitics and possessive suffixes. All sets of pronominals distinguish between singular, dual and plural and between inclusive and exclusive in the first person. Independent pronouns are preceded by the personal article when the head of a noun phrase.

==== Independent pronouns ====
| | | Singular | Dual | Plural |
|---|---|---|---|---|
| 1st person | exclusive | neu | gamaru | gamai |
| 1st person | inclusive | neu | gideru | gide |
| 2nd person | | niko | gimiru | gimiu |
| 3rd person | | ngie | garue | ngire |

==== Subject proclitics ====
The subject proclitic is the first part of a verb phrase and can attach to an aspect, mood, negative particle or verb head. Dual forms cliticise to the marker ru. In Lolovoli, no= is applied when cliticised in 1st person exclusive singular.

| | | Singular | Dual | Plural |
|---|---|---|---|---|
| 1st person | exclusive | na=, no= | ga=ru | ga= |
| 1st person | inclusive | na=, no= | da=ru | da= |
| 2nd person | | go= | ne=ru | ne= |
| 3rd person | | Ø, na=, vi= | ra=ru | ra= |

Go=ni inu rongo na malogu
2SG.S=IRR drink feel ACC kava
"You will taste the Kava"

Da=hivo da=si~siu
1NSG.IN.S=go.down 1NSG.IN.S=REDUP~fish
"Let's go down and fish."

==== Object enclitics ====
Object enclitics occur when attached to the predicate head or last adverb in a verb phrase. These only occur in singular forms and all 3rd person forms.

| | | Singular | Dual | Plural |
|---|---|---|---|---|
| 1st person | exclusive | =eu | gamaru | gamai |
| 1st person | inclusive | =eu | gideru | gide |
| 2nd person | | =go | gimiru | gimiu |
| 3rd person | | =a =e | =ra, =re | =ra, =re |

Ra=u hui i gide
3NSG.S=TEL ask PERS 1NSG.IN
"They asked us."

Go=mese wehe i netu-ku
2SG.S=DEHOR hit PERS child-1SG.POS
"Don't hit my children."

==== Possessive suffixes ====
Possessive suffixes are attached to the head noun in a direct possessive construction, or a relational classifier in an indirect possessive construction.

| | | Singular | Dual | Plural |
|---|---|---|---|---|
| 1st person | exclusive | -ku | -ma=ru | -mai |
| 1st person | inclusive | -ku | -da=ru | -da, -de |
| 2nd person | | -mu | -me=ru | -miu |
| 3rd person | | -na, -ne | =ra, =re | =ra, =re |

Nago-mu u memea
face-2SG.POS TEL red
"Your face is red."

no-ku bue
CL.GEN-1SG.POS knife
"my knife"

=== Demonstratives ===
In East Ambae, demonstratives are a part of the subclass of nominals. They can function pronominally as an independent pronoun at the head of a noun phrase, or they can modify the head noun in a noun phrase.

There are two forms which distinguish a proximal location from a distal location. The form ngaha 'this' refers to a proximal location, while ngihie 'that' refers to a distal location. While generally considered a conservative Oceanic language, in this way, East Ambae differs from many Oceanic languages, and the reconstructed Proto-Oceanic in that it only has two forms to represent locations. Most Oceanic languages, for example, Futuna-Aniwa, the Oceanic language also spoken on Vanuatu, have three forms, representing a near distance, a medium distance, and a far distance. East Ambae also differs from Proto-Oceanic by not only using demonstratives at the end of the noun phrase.

Ngihie also has a plural form, ngire, which is homophonous with the third person plural independent pronoun.

Tangaloi ngihie u haro.
person that TEL not.know
That person doesn't know.

Tangaloi ngire ra=u haro.
person 3NSG 3NSG.S=TEL not.know
Those people don't know.

The form ngaha can also have a temporal meaning of 'now'. This is shown in the example below.

Ngaha no=vo na=ni tomu.
now 1SG.S=say 1SG.S=IRR tell.story
Now I want to tell a traditional story.

The form ngihie can also function as an emphatic demonstrative, acting to modify an entire proposition.

Whether being used as the head of the noun phrase, or to modify the noun, the demonstratives take on the same form(s), ngaha and ngihie. This is typologically similar to other Oceanic languages, who often do not have different forms, either in the stem or in the inflection based on whether the demonstrative is acting as a noun or a modifier.

==== Demonstratives as the head noun ====
Demonstratives, either in the form of the basic demonstratives ngaha 'this' (3) or ngihie 'that', or by a demonstrative derived from one of the members of the class of directionals prefixed with the demonstrative formative gi- or ngi- (5), can act as the head noun in a noun phrase, as shown in the examples given below.

Ngaha mo maraga.
this REAL get.up
This one got up.

Ngi-ngaha gineu garea.
DEM-this thing good
This is a good thing.

Go=wali gi-hivo.
2SG.S=take DEM-down
Take that one down there.

==== Demonstratives as a modifier ====
Demonstratives, either in the form of the basic demonstratives ngaha 'this' (6) or ngihie 'that' (7), or by a demonstrative derived from one of the members of the class of directionals prefixed with the demonstrative formative gi- or ngi- (8), can act to modify the head noun of a noun phrase.

ngire ngaha, ngire hiro-hirohi.
3NSG this 3NSG REDUP-old
Those ones, they are very old.

Maresu ngihie rno ngara mwere.
child that REAL cry INT
That child was crying so much.

Go=tai na gai ngi-vano.
2SG.S=chop ACC tree DEM-across.there
Chop that tree over there.

When being used to modify the head noun, the order of noun and demonstratives in East Ambae is noun-demonstrative, which also occurs in all other languages in Vanuatu. This feature is common in almost all Oceanic languages.

Similarly to the reconstructed Proto-Oceanic, common nouns and independent pronouns can be modified by a demonstrative, while proper nouns and temporals cannot.

==== Demonstrative ge ====
Additionally, the form ge can be used to indicate the location of an object. This form is generally used when someone has asked for the location of an object, and is accompanied by either pointing to the object in question, indication with the eyes, or tilting the head.

==== Presentative ia ====
The presentative ia is used when presenting an object to the addressee. Ia is a borrowing from Bislama, an official language of Vanuatu, from the English 'here'. *Ia is the reconstructed form for 'here' in Proto-Malayo-Polynesian. Ia can still be found in many Malayo-Polynesian languages, such as Lamaholot, Tongan, Samoan, Maori and Hawaiian. An example of this presentative ia is given below.

la, no-mu bue.
here CL.GEN-2SG.POS knife
Here, your knife.

==== Demonstratives in spatial deixis ====
Apart from the two forms ngaha and ngihie, all members of the subclass of absolute location nouns, as in directionals (vano 'go along, over there', hage 'go up, up there', and hivo 'go down, down there') and the small set of absolute location nouns, aulu 'up high, on top' vine 'down low' atagu 'behind, at the back' amue 'in front, at the front' aute 'up in the bush' alau 'down by the sea' varea 'outside' and vagahao 'far away', can form demonstratives to be used for spatial reference. When prefixed with the demonstrative formative prefix (DEM), gi-/ngi-, absolute location nouns, but not place names, can form demonstratives. There is no difference between these two forms, gi- and ngi-, and the choice between the two is arbitrary. Demonstratives formed from directional and absolute location nouns can have either a referential or modifying function.

Additionally, the suffixes -mai and -atu can be added to directionals. The suffix -mai is used to denote the object being closer to the speaker, while the suffix -atu is used to denote the object being closer to the addressee. Only the suffix -mai can be added to directionals that have formed demonstratives.

In example 10, where the prefix ngi- has been added to form a demonstrative, and the suffix -mai has been added, the demonstrative indicates that the object is closer to the speaker, while in example 11, where the demonstrative is unmarked and thus has no suffix, the meaning is that the object is farther away.

Na=ni bubu-sl ngi-vanai.
1SG.S=IRR shoot-APPL DEM-across:to.sp.
I'll shoot that one closer towards me.

Go=lehi na boe ngi-hivo
2SG.S=see ACC pig DEM-down
Look at that pig down there

The suffix -atu cannot be added to demonstratives, thus example 12 is not grammatical.

Go=ni well na gineu ngi-vanatu.
2SG.S=IRR take ACC thing DEM-across:DIR
If you come, bring that thing there near you.

==== Reduplication of demonstratives ====
Reduplication is a common process in East Ambae, and demonstratives are able to be reduplicated. When directionals that have formed demonstratives are reduplicated, the purpose is to either indicate a greater distance away (as in the case of forms without the -mai suffix), shown in example 13, or a considerably closer distance to the speaker (in the case of forms with the -mai suffix), shown in example 14.

Hate, ngi-hage-hage.
no DEM-REDUP-up
No, that one further up there.

Go=bitu ngi-him-himei.
2SG.S=pick.fruit DEM-REDUP-down:to.sp
Pick that one down here closer to me.

=== Negation ===
In North-East Ambae negative construction formation differs depending on firstly, whether the unit is verbal or nonverbal, and then based on what clause structure is being employed. Instances of verbal negation are obligatorily a double negative construction, using preverbal and postverbal particles. Nonverbal structures are formed with a different particle, the placement of which varies depending on the other components in the structure.

==== Verbal negation ====
Constructions of verbal negation in East Ambae are formed through a bipartite process, as there must be two specific negative particles present. The preverbal particle is 'hi', and the postverbal particle is 'tea'. This is demonstrated in the example below. In these clauses, the subject marker is attached to the preverbal particle as a clitic. The subject proclitic attaches to the preverbal negative particles 'hi' (1) or to the irrealis particle 'ni' (2). Irrealis mood is how a speaker marks something as not known to have happened to them, as they are forming the utterance.

The word order of a negative verbal phrase is Verb Phrase → Subject = ni (hi) HEAD tea.

Na=hi. gato tea
1SG.S=NEG speak NEG
I didn't speak.

Bataha da=ni hi mwaso tea.
I.think 1NSG.IN.S=IRR NEG live NEG
I think we won't live.

Neither the realis mood or telic aspect particles can be used within a negative verbal clause.

Verbal negative clauses in the past tense are formed by using an unmarked subject marker. Clauses with an unmarked subject marker express present or past reference to time, or instead, are indicative of the habitual aspect. Example 3 shows how the pronoun 'ga' combined with the negative preverbal particle 'hi' forms the past tense negative displayed in the sentence.

Ga=hi vei rarai na no-mai avi tea.
1NSG.EX.S=NEG make ready ACC CL.GEN-1NSG.EX.POS firewood NEG
We hadn't prepared our firewood.

==== Nonverbal negation ====
In nonverbal clauses, negative mood is expressed by the negative particle 'hate'. 'Hate' can doubly function as a negative predicate that can only take a complement clause as its argument. There is no grammatical means to mark TAM (Tense, Aspect, Mood) in nonverbal clauses, therefore, tense may only be understood from the semantic context of the clause. Below is an example of a nonverbal negative clause.

Hate vo no-mu, ngie no-ku.
NEG say CL.GEN-2SG.POS 3SG CL.GEN-1SG.POS
It's not yours, it's mine.

==== Negative clause structure ====
===== Negative existential clauses =====
To form a negative existential clause, the negative particle 'hate' is placed after the Noun Phrase. In order to investigate negative clause structure, it is important to contrast the formation process of affirmative clause structure. Minimally, a positive existential clause, contains a single constituent of the Noun Phrase, and this is a predicate. When this single Noun Phrase form is formed, the predication that follows is that referent in that Noun Phrase exists. In the corresponding negative existential clauses, what is predicated is that that referent of the subject Noun Phrase does not exist. It is worth noting that there are no existential verbs in East Ambae, and that all existential clauses are subsequently nonverbal.

Formation of the negative existential clause involves the Noun Phrase becoming the subject and the negative particle becoming the predicate. This is shown in the example below.

Tuei bana [bongi maraga]NP {[hate,] PRED} ngie [bongi {gai-lime,] NP} [bongi sangavulu']NP
before because day {get u}p NEG but day NUM-five ten day
Because before there was no Ascension Day, but there was a (special feast on the) fifth day, and there was a (special feast on the) tenth day.

In positive existential clauses, modification of the head noun or a fronted topic must be present to construct these clauses. In contrast, for negative existential clauses, there is no clause initial topic slot and the subject Noun Phrase can be solely constituted by the head noun. This construction is demonstrated in the below example.

[Lulumu-gi]NP [hate.]PRED
taste.good-AL NEG
There was no good taste

===== Negative possessive clauses =====
Formation of a negative possessive clause necessitates that the negative particle 'hate' is after the relevant noun phrase. This form is very similar to that of the negative existential clause. Modification of the head noun has no bearing on the positioning of the topic clause, which remains in the initial position.

(Ngire) luqa {-ra hate.}
3NSG clothes-3NSG.POS NEG
They have no clothes./They don't have any clothes.

===== Negative equational clauses =====
Formation of all negative equational clauses necessitates that the negative particle be placed between the subject and predicate noun phrases. This is demonstrated here:

Ngie hate a tangaloi-ni ga-garu garea.
3SG NEG NOM person-CONST REDUP-swim good
S/he is not a good swimmer.

Maresu ngihie hate no-ku buluana.
child that NEG CL.GEN-1SG.POS friend
That child isn't my friend.

In these examples, the negative particle 'hate' occurs before the subject noun phrases 'he/she is' and 'that child' respectively. There are two subtypes of equational clauses: classificatory and identificational. Classificatory clauses depict the class membership of an entity, example 7 is a negative classificatory equational clause as it posits the subject 's/he' in the class of bad swimmers. Identificational clauses are similar to classificatory ones but they also assert the identity of the object. Example 8 is an identificational negative equational clause, as it asserts the object's (my friend) identity (that child).

Negative equational clauses can have a subject noun phrase that is ellipsed within the clause. For example.

Hate takure viro-viro, ngie takure vatu-vetu.
NEG sago.palm sew-REDUP but sago.palm weave-REDUP
It wasn't (a house) sewn with sago palm, but (a house) woven with sago palm. (Lit. It was not sewn sago palm, but woven sago palm.)

In the example, the subject noun phrase 'a house' is omitted in the clause.

If a speaker needs to indicate that an entity is pointedly not a member of a certain class, then the negative particle 'hate' can be used as a predicate and takes a complement clause headed by 'vo' (say). The English literal translation of 'vo' is "it is not that.." This alternate negative structure can also be used in some verbal clauses to express the same emphasis again. Below is an example of this alternative formation.

Hate vo gineu lague, gineu biti.
NEG say thing big thing small
It's not that it's a big thing, it's just a small thing.

===== Negative prepositional clauses =====
In the negative prepositional clause formation, the negative marker is placed before the prepositional phrase predicate and occurs after the subject noun phrase. For example:

Ngie hate tau Australia
3SG NEG from Australia
S/he is not from Australia.

Negative prepositional clauses are capable of a degree of ambiguity. This is due to negative prepositional clauses commonly having the same structure as existential clauses with prepositional phrase adjuncts. In the below example, it can be seen that the unmodified noun (tangaloi) can be placed as the subject noun phrase in an existential clause.

Tangaloi hate lolo vale.
person NEG in house
a) The person is not in the house.
b) There is no-one in the house.

===== Negative Complement-taking Predicate (CTP) 'hate' =====
A construction employed to signal that the event predicated in the complement clause does/did/will not happen is formed with the negative particle 'hate' preceding the particle 'vo'. With 'vo' "introducing" the 'hate' particle.

This form alters the semantic layer of the negative clause form, conveying an additional pragmatic layer. It has an implication that the speaker would have expected the predication of the complement clause to be truthful, when it is not. The pragmatic layer in this construction is not found in other simple negative forms. 'Hate' then functions as a predicate that can take a complement of verbal or nonverbal clause, take a complement clause as its argument or act as the predicate to express that something does not exist through the noun phrase in a nonverbal existential clause. 'Hate' cannot be employed in a verb phrase that has been imbued with subject or aspect/mood, despite functioning as a predicate.

Hate [vo na=ni bete=a lawe=go.]
NEG say 1SG.S=IRR give=3SG.O DAT=2SG.O
I'm not going to give it to you. (Lit. It's not that I'm going to give you. )

...hate [vo neu {tamte-gi,]} neu tangaloi vurugegi taligu.
NEG say 1SG spirit-AL 1SG person proper again
I'm not a spirit, I'm a real person again. (Lit. It's not that I'm a spirit ... )

Example 13 is a verbal clause representing a predicate which will not happen, for instance: the speaker is not going to give the subject 'it' to the object/addressee 'you'. Example 14 is a nonverbal clause, also representing a predicate that does/did/will not happen.

Across the world's languages it is generally rare for there to be a negative predicate that can take a complement clause as its argument, but this is not uncommon amongst the Oceanic language family.

== Possession ==
East Ambae has four different possessive constructions, these are the distinctions between direct and indirect possession, and simplex and complex possession (Hyslop, 2001, p. 165).

If the possessor is marked on the possessed noun, this is a direct possessive construction, whereas if the possessor is marked on a relational classifier rather than the possessee, this is an indirect possessive construction. Additionally, a simplex construction, where the possessor is pronominal, a possessive suffix occurs on the possessee or the relevant classifier, while a complex construction is one in which the possessor is represented by a nominal (Hyslop, 2001, p. 166).

The table below illustrates the four different possessive constructions.

| | Direct | Indirect |
| Simplex | possessee-poss.suffix netu-ku child-1SG.POS my child | classifier-poss.suffix possessee me-mu malogu CL:DRINK-2SG.POS kava your kava |
| Complex | possessee-i possessor netu-i Margaret child-CONST Margaret; Margaret's child | possessee classifier-i possessor malogu me-i retahigi kava CL:DRINK-CONST chief the chief's kava |

According to Hyslop (2001, p. 167), while it is a morphosyntactic difference between direct and indirect possessive constructions, it is a semantically motivated distinction. In a direct possessive construction, nouns that function as the possessee can be said to be inalienably possessed, which refers to a permanent and inherent connection between the possessor and possessee that is indissoluble. Indirect possessive construction refers to alienable possession, a relationship between two referents of a less permanent and inherent type than inalienable possession, of an item that is to be 'possessed' in the conventional sense (Hyslop, 2001, p. 176).

=== Inalienable possession ===
There are two distinct categories in East Ambae that nominals taking part in inalienable possession can belong to, these being those reflecting an intimate relationship to the possessor, and part-whole and positional relation expressions (Hyslop, 2001, p. 168). Those that reflect an intimate relationship to the possessor, the 'self' can be divided into four sub-categories: kin relations, body parts and associated body products, natural behaviour and personal attributes, and intimate personal property (Hyslop, 2001, p. 169). These sub categories are explored below.

==== Kin ====
A direct possessive construction is used in all expressions of relationships between kin (Hyslop, 2001, p. 169).

hava-da dolegi
family-1NSG.IN.POS all
all of our family

tama-i netu-i Roselyn
father-CONST child-CONST Roselyn
Roselyn's husband

tue-i re maresu
same.sex.sib-CONST PL child
"the (female) children's sister(s)" or
"the (male) children's brother(s)" or
"the children's brother(s) and sister(s)"

==== Body parts and products ====
Any body part of a person or animal is referred to using the direct possessive construction (Hyslop, 2001, p. 170).

vulu-ku
hair-1SG.POS
'my hair'

vulu-i Kenneth
hair-CONST Kenneth
'Kenneth's hair'

vulu-i toa
feather-CONST chicken
'(all/the) chicken's feathers'

In addition, any bodily features or fluids/secretions (such as tattoos and a person or animal's odour) that could be considered part of, or an extension of the body are inalienably possessed (Hyslop, 2001, p. 170).

Go=ni leo huri na bona-i bigi mate
2SG.S=IRR see PURP ACC smell-CONST meat dead
You must look out for the smell of rotting meat

Tatai-ne ra=u garea
tattoo-3SG.POS 3NSG.S=TEL good
Her tattoos are nice

Gutu-mu lu-mu?
louse-2SG.POS on-2SG.POS
Do you have lice?

==== Behaviour and personal attributes ====
Natural behaviours, physical attributes, emotions, and mental processes (such as sleep, age, anger, and thought) enter into a direct possessive construction as personal attributes such as these are seen as an inalienable aspect of the concept of the self (Hyslop, 2001, p. 171).

Maturu-ku mo vanai
sleep-1SG.POS REAL come
I am sleepy (lit. My sleep is coming)

Higao-mu gai-vihe?
year-2SG.POS NUM-how.many
How old are you? (lit. Your years are how many?)

Mero-na u lague
anger-3SG.POS TEL big
She is very angry (lit. Her anger is big)

Domi-mu ra=u hesi
thought-2SG.POS 3NSG.S=TEL bad
You have wicked thoughts! (lit. Your thoughts are bad!)

==== Intimate personal property ====
This class of objects can be possessed or 'owned' in the traditional sense, however, in the East Ambae culture, these objects are so closely associated with a person's existence that they are considered inalienable objects, and when referred to, it is using the direct possessive construction. These objects that are considered 'intimate' include things such as a person's pillow, as well as a person's clothes, which are seen as an extension of the body. This can also be said for an animal's cave or bird's nest (Hyslop, 2001, p. 172 & 173).

lumwe-ku
pillow-1SG.POS
my pillow

Go=ni gevu-gi na bari-mu
2SG.S=IRR clothes-APPL ACC skirt-2SG.POS
You will dress in your skirt

mwagoni-re
nest-3NSG.POS
their nest

==== Part-whole relations ====
Part-whole relationships are expressed in a direct possessive construction as it is used to describe parts of objects and plants that are divisible into recognised parts in the same way as body part relations are expressed. The part is the 'possessed' head noun and the whole is the 'possessor' (Hyslop, 2001, p. 174).

rau-i gai
leaf-CONST tree
leaf (leaves) of a tree

qetu-qetu-i vale-na
wall-REDUP-CONST house-3SG.POS
the walls of his house

This relationship is also used to refer to pieces of a whole. This is done by using the anticausativeised form of a verb, describing the way the object was divided, such as vise 'split', or kore 'break' (as seen in the examples below), and by taking the construct suffix, the form is marked as being a nominal (Hyslop, 2001, p. 175).

ma-vise-i qeta
ANTIC-split-CONST taro
a piece of taro

ma-kore-i avi
ANTIC-break-CONST firewood
a piece of firewood

==== Positional relations ====
Positional relations are a small subclass of bound relational location nouns and function as the possessee noun in a direct possessive construct, used to define the position of one object in relation to another, such as ulu- 'above' and mawiri- 'left, as shown below (Hyslop, 2001, p. 175).

Dodo maeto lo ulu-de
cloud black LOC above-1NSG.IN.POS
There were black clouds above us

Danuta mo toga lo mawiri-ku
Danuta REAL sit LOC left-1SG.POS
Danuta was sitting on my left

=== Alienable possession ===
Four different relational classifiers are used to express indirect possession, the use of a particular relational classifier is dependent on the possessive relationship between the possessed object and the possessor, rather than any characteristic of the possessee (Hyslop, 2001, p. 176).

The four relational classifiers are:

- ga- 'food possession'
- me- 'drink possession'
- bula- 'natural or valued object possession'
- no- 'general possession'

==== Relational classifier ga- ====
This classifier indicates that the referent of the possessee noun is a food item. This can be used for any edible item including food that has already been eaten, food that has been prepared and ready to eat, unprepared or uncooked food, and so on. Usually, the ga- relational classifier is used only to refer to food that is ready to be eaten, so an animal yet to be slaughtered or plant yet to be harvested would be referred to using the bula- classifier (Hyslop, 2001, p. 177).

Kenneth u geni na ga-na loli beno
Kenneth TEL eat ACC CL.FOOD-3SG.POS lolly already
Kenneth has already eaten her lollies

Ga-da hinaga u manoga
CL.FOOD-1NSG.IN.POS food TEL cooked
Our food is cooked

Only one relation expressed by ga- does not relate to food possession, and that is illness, despite perhaps expecting it to be categorised inalienably as a body part or product one can never describe one's illness using a direct possessive construct (Hyslop, 2001, p. 177).

ga-ra sege-ana
CL.FOOD-3NSG.POS sick-NMLZ
their illness(es)

==== Relational classifier me- ====
This classifier indicates that the referent of the possessee noun is something for the possessor to drink, this can be the possession drinkable items such as ti 'tea' or wai 'water', as well as some plants classified as drinkable rather than edible, such as tovu 'sugarcane' and lamani 'lemon' and medicine, whether it is in liquid or tablet form as even then you swallow it with water (Hyslop, 2001, p. 178).

me-ku tovu
CL.DRINK-1SG.POS sugarcane
my sugarcane

Go=bitu na lamani me-i Lulu
2SG.S=pick ACC lemon CL.DRINK-CONST Lulu
Pick some lemons for Lulu to drink

Go=dono na me-mu panadol
2SG.S=swallow ACC CL.DRINK-2SG.POS panadol
Swallow your panadol

==== Relational classifier bula- ====
The bula- classifier mainly refers to the relationship between 'natural entities' and their possessor, such as the ownership of crops and animals (Hyslop, 2001, p. 178).

Bula-na boe mo gani na bula-da toa tamwere
CL.NAT-3SG.POS pig REAL eat ACC CL.NAT-1NSG.IN.POS chicken always
His pig is always eating our chickens

Nu rivu na bule-ku qeta
1SG.S:TEL plant ACC CL.NAT-1SG.POS taro
I planted my taro

Ngie u voli na bule-ku toli-gi
3SG TEL buy ACC CL.NAT-1SG.POS seed-AL
She bought me some seeds (to plant)

This category has been broadened to include some items introduced by Europeans that could be said to have some lifelike characteristics (Hyslop, 2001, p. 179). An example of these items are listed below.

- redio 'radio'
- taragi 'car, automobile'
- hanwaj 'watch'
- tep 'tape recorder'

Another category includes items of adornment as they are not inalienably possessed as clothing is (Hyslop, 2001, p. 179). Examples include:

- iaring 'earrings'
- lala 'bracelet'

==== Relational classifier no- ====
The no- classifier is considered a general classifier, or the default category, for a range of possessive relationships that are not related to any of the other categories of possessive relationships previously mentioned (Hyslop, 2001, p. 180) Possessive relationships included in this category are: traditional ownership of objects, activities such as work, the possessor's relationship with people who are not kin, and natural behaviours and mental processes that are not part of a direct possessive construction (Hyslop, 2001, p. 180).

Ngire no-ra bubusi hate
3NSG CL.GEN-3NSG.POS gun NEG
They didn't have guns

No-da hala mo dadari
CL.GEN-1NSG.IN.POS visitor REAL arrive
Our visitor has arrived

Gai-siwo ra=u vei no-na tabana-gi
NUM-nine 3NSG.S=TEL do CL.GEN-3SG.POS work-NMLZ
Nine (of them) did his work

...mo bulu-tegi na no-ra domi-ana...
REAL join-APPL ACC CL.GEN-3NSG.POS think-NMLZ
...they joined together their thoughts...

== Abbreviations ==
| - | Separates morphemes |
| . | Separates clitics |
| = | Separates words in multi-word gloss or meanings in a semantically complex morpheme |
| 1 | 1st person |
| 2 | 2nd person |
| 3 | 3rd person |
| ACC | Accusative case article |
| AL | Alienable suffix |
| APPL | Applicative suffix |
| CL.GEN | General possession classifier |
| CONST | Construct suffix |
| DAT | Dative preposition |
| DEHOR | Dehortative mood particle |
| DEM | Demonstrative formative prefix |
| DIR | Deictic specifying direction towards addressee/past-future deictic centre |
| EX | Exclusive |
| IN | Inclusive |
| INST | Instrumental preposition |
| INT | Intensifier |
| IRR | Irrealis mood particle |
| NEG | Negative particle |
| NOM | Nominative case article |
| NP | Noun Phrase |
| NSG | Non-singular |
| NUM | Numeral marker |
| O | Object enclitic |
| PL | Plural human article |
| POS | Possessive suffix |
| PP | Prepositional phrase |
| REAL | Realis mood particle |
| REDUP | Reduplication |
| S | Subject proclitic |
| SG | Singular |
| TEL | Telic aspect particle |
| VP | Verb Phrase |
