= Sakao language =

Austronesian language spoken in Vanuatu

Sakao
- Wanohe, Nkep, Nekep
- Native to: Vanuatu
- Region: Big Bay, Espiritu Santo Island
- Native speakers: (4,000 cited 2001)
- Language family: Austronesian: Malayo-Polynesian; Oceanic; Southern Oceanic; North-Central Vanuatu; North Vanuatu; Espiritu Santo; Sakao
- Dialects: Nkep

Language codes
- ISO 639-3: sku
- Glottolog: saka1289
- Sakao is not endangered according to the classification system of the UNESCO Atlas of the World's Languages in Danger

Sakao (also Nkep or Nekep) is an Oceanic language spoken on the northeast horn of Espiritu Santo, Vanuatu.

== Name ==
Sakao is the name of the language as used by foreigners and linguists. It is named after Sakao Island, an islet off the northeastern shore of Espiritu Santo, almost opposite Port-Olry. (Incidentally, this is not the native name of that island, which is called Laðhi by Sakao speakers. The name sakau < Proto-Oceanic *sakaRu means ‘coral reef’ in various languages of Vanuatu, but it is unknown exactly which one gave its name to the island.)

The speakers of Sakao refer to their own language using various names, depending on the variety considered.

== Dialects ==
Sakao has undergone considerable phonological change and innovations, which make it utterly unintelligible to its closely related neighbours of Espiritu Santo. Evidence from the two dialects, however, shows that the innovation happened recently, perhaps within the last millennium. Thus for instance, comparing the following words with their cognates in its close relative Tolomako:

	Sakao	Tolomako	Proto-form
"louse"	nøð	na ɣutu	*na ɣutu
"chicken"	nɔð	na toa	*na toa
"four"	jɛð	βati	*βati
"to blow"	hy	suβi	*suβi

The main dialects of Sakao are Northern, or Port-Olry dialect, and Southern, or Hog-Harbour dialect. The Southern dialect is the more conservative one. It is characterized by the loss of most pretonic and posttonic vowels, resulting in consonant clusters unusual for an Oceanic language. The Northern dialect is characterized by its extensive use of epenthetic vowels, which have achieved phonemic status, resulting in what looks superficially like vowel harmony; the loss of the initial *n- of nouns, except in monosyllabic nouns (this *n- being a reflex of the common Austronesian article *na, fused to the nouns in Sakao); and the diphthongization of some word-final vowels.

Thus for instance Port-Olry has /œmœɣœɛ/ "fog, mist" where Hog-Harbour has /nmɣœ/.

Unless otherwise indicated, examples given here are in the Northern, Port-Olry, dialect.

== Phonology ==
Sakao vowels (partial)
	Front Unrounded	Front Rounded	Back Rounded
Close	i	y	u
Close-mid	e	ø	o
Open-mid	ɛ	œ	ɔ
Open	a		ɒ

In addition, Sakao has a close vowel /ɨ/ that is unspecified for being rounded or unrounded, front or back, and is always unstressed. It also has the two diphthongs /œɛ, ɒɔ/, whereas Tolomako has none.

Sakao consonants
	Labial	Dental	Alveolar	Dorsal	Glottal
Nasal	m		n	ŋ	
Plosive	p		t	k	
Fricative	β	ð	s	ɣ	h
Approximant	w		l	j	
Tap			ɾ		
Trill			r̝̊		

In addition, Sakao consonants may be long or short: /œβe/ "drum", /œββe/ "bed"

It is not clear if Sakao even has syllables; that is, whether trying to divide Sakao words into meaningful syllables is even possible. If it is, Sakao syllables would appear to be V (a vowel or diphthong) surrounded by any number of consonants: V /i/ "thou", CCVCCCC (?) /mhɛrtpr/ "having sung and stopped singing thou kept silent" [m- 2nd pers., hɛrt "to sing", -p perfective, -r continuous].

== Grammar ==
=== Number ===
Like Tolomako, Sakao distinguishes four numbers for its personal pronouns. However, they are not singular, dual, trial, plural, but singular, dual, paucal, plural. The Sakao paucal derives from the Tolomako trial, thus Tolomako i ɣire-tolu "they three", Sakao jørðœl "they, from three to ten" (jør and ðœl are regularly derivable from i ɣire < *i ɣira and *tolu). One says in Sakao jørðœl løn < *i ɣira-tolu lima "the five of them" which is, etymologically, "they three, five."

Substantives are not inflected for number, except kinship terms which distinguish singular and plural: ðjœɣ "my mother/aunt," rðjœɣ "my aunts;" walðyɣ "my child," raalðyɣ "my children." Likewise all demonstratives (pronouns, adjectives, even locatives): wa "this one," warɨr "these ones;" aðœŋœn mam "this person," aðœŋœn mamɨr "these persons;" ðað "here," ðaðɨr "in several places around here."

=== Deixis ===
Sakao has seven degrees of deixis.

=== Nouns ===
Sakao has inalienably possessed nouns, many of which are irregularly inflected:

Sakao	English
œsɨŋœ-ɣ	"my mouth"
œsɨŋœ-m	"thy mouth"
ɔsɨŋɔ-n	"his/her/its mouth"
œsœŋ-...	"...'s mouth"

Sakao	English
uly-ɣ	"my hair"
uly-m	"thy hair"
ulœ-n	"his/her/its hair"
nøl-...	"...'s hair"

Here "mouth" is variably œsɨŋœ-, ɔsɨŋɔ-, œsœŋ- and "hair" variably uly-, ulœ-, nøl-.

=== Syntax ===
Sakao has a suffix -ɨn that increases the valence of a verb (corresponding to applicative suffixes in other languages): it makes intransitive verbs transitive, and transitive verbs ditransitive. It the latter case, one argument may be the direct object and the other an instrument; the word order of the arguments is free, leaving context to disambiguate which is which:

mɨ-jil-ɨn a-ra a-mas
3SG-hits-TR ART-pig ART-club
"S/he hits (kills) the pig with a club"

This could also be mɨjilɨn amas ara.

The Sakao strategy involves polysynthetic syntax, as opposed to the isolating syntax of its neighbor Tolomako. For instance, the word 'pig' above could be incorporated into the verb, leaving a single external argument:

mɨ-jil-ra-p-ɨn a-mas
3SG-hit-pig-PFV-TR ART-club
"S/he hits (kills) the pig with a club"

Sakao polysynthesis can also involve compound verbs, each with its own instrument or object:

mɔ-sɔn-nɛs-hɔβ-r-ɨn a-ða ɛ-ðɛ
3SG-shoots-fish-follows-CONT-TR ART-bow ART-sea
"S/he kept on walking along the shore shooting fish with a bow."

Here aða "the bow" is the instrumental argument of sɔn "to shoot", and ɛðɛ "the sea" is the direct object of hoβ "to follow", which since they are combined into a single verb, are marked as ditransitive with the suffix -ɨn. Because sɔn "to shoot" has the incorporated object nɛs "fish", the first consonant geminates for ssɔn; ssɔn-nɛs, being part of one word, then reduces to ssɔnɛs.

- Tolomako language, for parallels to the above in a closely related but grammatically simpler language
