= Neveʻei language =

Austronesian language spoken in Vanuatu

Neveʻei
- Vinmavis
- Native to: Vanuatu
- Region: Central Malekula
- Ethnicity: 710 ethnic population (no date)
- Native speakers: 500 (2007)
- Language family: Austronesian: Malayo-Polynesian; Oceanic; Southern Oceanic; North-Central Vanuatu; Central Vanuatu; Malakula; Malakula Interior; Neveʻei

Language codes
- ISO 639-3: vnm
- Glottolog: vinm1237
- ELP: Vinmavis
- Neveʻei is not endangered according to the classification system of the UNESCO Atlas of the World's Languages in Danger

Neveʻei ([neveʔei]), also known as Vinmavis, is an Oceanic language of central Malekula, Vanuatu. (Note: Musgrave 2007, p. 3) There are around 500 primary speakers of Neveʻei and about 750 speakers in total.

Neveʻei was described for the first time by Jill Musgrave, in a monograph published in 2007: A grammar of Neveʻei, Vanuatu. This book is the source for the data and analyses below.

== Name of the language ==
The traditional name of the language, which is recognized by older speakers, is Neveʻei. However, the majority of younger speakers of Neveʻei do not use the traditional name and some are not even aware of it. Native speakers commonly refer to their language as Nabusian teget which literally means “our language” and in Bislama the language (Neveʻei) is called Lanwis Vinmavis “the language of Vinmavis”. Neveʻei is the traditional name for the language; Vinmavis is the name of one of the villages in which the language is spoken in (Lynch and Crowley 2001:83).

== Phonology ==
=== Phoneme inventory ===
Neveʻei contains 5 vowels and 20 consonants:

Vowel phonemes (Note: Musgrave 2007, p. 12)
	Front	Back
High	i	u
Mid	e	o
Low	a	

Consonant phonemes (Note: Musgrave 2007, p. 6.)
		Labio-velar	Labial	Alveolar	Velar	Glottal
Nasal		mʷ	m	n	ŋ	
Stop	Voiceless			t	k	ʔ
Stop	Voiced	bʷ	b	d	g	
Fricative		vʷ	v	s	x	h
Lateral				l		
Flap				ɾ		
Glide		w			j	

By comparison with other languages of the world, such a phoneme inventory classifies Neveʻei in the average range regarding vowels (5-6) as well as regarding consonants (22 ± 3). The consonant-vowel ratio classifies Neveʻei in the low band.

=== Phoneme properties ===
The table above indicates that the segments /t/, /k/ and /ʔ/ can be understood as voiceless stops at the alveolar, velar and glottal positions of articulation (Musgrave, 2007, p. 6). The segment /t/ can be understood as a voiceless alveolar stop in each position: initial, medial and final. For example, (Musgrave, 2007, p. 6):

/tabin/	[taᵐbɪn]	'grandfather'
/nebat/	[neᵐbat]	'vine variety'
/atl/	[atl]	'third'

The segment /k/ can be understood as a voiceless velar stop (Musgrave, 2007, p. 7). It rarely appears with non-borrowed lexical root forms and is only found within the root /niaɾekaʔa-n/ 'fin-CONST' (Musgrave, 2007, p. 7).

The segment /ʔ/ can be understood as a glottal stop and appears in all positions, for example (Musgrave, 2007, p. 7):

/ʔaʔan/	[ʔaʔan]	'eat'
/nibiʔiŋ/	[nɪᵐbiʔɪŋ]	'giant turban snail'
/bʷebaʔ/	[ᵐbʷeᵐbaʔ]	'hide'

The segments /bʷ/, /b/, /d/ and /g/ are voiced stops at the labio-velar, bilabial, alveolar and velar positions of articulation (Musgrave, 2007, p. 7). The labio-velar stop /bʷ/ can be understood as a prenasalised bilabial stop that is voiced, involving the rounding of lips and an audible labio-velar, semi-vowel offset (Musgrave, 2007, p. 7). It can be identified in initial as well as medial positions, for example (Musgrave, 2007, p. 7):

/bʷi-/	[ᵐbʷi-]	'3SG.IRR (verbal prefix)'
/abʷit-/	[aᵐbʷɪt-]	'2/3PL.IRR (verbal prefix)'
/nebʷelegen/	[neᵐbʷeleᵑgen]	'thigh'

The bilabial stop /b/ can be understood as a prenasalised stop that is voiced [ᵐb] found in initial and medial positions, for example (Musgrave, 2007, p. 7):

/baxah/	[ᵐbaxah ~ ᵐbaɣah]	'clean'
/nubuah/	[nuᵐbu(w)ah]	'pig'

The segment /d/ is an alveolar stop that differs from other prenasalised stops in that it can be found in all positions (initial, medial and final) (Musgrave, 2007, p. 7). In initial and medial positions, it appears as a prenasalised voiced stop [ⁿd]. Examples include (Musgrave, 2007, p. 7):

/doŋon/	[ⁿdoŋon]	'count'
/dedan/	[ⁿdeⁿdan]	'dive, swim underwater'

The phonetic variations of [ⁿd], [ⁿt], [ndɾ] and [nɾ] can be found when /d/ occurs in final position (Musgrave, 2007, p. 7). Examples include (Musgrave, 2007, p. 7):

/minsed/	[mɪntʃeⁿd ~ mɪntʃeⁿt ~ mɪntʃeⁿdɾ ~ mɪntʃenɾ]
/netarbad/	[netaɾᵐbaⁿd ~ netaɾᵐbaⁿt ~ netaɾᵐbaⁿdɾ ~ netaɾᵐbanɾ]

Finally, the velar stop /g/ can be understood as a voiced homorganic prenasalised stop [ᵑg] which can be found in initial and medial positions, for example (Musgrave, 2007, p. 7-8):

/gis/	[ᵑgɪs]	'squash, squeeze'
/gegeɾah/	[ᵑgeᵑgeɾah]	'drag, pull'

The following phonemes /mʷ/, /m/, /n/ and /ŋ/ are voiced nasals occurring at the labio-velar, bilabial, alveolar and velar positions of articulation (Musgrave, 2007, p. 8). The phoneme /mʷ/ appears in initial and medial positions, involving the rounding of lips and an audible labio-velar, semi-vowel offset. For example, (Musgrave, 2007, p. 8):

/mʷaʔam/	[mʷaʔam]	'sit'
/mamʷe/	[mamʷe]	'father'
/nemʷen/	[nemʷen]	'man'

The segment /m/ can be understood as a voiced bilabial nasal in each position, for example (Musgrave, 2007, p. 8):

/mesemah/	[mesemah]	'dry'
/nomomox/	[nomomox]	'woman'
/dam/	[ⁿdam]	'shout'

The segment /n/ can be understood as a voiced alveolar nasal in each position, for example (Musgrave, 2007, p. 8):

/nabuŋ/	[naᵐbuŋ]	'time, occasion, day'
/vanili/	[fanili]	'different, strange, unusual'
/dan/	[ⁿdan]	'go down, sink'

Finally, the segment /ŋ/ can be understood as a voiced velar nasal in each position, for example (Musgrave, 2007, p. 8):

/ŋaŋ/	[ŋaŋ]	'laugh'
/doŋon/	[ⁿdoŋon]	'count'
/naʔaibuŋ/	[naʔaiᵐbuŋ]	'my grandchild'

The phonemes /vʷ/, /v/, /s/, /x/ and /h/ can be understood as fricatives at the labio-velar, labio-dental, alveolar, velar and glottal positions of articulation (Musgrave, 2007, p. 8). The segment /vʷ/ is a labio-velar fricative involving the rounding of lips and an audible labio-velar, semi-vowel offset (Musgrave, 2007, p. 8). In initial position it is voiceless but can be optionally voiced intervocalically and does not appear in final position. For example, (Musgrave, 2007, p. 8-9):

/vʷelem/	[fʷelem]	'come'
/nevʷen/	[nefʷen ~ nevʷen]	'fruit'

The segment /v/ can be understood as a labio-dental fricative (Musgrave, 2007, p. 9). In initial and final positions it is voiceless however, it can be voiced intervocalically. In some cases such as in syllable-final positions before /m/ and /b/, /v/ can be understood as [p] while in other syllable-final positions, there is variation between [f] and [p] (Musgrave, 2007, p. 9). For example, (Musgrave, 2007, p. 9):

/vavu/	[fafu ~ favu]	'walk'
/navmolto/	[napmolto]	'kind of bird'
/tenev/	[tenef ~ tenep]	'yesterday'

The segment /s/ can be understood as a voiceless alveolar grooved fricative (Musgrave, 2007, p. 9). If /s/ follows /n/ it is understood as the affricate [tʃ] in initial and medial positions but is understood as [s] in final positions. For example, (Musgrave, 2007, p. 9):

/sido/	[sɪⁿdo]	'remember'
/bus/	[ᵐbus]	'speak, talk'
/nsev/	[ntʃef]	'cough'

The segment /x/ can be understood as a velar fricative that is voiceless in initial and final positions but can be optionally voiced intervocalically. For example, (Musgrave, 2007, p. 9):

/xus/	[xus]	'hit, kill'
/buxut/	[ᵐbuxut ~ ᵐbuɣut]	'inside'
/maʔabux/	[maʔaᵐbux]	'short'

The segment /h/ can be understood as a glottal fricative that is voiceless (Musgrave, 2007, p. 9). It is attested in final positions with the exception of /ahau/ (which means 'no' in answer to an affirmative question or 'yes' in answer to a negative question) (Musgrave, 2007, p. 9). It is attested in medial positions such as /eheʔ/ 'no' (Musgrave, 2007, p. 9). For example, (Musgrave, 2007, p. 9):

/vuluh/	[fuluh]	'bake in earth oven'
/ahau/	[ahau]	'no, yes (depending on the question)'
/eheʔ/	[eheʔ]	'no'

The segment /l/ can be understood as an alveolar lateral that is voiced (Musgrave, 2007, p. 9). It can be identified in all positions, for example (Musgrave, 2007, p. 9-10):

/lax/	[lax]	'hang'
/bʷeli/	[ᵐbʷeli]	'very, a lot'
/namul/	[namul]	'million'

The segment /ɾ/ can be understood as an alveolar flap that is voiced (Musgrave, 2007, p. 10). It can be identified in all positions, for example (Musgrave, 2007, p. 10):

/ɾaʔ/	[ɾaʔ]	'work (in garden)'
/viviɾoŋ/	[fifiɾoŋ ~ fiviɾoŋ]	'listen'
/boɾ/	[ᵐboɾ]	'deaf'

The glides /w/ and /j/ can only be found in syllable-initial positions (Musgrave, 2007, p. 10). The segment /w/ is s a semi-vowel that can be understood as a labio-velar approximate [w] that is voiced (Musgrave, 2007, p. 10). For example, (Musgrave, 2007, p. 10):

/wal/	[wal]	'because'
/muluwul/	[muluwul]	'round'
/lowi/	[lowi]	'out, away'

The segment /j/ is a semi-vowel that can be understood as a palatal approximate that is voiced (Musgrave, 2007, p. 10). For example, (Musgrave, 2007, p. 10):

/jaʔai/	[jaʔai]	'this person'
/joxjox/	[joxjox]	'vomit'
/nijim/	[nijɪm]	'house'

=== Consonant phoneme contrasts ===
The consonants that are phonetically similar in Neveʻei can be contrasted in the following ways (Musgrave, 2007, p. 10-11):

/b/	/beɾ/	'long, tall, deep'
/bʷ/	/bʷeɾ/	'possibly, maybe'

/m/	/melemal/	'have cramp'
/mʷ/	/mʷelemal/	'straight, correct'

/v/	/veɾi/	'outside'
/vʷ/	/vʷeɾi/	'saying (something), tell (story)'

/ʔ/	/meɾaʔ/	'get up, fly, jump up'
/h/	/meɾah/	'light (in weight)'

/h/	/veh/	'carry'
/∅/	/ve∅/	'what'

/ʔ/	/saʔ/	'go up'
/x/	/sax/	'not'

/d/	/madl/	'in three days' time'
/t/	/matl/	'thick, incorrect, uncircumcised'

/g/	/gu/	'you (pronoun)'
/k/	/ku-/	'2SG.IRR (verbal prefix)'

/ŋ/	/ŋe/	'the (demonstrative)'
/g/	/ge/	'the very one'

/l/	/nebal/	'hawk'
/ɾ/	/nebaɾ/	'blind person'
/n/	/neban/	'woman's headdress'

/w/	/wah/	'look'
/u/	/uah/	'day after tomorrow'

=== Neutralisation of labial consonants ===
Contrasts between plain labials /m/, /v/ and /b/ and labio-velars /mʷ/, /vʷ/ and /bʷ/ are neutralised in circumstances such as before front vowels /i/ and /e/. Examples include (Musgrave, 2007, p. 11):

/nimins/	'wooden stirring stick'
/nimʷinsi/	'star'
/meli/	'wilt'
/mʷelam/	'marked, spotted'
/visvis/	'teach'
/vʷisi/	'train yam vine'
/veh/	'carry'
/vʷelem/	'come'
/bʷiaŋ/	'all right'
/bial/	'all over the place, all sorts of things'
/bʷeɾ/	'maybe'
/beɾ/	'long, tall'

When these consonants precede rounded vowels such as /o/ and /u/ there is no contrast and only plain labials, examples include (Musgrave, 2007, p. 11):

/moŋ/	'proud'
/numuɾ/	'person'
/vov/	'rain'
/navusmo/	'white flying fox'
/boɾ/	'deaf'
/bubut/	'do quietly'

=== Vowel phonemes ===
The table above (Musgrave, 2007, p. 12) indicates that the vowel /i/ can be understood as a tense high front unrounded vowel (Musgrave, 2007, p. 12). When the vowel is followed by a nasal or a prenasalised consonant and in closed syllables that end in a non-liquid alveolar consonant, it can be understood as the lax high front vowel [ɪ] (Musgrave, 2007, p. 12). For example, (Musgrave, 2007, p. 12):

/ivah/	[ifah ~ ivah]	'four'
/nimin/	[nɪmɪn]	'bird'
/gis/	[ᵑgɪs]	'squash, squeeze'

The vowel /u/ can be understood as a high back rounded vowel. For example, (Musgrave, 2007, p. 13):

/utne/	[utne]	'here'
/lueh/	[lu(w)eh]	'tired'
/manuanu/	[manu(w)anu]	'rainbow'

The vowel /e/ can be understood as a mid front unrounded vowel. For example, (Musgrave, 2007, p. 13):

/etnaŋ/	[etnaŋ]	'that thing there'
/dedan/	[ⁿdeⁿdan]	'dive, swim underwater'
/mamʷe/	[mamʷe]	'father'

The vowel /o/ can be understood as a mid back rounded vowel. For example, (Musgrave, 2007, p. 13):

/oʔo/	[oʔo]	'yes'
/nomomox/	[nomomox]	'woman'
/noto/	[noto]	'chicken'

The vowel /a/ can be understood as a low front unrounded vowel. For example, (Musgrave, 2007, p. 13):

/alimin/	[alɪmɪn]	'fifth'
/mavis/	[mafɪs ~ mavɪs]	'white'
/naʔanian/	[naʔani(j)an]	'food'

=== Vowel phoneme contrasts ===
The forms listed below provide contrast between the five vowel phonemes in the Neveʻei language (Musgrave, 2007, p. 13):

/i/	/bir/	'fart audibly'
/u/	/bur-/	'1DU.IRR (verbal prefix)'
/e/	/ber/	'long, tall, deep'
/o/	/bor/	'deaf'
/a/	/bar/	'blind'

=== Phonotactics ===
==== Syllable Structure ====
The table below shows the various syllable structures attested in Neveʻei (Musgrave, 2007, p. 13-14):

V (vowel), C (consonant)	Neveʻei	English
V	/u-/ /i-/	'2SG.REAL(verbal prefix)' '3SG.REAL(verbal prefix)'
VC	/im/ /aɾ/	'only, just' 'they, them (pronoun)'
VCC	/itl/	'three'
CV	/vi/	'do, make'
CC	/tn/	'roast'
CCV	/nsu/ /tno/	'remove bark of' 'my (pronoun)'
CCVC	/nsev/ /tlel/	'cough' 'secret'
CVC	/dan/ /veh/	'go down, sink' 'carry'
CVCC	/matl/ /bans/	'thick' 'wander'
CCVCC	/nsutl/	'eight'

Syllables that consist of two vowels are also present, but are only used for specific reasons (Musgrave, 2007, p. 13). While most two non-like vowels can be used to form a morpheme, there are certain exceptions (Musgrave, 2007, p. 13).

Impermissible vowel sequences (Note: Musgrave 2007, (table 2.5), p. 19)
eo, oe	mid vowels cannot be followed by another mid vowel
ea	mid front vowel /e/ cannot be followed by /a/
iu, eu	front vowels /i/ and /e/ cannot be followed by /u/
ae, ao	low vowel /a/ cannot be followed by a mid vowel
ui	back vowel /u/ cannot be followed by /i/

==== Intramorphemic possibilities ====
Phonotactic patterns display various possibilities within morphemes (Musgrave, 2007, p. 14).

===== Single segments =====
In root-initial forms, any of the vowels are possible but initial vowels are not common in lexical items. Initial vowels, as displayed below, are found mostly in grammatical items, for example (Musgrave, 2007, p. 14):

/i/	'he/she/it'
/en/	'instrumental'
/aɾ/	'they, them'
/oʔo/	'yes'
/utnaŋ/	'there'

With the exception of /h/, many lexical root forms begin with any consonant (Musgrave, 2007, p. 14). In the final root position of the lexical item the following vowels are permitted: /i/, /e/, /o/ and /u/ (Musgrave, 2007, p. 14). For example, /viviɾi/ 'spit', /mamʷe/ 'father', /noto/ 'chicken' and /manuanu/ 'rainbow' (Musgrave, 2007, p. 12-13). The vowel /a/ does not occur in the root-final position unless there is an absence of a final nasal form. An example of this can be found within prepositions that end in /n/; /len/, /sakhan/ and /nsensan/, these often appear in spoken language without the final nasal when a noun phrase follows. In saying this however, when the preposition exists without the noun phrase following, the final nasal is essential (Musgrave, 2007, p. 14-15). Any consonant can appear in the root-final position of the lexical item with the exception of the prenasalised voiced stops /b^{w}/, /b/ and /g/ and labio-velars /v^{w}/ and /m^{w}/ (Musgrave, 2007, p. 15). The glottal fricative /h/ is most commonly found in the root-final position for example /bʷebaʔ/ 'hide' (Musgrave, 2007, p. 7).

=== Stress ===
In Neveʻei, stress is predictable in which the primary stress lies on the penultimate syllable where the last two syllables contain single vowels, for example (Musgrave, 2007, p. 21):

/ˈvenox/	'steal'
/meˈtabux/	'morning'
/ˈmoxot/	'torn, ripped'
/ˈnowi/	'water'

== Orthography ==
Neveʻei does not have a traditional orthography. Like elsewhere in Vanuatu, most speakers of Neveʻei write using either Bislama, English or sometimes French. However, Neveʻei is sometimes used in writing for certain special occasions, such as the composition of hymns, recording details of family history, and land ownership. (Note: Musgrave 2007, p. 28) Due to the lack of stable spelling conventions for Neveʻei, individuals differ in the choice of orthographical methods when transcribing unusual phonemes. In the past efforts had been made to create a standard orthography, but the current situation is unknown.

== Morpho-syntax ==
=== Pronouns ===
==== Independent pronouns ====
In Neveʻei, independent pronouns can function as verbal subjects, as verbal and prepositional objects, and as pronominal possessors following directly possessed nouns. Independent pronouns inflect according to person and number (singular, dual, or non-singular), but not according to case or grammatical gender. First person pronouns also distinguish between inclusive and exclusive in the dual and non-singular forms. (Note: Musgrave 2007, p. 29)

Independent pronouns
	Singular	Dual	Non-singular
1st inclusive	no	getdru	get
1st exclusive	no	gememru	gemem
2nd	gu	gemru	gem
3rd	i	ardru	ar

Although Neveʻei has a distinction between dual and plural, the forms listed as non-singular can be used to refer to both dual and plural subjects. In these cases, even when the non-singular independent pronoun is used, the dual verbal prefix will be used. (Note: Musgrave 2007, p. 29-30)

Example: (Note: Musgrave 2007, p. 30)

gemem bwera-vu ran nourour toro
1NONSG.EXCL 1DU.IRR-go GOAL island big
"We (two) will go to the mainland."

gemem bwit-tovu ran nourour toro
1NONSG.EXCL 1PL.IRR-go GOAL island big
"We (all) will go to the mainland."

The pronominal forms listed as dual in the table are instead used in cases where there is a pragmatic contrast with singular or plural reference, or where two participants are acting together rather than separately. (Note: Musgrave 2007, p. 30)

Example:

ar ar-vwelem
3NONSG 3DU.REAL-come
"They (two) came."

ardru ar-vwelem
3DU 3DU.REAL-come
"They (two) came together."

==== Possessive pronouns ====
Neveʻei contains a set of possessive postmodifiers which are used as possessive adjuncts with indirectly possessed nouns. The possessive pronouns (used when the possessed noun is not overtly expressed) are derived from these possessive postmodifiers by adding the prefix ti-, although this may be omitted in some forms. Like the independent pronouns, these pronominal forms indicate person and number, and the non-singular forms may be used for dual referents. These pronominal forms also have an inclusive/exclusive distinction. Additionally, possessive postmodifiers can take singular, dual and non-singular forms, similar to independent pronouns, in which case the non-singular form is often employed for both dual and plural referents (Musgrave, 2007).

Possessive postmodifiers (Note: Musgrave 2007, p. 31)
	Singular	Dual	Non-singular
1st inclusive	tno	tegetdru	teget
1st excusive	tno	tegememru	tegemem
2nd	tugu	tegemru	tegem
3rd	ti	terdru	ter

Possessive pronouns
	Singular	Dual	Non-singular
1st inclusive	titno	(ti)tegetdru	(ti)teget
1st excusive	titno	(ti)tegememru	(ti)tegemem
2nd	(ti)tugu	tegemru	(ti)tegem
3rd	titi	titerdru	titer

Example: (Note: Musgrave 2007, p. 30-31)

gu ke-takh natitimwen teget bwe-sevakh
2SG 2SG.IRR-take boy 1NONSG.INCL.POSS 3SG.IRR-one
"You will take one of our boys."

get tuan ba-khal titi
1NONSG.INCL INDEF 3SG.IRR-dig 3SG.POSS
"Each of us will dig his own."

==== Indefinite pronouns ====
Neveʻei also contains a set of indefinite pronouns which function as both verbals subjects and objects, with separate forms in fast and slow speech. (Note: Musgrave 2007, p. 32)

Slow speech	Fast speech	
numuruan	numurwan	"somebody, someone"
nusutuan	nusutwan	"something"
nisituan	nisitwan	"something"
nei mang (mi)		"who, whoever"
Neveʻei mang (mi)		"what, whatever"

Example: (Note: Musgrave 2007 p. 62)

nisit nganga' i-leh nusutwan
thing little 3SG.REAL-see something
"The child saw something"

=== Nouns ===
In Neveʻei, similar to most Oceanic Languages, nouns do not change. (Note: Musgrave 2007, p. 33) The inflection of nouns by numbers does not occur and instead postmodifiers are used. Only two types of possession exist in Neveʻei. These are direct and indirect. For a directly possessed noun, a suffix is attached directly to the noun itself and for an indirectly possessed noun, a possessive postmodifier appears before the noun.

Direct possession (Note: Musgrave 2007, (table 3.5), p. 33)	Indirect possession
netal-ung leg-1SG my leg	noang tno canoe 1SG.POSS my canoe

Most often, directly possessed nouns have stems ending in vowels, however there are also instances in which stems ending in non-nasal alveolar consonants t, s, l and r occur (Musgrave, 2007). The following table provides examples of both instances (Musgrave, 2007 p. 33):

Vowel Endings	Consonant Endings
khava - 'brother, friend'	nagalel - 'rib, side (of body)
ninsibi - 'finger, toe claw (of bird/chicken)'	netal - 'foot, leg, behind leg (of animal)'
nobologo - 'bone'	nibis - 'tail'

(More on directly possessed nouns below: 5.1 Directly possessed nouns)

==== Noun Derivation ====
In Neveʻei complex nouns can be formed by compounding or affixation. (Note: Musgrave 2007, p. 36) Compounding involves combining a noun root with either a noun or verb root. And affixation involves deriving nouns from verbs, a process in which a simulfix is added to the verb stem.

=== Numerals ===
==== Cardinal Numerals (numerals that denote quantity) ====
Neveʻei uses a decimal (base 10) system for numbers, however many young people are only familiar with one to ten, so higher value numerals are often expressed using methods derived from Bislama. (Note: Musgrave 2007, p. 40)

1	2	3	4	5	6	7	8	9	10
sevakh	iru	itl	ivah	ilim	nsouh	nsuru	nsutl	nsavah	nangavil (sevakh) / vungavil

10 is an interesting number in Neveʻei because it can be either nangavil or nangavil sevkh. (Note: Musgrave 2007, p. 41) Also note that nangavil is used for the actual number 10 when counting and vungavil is used to modify a phrase or noun. An example would be noang vungavil which translates to "10 canoes" in English.

=== Person markers ===
In Neveʻei, subject verbal prefixes are obligatory and indicate the person and number of the subject. There are two complete sets of prefixes: one for realis mood and the other for irrealis. Unlike the pronoun systems, there is no distinction between inclusive and exclusive first person, and dual prefixes are always used with dual referents. There is no set of affixes encoding the person and number of objects. Vowels in some of these prefixes may change according to the first vowel in the verb stem; this is a process of progressive assimilation at a distance. (Note: Musgrave 2007, p. 44-45)

prefixes (Note: Musgrave 2007, p. 44)
	Realis			Irrealis		
	Singular	Dual	Plural	Singular	Dual	Plural
1st	nV-	er-	it-	nVbwV-	bwVr-	bwit-
2nd	u-	ar-	at-	kV-	abwVr-	abwit-
3rd	i-/∅-			bwV-		

Example: (Note: Musgrave 2007, p. 46)

bwer-ngang
1DU.IRR-laugh
"we (both) will laugh"

er-ngang
1DU.REAL-laugh
"we (both) laugh"

ar-ngang
2/3DU.REAL-laugh
"you/they (both) laugh"

abwer-ngang
2/3DU.IRR-laugh
"you/they (both) will laugh"

The third person singular realis prefix is sometimes realised as ∅- in various environments. This is more common with certain verbs, especially verbs where the stem begins with s.

Example: (Note: Musgrave 2007, p. 45)

numur bweradang ∅-sakh
person real 3SG.REAL-is.not
"...not a real person."

Verbal prefixes ending in t also often lose the t before verb roots beginning with s.

Example:

i-sav
1PL.REAL-dance
"We (all) dance"

=== Reduplication in Neveʻei ===
Reduplication is most commonly used in Neveʻei to indicate things such as intensity, prohibition, reciprocity and habitual aspects and is also sometimes used in order to differentiate between transitive and intransitive forms of a verb. (Note: Musgrave 2007, p. 54) The most common method of reduplication in Neveʻei is the repeating of the first syllable in the verb stem.

I-bans-bans do.
3SG.REAL-REDUP-wander.about a.little
(S)he wandered about a bit.

This example shows reduplication to express a habitual aspect.

Abur-su-khus-khus-si ∅
2DU.IRR-NEG1-REDUP-kill-NEG2 3SG
Do not kill it.

This example shows reduplication to express prohibition.

Ar are-te-teri ar.
2NONSG 3DU.REAL-REDUP-cut 3NONSG
They cut each other.

This example shows reduplication to express reciprocity.

Ar ar-yang-yangwal ar.
3NONSG 3DU.REAL-REDUP-like 3NONSG
They like each other.

This example shows reduplication to express intensity.

=== Transitive suffix ===
In Neveʻei transitive and intransitive verbs are represented by a technique in which intransitive verbs become transitive through the addition of a suffix -V(vowel)n to the end of an intransitive verb stem. (Note: Musgrave 2007, (table 3.11), p. 56)

The suffix to make verbs transitive has three allomorphs. They are:

- -on ~ -en (used for verb stems ending in oC (consonant)).
- -an ~ -en (used for verb stems ending in aC (consonant) where the consonant is also glottal or velar).
- -en (used elsewhere).

Intransitive	Transitive
nonong "finish"	nonong-on ~ nonong-en "finish"
ngang "laugh"	ngang-an ~ ngang-en "laugh at"
dedan "dive"	dedan-en "dive for"

Apart from addition of the suffix, there are two other methods to differentiate between intransitive and transitive verbs.

One other way is for both transitive and intransitive verbs to have very different forms of expression.

	Intransitive	Transitive
"eat"	ʻaʻan	khan
"steal"	vevenaʻ	venokh
"burn"	lililmin	vang do

The final way for intransitive and transitive verbs to differentiate from each other is through reduplication. (Note: Musgrave 2007, p. 57)

	Transitive (Note: Musgrave 2007, (table 3.12), p. 57)	Intransitive
"turn around"	vilih	vil-vilih
"buy"	vul	vul-vul
"drink"	min	min-min
"copulate (with)"	ʻav	ʻav-ʻav

=== Negation ===
In Neveʻei negation is marked by the simulfixes sV- ... -si 'not' and sV- ... -vang(an) 'not yet'. The prefixed element of the negative marker directly follows the subject prefix and precedes the verb stem while the suffixed element is always the final morpheme of the verb. (Note: Musgrave 2007, p. 51) The prefixed element sV- is used in both negative simulfixes with the realisation of V- depending on a process of vowel harmony. The suffixed element -si remains the same following both transitive and intransitive verbs, however the -vang(an) element from the other simulfix is -vang following intransitive verbs and -vang-an (here -an can be described as a realisation of the transitive suffix -Vn) after transitive verbs. (Note: Musgrave 2007, p. 52)

The following examples (Note: Musgrave 2007, (example 3.56a-d), p. 52) show how the negative simulfixes are used with the intransitive verb nonong 'finish' and the transitive equivalent nonong-on 'finish (something)'.

No-so-nonong-si.
1SG.REAL-NEG1-finish-NEG2
'I haven't finished.'

No-so-nonong-vang.
1SG.REAL-NEG1-finish-NEG2
'I haven't finished yet.'

No-so-nonong-on-si nemagarian tno.
1SG.REAL-NEG1-finish-TR-NEG2 work 1SG.POSS
'I haven't finished my work.'

No-so-nonong-on-vang-an nemagarian tno.
1SG.REAL-NEG1-finish-TR-NEG2-TR work 1SG.POSS
'I haven't finished my work yet.'

When a sentence containing a verb with the completive suffix -i is negated the simulfix usually replaces the completive suffix as in the following example where mah-i becomes mah-vang-an in the negative version. (Note: Musgrove 2007, (examples 3.62-3), p. 54)

Ne-vweri mah-i ∅
1SG.REAL-say finish.doing-COMP 3SG
'I've already said it.'

Ne-se-vweri mah-vang-an ∅
1SG.REAL-NEG1-say finish.doing-NEG2-TR 3SG
'I haven't said it yet.'

==== Complex Verbs ====
Neveʻei allows for inflected verb stems to consist of a sequence of two or more stems. These verbs in sequence are negated as a single unit with the negative prefix preceding the first verb stem and the suffix following the final verb stem in the sequence. (Note: Musgrave 2007, pp. 77-78)

For example: (Note: Musgrave 2007, (examples 5.2b, 5.4a), p. 78)

I-si-yel totovung-si.
3SG.REAL-NEG1-sing try-NEG2
'(S)he didn't try to sing.'

I-so-rogulel lieh mo-si bwe-sa`
3SG.REAL-NEG1-able again do.any.more-NEG2 3SG.IRR-go.up
'he couldn't go up any more'

===== Auxiliaries =====
The following verbs in Neveʻei are attested as both as independent verbs and as serial verbs expressing aspect. (Note: Musgrave 2007, p. 88)

Core layer aspectual auxiliaries (Note: Musgrave 2007, (table 5.5), p. 88)
magar(-en)	'progressive'
mera`	'inceptive'
tokh	'habitual'
vwer	'actual'

When constructions containing the aspectual auxiliaries (with the exception of vwer for which there are no examples of negated constructions) are negated the main verb carries the negative simulfix while the auxiliary appears in the affirmative. (Note: Musgrave 2007, p. 91) Illustrated in the following example containing the auxiliary mera` 'inceptive' and the verb stem rong 'listen'. (Note: Musgrave 2007, (example 5.29c), p. 91)

U-mera` u-son-rong do-si.
2SG.REAL-INCEP 2SG.REAL-NEG1-listen a.little-NEG2
'Then you didn't listen at all.'

Neveʻei also contains the following verbs that are attested as both independent verbs and serial verbs expressing modality. (Note: Musgrave 2007, p. 92)

Core layer modal auxiliaries (Note: Musgrove 2007, (table 5.6), p. 92)
rogulel	'abilitative'
yangwal	'desiderative'
sisi	'anti-desiderative'
vwer	'intentional'

In contrast with the negation pattern for the aspectual auxiliaries the modal auxiliaries carry the negative simulfix while the main verb has affirmative polarity as shown in the following examples. (Note: Musgrave 2007, (example 5.35a-b), p. 93)

No-so-rogulel-si nebwe-lahk.
1SG.REAL-NEG1-ABIL-NEG2 1SG.IRR-hang
'I can't hang.'

Ni-si-yangwal-si nebwe-vweri nabusian nene.
1SG.REAL-NEG1-DESID-NEG2 1SG.IRR-say story DEM
'I don't want to tell this story.'

Even though yangwai 'desiderative' can be negated as seen in the previous example there is also the separate verb sisi that expresses anti-desiderative modality. As is the case when it appears as an aspectual auxiliary vwer also cannot be negated when used to express intentional modality instead sisi is used to express negative intention. (Note: Musgrove 2007, p. 94)

===== Directional serial verbs =====
To negate directional serial constructions only the first verb carries the simulfix as in the following example where vavu 'walk' carries the negation and the directional verb vu 'thither' appears in the affirmative. (Note: Musgrove 2007, (example 5.43f), p. 96)

I-sa-vavu-si (i-)vu len niyim.
3SG.REAL-NEG1-walk-NEG2 3SG.REAL-thither GOAL house
'He didn't walk there to the house.'

== Demonstratives and Spatial Deictics ==
=== Demonstratives ===
There are five determiners in Neveʻei: the proximate demonstrative nene, the intermediate demonstrative nenana, and the distant demonstrative nenokhoi, the anaphoric demonstrative nge, and the indefinite postmodifier tuan.

Proximate	Intermediate	Distant	Anaphoric
nene	nenang	nenokhoi	nge
'this'	'that'	'that'	'the'
near	middle distance	far away	mentioned previously

The demonstratives show a three-way distinction in space and time: near, intermediate, and distant, as well as an anaphoric demonstrative used for items already mentioned. This three-way distinction is common in the Pacific, with a mean 2.7 distance contrasts. A three-way distinction is also the most common form of deixis among languages in and around Vanuatu, with three of the four languages cited in the World Atlas of Language Structures Online (WALS) having a three-way distinction.

Much like the vast majority of languages around Vanuatu and neighbouring Austronesian speaking regions, Neveʻei follows a Noun-Demonstrative pattern, where a demonstrative follows the noun head and any adjectival or possessive postmodifiers.

Both a three-way distinction and the Noun-Demonstrative pattern are thought to be features retained by Neveʻei from Proto-Oceanic.

In Neveʻei, nouns with indefinite reference are given the indefinite postmodifier tuan, while nouns with definite reference are either given the appropriate demonstrative or left unmarked. Musgrave suggests that since many Neveʻei nouns begin with nV, the Proto-Oceanic article *na attached to the noun and became a part of the noun root, meaning speakers no longer needed to mark the definite article.

The three non-anaphoric forms of the demonstrative have the same initial element ne-, similar to how nouns often appear in the language. The demonstratives also have final forms identical to how Neveʻei indicates other locational forms which also have three-way distinctions, for example, utne, 'in this place, here', utnang, 'in that place, there', and utnokhoi, 'in that place, over there'.

The demonstrative nene indicates that the noun is close to the speaker.

Ne-leh do nisit nganga' nene len nukht-n nubu utnokhoi
1SG.REAL-see hit thing little DEM LOC clump-CONST bamboo over.there
'I found this child in the clump of bamboo over there.'

The demonstrative nenang is most commonly used to mark temporal orientation rather than spatial.

Nemwen nenang utnen i-lam i-veh bubu tegem ar.
male DEM when 3SG.REAL-big 3SG.REAL-beget ancestor 2NONSG.POSS PL
'That boy when he grew big, he begat children … your ancestors.'

The demonstrative nge is an anaphoric demonstrative meaning it is used to refer to a noun that has already been introduced. It is identical in form to the pronominal trace, which marks the original site of a noun phrase in a relative clause.

At-tokh ran nourour nganga' tuan. Nourour nganga' nge i-tokh do ...
3PL.REAL-exist LOC island little INDEF island little DEM 3SG.REAL-stay hit ...
'They lived on an islet. The islet is located …'

The anaphoric demonstrative cannot only be used after a noun has been marked by tuan to be used in later references. In the example above, natuturmwitiyilian 'story' is first modified by a relative clause marked by nen, then later referred to with the anaphoric demonstrative.

Natuturmwitiyilian nen ne-vwer nebwe-vweri lieh natuturmwitiyilian nge
story REL 1SG.REAL-INTEN 1SG.IRR-tell again story DEM
'The story, which I want to tell again, the story…'

Grammatically, the anaphoric demonstrative nge behaves differently from the three other demonstratives in Neveʻei in that it can only ever function as a nominal postmodifier, while the other determiners can occur as both nominal postmodifiers and nominal phrase heads. This example shows the proximate demonstrative nene used as the head of a nominal phrase:

Ni-yangwal nebwe-vwer-vwer sur natuturmwitiyilian tuan. Nene i-vwer-vwer bisah Ø-medang nani i-vwelwm sakhan get
1SG.REAL-DESID 1SG.REAL.IRR-REDUP-talk about story INDEF DEM 3SG.REAL-REDUP-say clear 3SG.REAL-how coconut 3SG.REAL-come GOAL 1NONSG.INCL
'I want to tell a story. This one explains how the coconut came to us.'

=== Spatial Deictics ===
==== Adverbial Phrases ====
Spatial deictics are common in Neveʻei, especially in adverbials which share endings with a corresponding demonstrative:

Proximate	Intermediate	Distant
utne / utnen ie 'here' (by the speaker)	utnang / utnen iang 'there' (near the listener)	utnokhoi / utnen yokhoi 'over there' (away from both speaker and listener)

Each of the final elements of both forms of these adverbs are identical to the demonstratives nene 'this', nenang 'that', and nenokhoi, 'that, over there'. In the second adverbial in each category takes the form utnen 'place where' followed by the proximate, intermediate, or distant form ie, iang, or yokhoi.

In the following examples, a place adverbial appears in the clause-final position as a non-core argument:

Tokhi utnen get er-vwelem utne…
always when 1NONSG.INCL 1DU.REAL-come here
'Always when we come here.'

Abor-tokh drong {utnen ie}
2DU.IRR-stay keep.on.doing here
'Just stay here.'

Ar-to nivis nge ar utnang
3DU.REAL-put bow DEM PL there
'They put the bows there.'

Nedam i-mour utnokhai
yam 3SG.REAL-grow there
'The yam grows over there.'

Both the adverbial and the locative adverb are acceptable in Neveʻei, as shown in the first example where the locative adverb utne is used to mean 'here' and the second example, which uses the adverbial utnen ie.

Place adverbials can also occur in a clause-initial position:

Utne i-moul
here 3SG.REAL-bad
'Here (in this place) it is bad.'

==== Place Adverbs ====
The adverbials listed above can be combined with place adverbs to form new meanings. For example; the adverbs ra'ai 'above' and retan 'below', which provide information about vertical location, such as speaking from a high position like the top of a hill or a low position like at the base of a tree.

Proximate	Intermediate	Distant
ra'ai utne / ra'ai utnen ie 'up here'	ra'ai utnang / ra'ai utnen iang 'up there'	ra'ai utnokhoi / ra'ai utnen yokhoi 'way up there'
retan utne / retan utnen ie 'down here'	retan utnang / retan utnen iang 'down there	retan utnokhain / retan utnen yokhoi 'way down there'

There also exists a form that does not feature deixis lo 'below', specifically used to mean 'down below to the coast' such as in:

nen lam i-dah i-vu len netah lo.
REL big 3SG.REAL-go.down 3SG.REAL-thither GOAL sea below
The big one (brother) went down there to the sea below.

The proximate and intermediate final elements of the proximate and intermediate demonstratives nene 'this' and nenang 'that' are also shared by the locational and temporal forms ie 'this here', iang 'that there', itie 'now, at this time', and itiang 'then, at that time'.

== Adnominal and Pronominal Possession ==
=== Directly possessed nouns ===
Extending on directly possessed noun stems in section 4.2. Nouns, when these directly possessed nouns appear to have a nominal possessor that is when the directly possessed nouns do not refer to a particular possessor, a suffix which is identical to the person singular pronominal suffix –n, known as a construct suffix (Musgrave, 2007). The construct suffixes are depicted in the table below:

	After consonant	After vowels
1st person	-ung/-ing	-ng
2nd person	-um/im	-m
3rd person	-n	-n

The construct suffix –ing/im is attached to –iC (where C is consonant) root stems, whereas –ung/um suffixes follow noun stem roots ending in all other consonants. Additionally, noun roots that end in a vowel have the suffix –ng/-m attached.

Some examples from Musgrave's (2007, p. 34) grammar include:

- nemelnibis-ing – 'my saliva'
- nemelnibis-im – 'your saliva'
- nemelnibis-n – 'his/her saliva'

Unlike many other languages closely related to Neveʻei, the patterns for directly suffixed nouns are not as complicated. As many of the closely related languages have distinct pronominal suffixes that correspond to both singular and non-singular pronouns independent pronouns, Neveʻei is moving away from a rigid difference between how pronominal and nominal possession is demonstrated (Musgrave, 2007).

According to Musgrave's (2007) grammar findings, when found without a reference to a specific possessor, directly possessed nouns are displayed in their construct form, and the third person non-singular independent pronoun –ar and the plural postmodifier –ar are identical, their semantics must be worked out in context. For instance, depending on the context nat-n ar could be translated to 'the children', with the plural postmodifier, or 'their children', possession (Musgrave, 2007, p. 35).

E.g.:

{… ar-sido} etenen ar-vweri en nat-n ar.
3DU.REAL-remember what 3DU.REAL-say GOAL child-CONST PL/3NONSG.POSS
'… they remembered what they said to the children/their children'

However, determining the differences between the uses of the singular pronominal possessor constructions, it has been found that pronominal suffix formations are used more often for third person singular possessors and for first person singular possessors as a term of address, in narratives (Musgrave, 2007).

=== Nominal possession ===
==== Nominal possessive pronouns ====
Extending on aforementioned possessive pronoun information, when the nominal phrase head is taken by a possessive pronoun, the postmodifiers used are determiners and plural postmodifiers. This is explained in the following formula:

POSSESSIVE PRONOUN + (DETERMINER) + (PLURAL POSTMODIFIER)

For example, the possessive pronouns (ti)tugu precedes the determiner nge:

Uten gu u-sa-khal-si tugu nge
{} 2SG 2SG.REAL-NEG1-dig-NEG2 2NONSG.POSS DEM
'If you don't dig yours…'

(Musgrave, 2007, p. 61)

When indefinite pronouns inhabit the nominal phrase head, possessive postmodifiers, determiners and plural postmodifiers are the only postmodifiers employed. As such, they follow the following formula:

INDEFINITE PRONOUN + (POSSESSIVE POSTMODIFIER) + (DETERMINER) + (PLURAL POSTMODIFIER)

Musgrave (2007, p. 62) demonstrates an example of this construction as follows: the indefinite pronoun nusutwan precedes the possessive postmodifier ter and the plural postmodifier ar.

Ara-vu ar-takh nusutwan ter ar
3DU.REAL-go 3DU.REAL-take something 3NONSG.POSS PL
'They a went and took their things'

==== Nominal possessive postmodifiers ====
Indirectly possessed nouns are unable to take a possessive suffix, and therefore adopt possessive modifier forms instead. An example of this is found in Musgrave's (2007) grammar.

I-leh yokhoi nang ti i-vanili mang
3SG.REAL-see that.person mother SG.POSS 3SG.REAL-different very.much
'He saw that person's mother was very different'

=== Complex possessive constructions ===
Musgrave's (2007) grammar book identifies that Neveʻei, like most languages, has two main types of possession, direct and indirect possession. The constructions of possession show how the language has deviated from typical rules of grammar from Proto Oceanic language system and other languages of Vanuatu. A main difference identified in Musgrave's (2007) grammar is that Neveʻei does not juxtapose different indirect possessive subtypes and its direct possessive forms are reduced to singular pronominal possessors, as opposed to the Proto Oceanic system.

==== Direct possessive constructions ====
As previously discussed, if a directly possessed noun has a nominal possessor, in its construct form, a possessor follows the directly possessed nouns. These directly possessed nouns have a very close semantic relationship between the referent of the possessed and possessor nouns, referred to as inalienable possession (Musgrave, 2007). An inalienable relationship describes a situation when the possessed noun does not exist separately from the possessor. This notion is exhibited by the following formula:

POSSESSED NOUN + POSSESSOR NOUN + (POSSESSOR NOUN MODIFIERS) + (POSSESSED NOUN POSTMODIFIERS)

Consequently, no postmodifiers belonging to the directly possessed noun can come between it and the nominal possessor.

Most often the categories of alienable possessive constructions relate to kin/relationship terms, parts of a plant, body parts of humans and animals etc. Examples from Musgrave (2007, p. 71) are listed below.

	Neveʻei	English
Kinship	na'aibi-n nat-n tabi-n	'grandchild' 'child' 'grandfather
Animal/human body parts	na'adle-n na-avera-n neleme-n	'egg (of bird or turtle, roe (of fish)' 'wing' 'tongue'
Plant parts	na'ansemwe-n nokhora-n netevi-n	'stem (of leaf, fruit) 'root' 'shoot (of a plant)'
Bodily products	nemakha-n nemwetebwe-n	'urine' 'excrement'

A possessor noun can be moved to the beginning of the possessive construction in order to show the prominence of the noun. Additionally, the presence or absence of a postmodifier behind the possessor noun depends on the level of animacy, consequently highly animate possessors (such as animals and humans) allow the directly possessed noun to follow with or without intervening postmodifiers. On the contrary, trees and plants etc. are considered less animate and therefore a postmodifier must follow the possessor noun and precede the possessed noun. Two formula's describe these animate constructions below (Musgrave, 2007, p. 72):

- Highly animate: POSSESSOR NOUN+ (POSSESSOR NOUN POSTMODIFIERS) + POSSESSED NOUN + (POSSESSED NOUN POSTMODIFIERS)

nemwat ar nebat-n at-met.
snake PL head-CONST 3PL.REAL-black
'The snakes' heads are black.'

(Musgrave, 2007, p. 72)

- Less animate: [POSSESSOR NOUN + POSSESSOR POSTMODIFIERS + POSSESSED NOUN + (POSSESSED NOUN POSTMODIFIERS)

nakhankhan nge nevwene-n sevakh
pawpaw DEM fruit-CONST one
'one fruit of the pawpaw'

==== Indirect possessive constructions ====
Similarly to the inalienable relationship of directly suffixed possessed nouns, indirectly possessed nouns can also establish an inalienable relationship. This fact would suggest there is some overlap between the semantic features of alienable and inalienable relationships.

The following examples from Musgrave (2007, p. 73) demonstrate indirectly possessed nouns that may be expected to establish a close semantic or inalienable relationship with their noun possessors.

- Mamwe – 'father, father's sister's son'
- Mamwilam – 'father's eldest brother'
- Nang – 'mother, mother's sister, father's sister's son's wife'
- Nang tokhtokh – 'mother's elder sister'

When an indirectly possessed noun has a pronominal possessor, it precedes a possessive postmodifier. However, there are two outcomes for a possessive construction when an indirectly possessed noun takes a nominal possessor.

In the first construction the possessive postmodifier agrees with the number of the possessor noun, establishing a semantic relationship that is distant or alienable, as the possessed noun exists independently of the possessor (adnominal possession). For example, (Musgrave, 2007, p. 73):

POSSESSED NOUN + POSSESSIVE POSTMODIFIER + POSSESSOR NOUN + (POSTMODIFIERS)

libakh ti matoro
dog 3NONSG.POSS old.man
'the old man's dog.'

POSSESSOR NOUN + (POSTMODIFIERS) + POSSESSED NOUN + POSSESSIVE POSTMODIFIER

matoro libakh ti
old.man dog 3SG.POSS
'the old man's dog.'

Another indirect possessive construction includes a possessive marker nen, which acts similarly to a relativiser. The formula demonstrates that nen is found in between the possessed nominal and the possessor nominal.

POSSESSED NOUN + NEN + POSSESSOR NOUN + (POSSESSOR POSTMODIFIERS) + (POSSESSED POSTMODIFIERS)

These constructions often pertain to a certain semantic category: purposive relationships, habitual relations and possession of body parts. In the following example from Musgrave (2007, p. 75), the possessed noun is a person and the possessor noun in an occupation:

numur nen navisvisian
person POSS teaching
'teacher'

While some body parts are directly possessed nouns, some body parts (such as internal organs, bodily exudations etc.) are indirectly possessed nouns and most often pertain to an alienable semantic relationship.

nidri nen libakh
blood POSS dog
'the dog's blood'

nowi nen netal-n
water POSS leg-CONST
'leg vains'

(Musgrave, 2007, p. 75)

== Notes ==
- References from: Musgrave, J. (2007). A grammar of Neveʻei, Vanuatu. Canberra: Pacific Linguistics.
