= Port Vato language =

Austronesian language spoken in Vanuatu

Port Vato
- Daakie
- Native to: Vanuatu
- Region: Ambrym Island
- Native speakers: 1,300 (2001)
- Language family: Austronesian: Malayo-Polynesian; Oceanic; Southern Oceanic; North-Central Vanuatu; Central Vanuatu; Port Vato

Language codes
- ISO 639-3: ptv
- Glottolog: port1286
- Port Vato is not endangered according to the classification system of the UNESCO Atlas of the World's Languages in Danger

Port Vato, locally known as Daakie, is a language of Ambrym Island, Vanuatu.
