= Tolomako language =

Austronesian language spoken in Vanuatu

Tolomako
- Bigbay
- Native to: Vanuatu
- Region: Big Bay, Espiritu Santo Island
- Native speakers: 900 (2001)
- Language family: Austronesian: Malayo-Polynesian; Oceanic; Southern Oceanic; North-Central Vanuatu; North Vanuatu; Espiritu Santo; Tolomako
- Dialects: Tolomako proper; Tsuréviu

Language codes
- ISO 639-3: tlm
- Glottolog: tolo1255
- ELP: Tolomako
- Tolomako is classified as Definitely Endangered by the UNESCO Atlas of the World's Languages in Danger.

Tolomako (also called Bigbay) is a language of the Oceanic subgroup of Austronesian languages. It is spoken on Santo island in Vanuatu.

== Characteristics ==
It distinguishes four numbers for its personal pronouns: singular, dual, trial, plural. Its verbs have no tense or aspect marking, but two moods, realis and irrealis. Substantives and numerals also have the same two moods. E.g.

na tatsua mo tea mo tsoa
REALIS person REALIS one REALIS {not to be}
Someone is missing

te tatsua i tea mo tsoa
IRREALIS person IRREALIS one REALIS {not to be}
There is nobody.

Tolomako proper is characterized by having dentals where the proto-language had labials before front vowels. It shares this feature with Sakao, but not with its dialect Tsureviu, which is otherwise very close. Thus:

| Tolomako | Tsureviu | Proto-form | |
|---|---|---|---|
| tei | pei | *pei | "water" |
| nata | mata | *mata | "eye" |

When labials do occur preceding front vowels they seem to be reflexes of older labiovelars:

| Tolomako | Tsureviu | Proto-form | |
|---|---|---|---|
| pei | pei | *pʷei | "good" |
| mata | mata | *mʷata | "snake" |

Compare with Fijian ŋata "snake" (spelt gata).

It is possible that Tolomako is a very simplified daughter-language or pidgin of the neighboring language Sakao. However, Tolomako is more likely a sister language of Sakao, not a pidgin. It cannot be phonologically derived from Sakao, whereas Sakao can be from Tolomako to some extent (one innovation of Tolomako is the shift of /*ŋ/ to /ɣ/, whereas Sakao retains it). Comparing Tolomako with its close dialect of Tsureviu allows researchers to reconstruct an earlier state, from which most of Sakao can be regularly derived. This earlier state is very close to what can be reconstructed of Proto-North-Central Vanuatu. Thus Tolomako is a very conservative language, whereas Sakao has undergone drastic innovations in its phonology and grammar, both in the direction of increased complexity.

== Phonology ==
Tolomako vowels
| | front unrounded | back rounded |
|---|---|---|
| close | i | u |
| mid | e | o |
| open | a | |

Tolomako consonants
| | labial | alveolar | velar |
|---|---|---|---|
| nasal | m | n | |
| plosive | p | t | k |
| affricate | | ts | |
| fricative | β | | ɣ |
| trill | | r | |
| approximant | | l | |

Tolomako has a simple syllable structure, maximally consonant-vowel-vowel: V, CV, VV, CVV. However, in older materials, it permitted closed syllables, such as kanam "you (exclusive)" versus kanamu, though this may reflect the epenthetic addition of non-etymological u in closed syllables.

== Deixis ==
There are three degrees of deixis, here/this, there/that, yonder/yon.

== Nouns ==
Tolomako has inalienably possessed nouns, which are regularly derived:

tsiɣo- "mouth"
| Tolomako | English |
|---|---|
| na tsiɣo-ku | "my mouth" |
| na tsiɣo-mu | "thy mouth" |
| na tsiɣo-na | "his/her/its mouth" |
| na tsiɣo-... | "...'s mouth" |

βulu- "hair"
| Tolomako | English |
|---|---|
| na βulu-ku | "my hair" |
| na βulu-mu | "thy hair" |
| na βulu-na | "his/her/its hair" |
| na βulu-... | "...'s hair" |

== Syntax ==
Tolomako syntax is isolating. It has a single preposition, ne, for all relationships of space and time; below it is used to distinguish the object of a verb from the instrument used.

mo losi na poe ne na matsa
3SG hits ART pig PREP ART club
"He hits (kills) the pig with a club"

=== Literature ===
Tolomako was unwritten until the arrival of missionaries from the New Hebrides Mission. James Sandilands translated Matthew, Jonah and Malachi from the Bible into Tolomako and these were published as "Na taveti tahonae hi Iesu Kristo, Matiu moulia..." by the British and Foreign Bible Society in 1904. A missionary with the New Hebrides Mission, Charles E. Yates translated the book of Acts into Tolomaku and this was published by the Melbourne Auxiliary of the British and Foreign Bible Society in 1906.

Charles E. Yates then worked on the Gospel of John, the Letter to the Philippians and the 1st and 2nd Letters to Timothy. With the help of fifteen of his teaching staff they translated "Na Taveti Tahonai hi Jon na Varisula" and 750 copies were published by the British and Foreign Bible Society in 1909.

== See also ==
- Sakao language, for parallels to the above in a closely related but grammatically more complex language
