= Tutuba (island) =

- Island
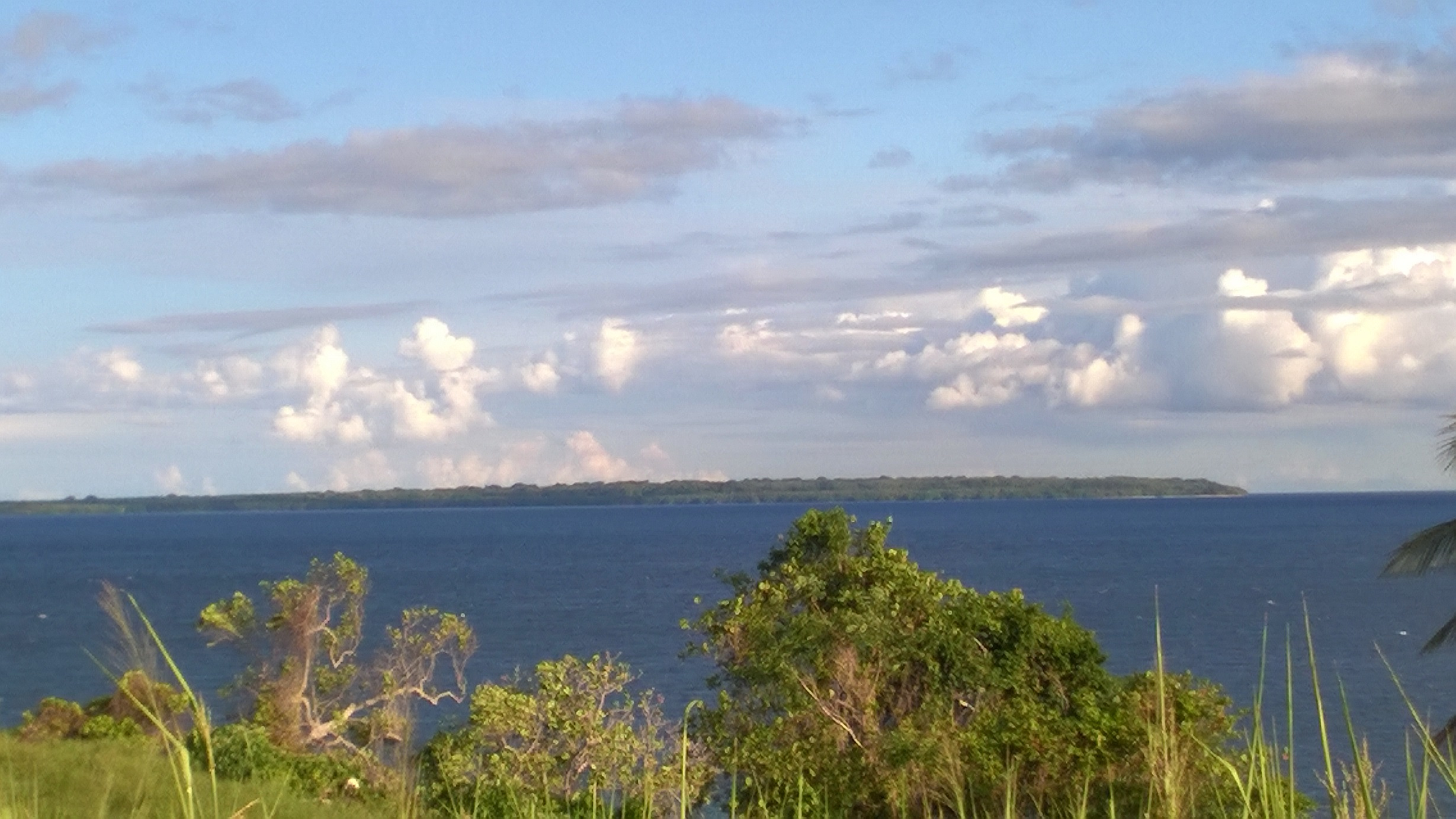
- View of Tutuba Island from Espiritu Santo

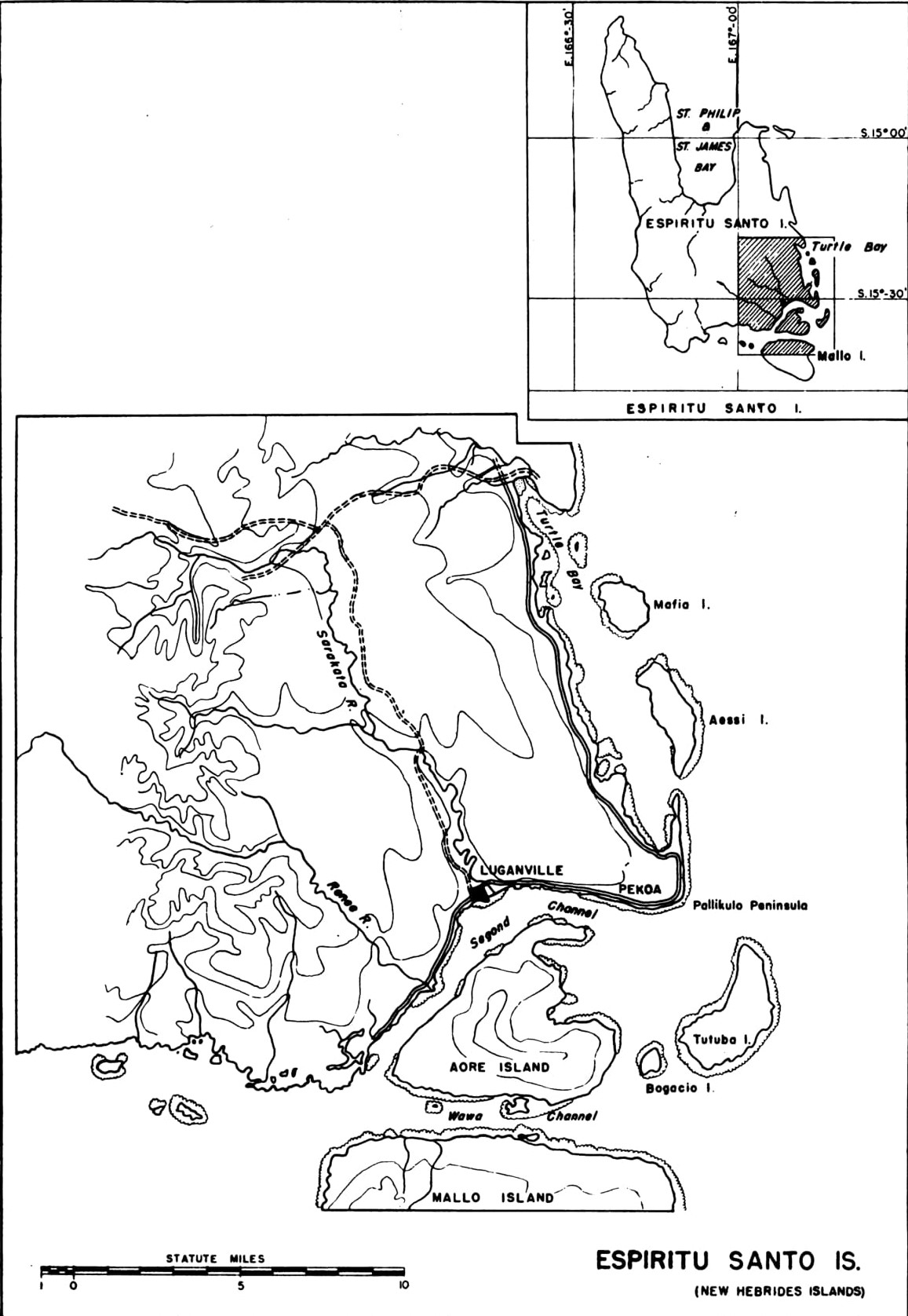
- The island is located on the bottom right of the map

- Location in Vanuatu
- Coordinates: 15.56°S 167.29°E
- Country: Vanuatu
- Province: Sanma Province

Area
  - Total: 13.82 km^{2} (5.34 sq mi)

Population (2009)
  - Total: 609
  - Density: 44.1/km^{2} (114/sq mi)
- Time zone: UTC+11 (VUT)

Tutuba is an island in Vanuatu, located off the coast of Vanuatu's largest island Espiritu Santo in Sanma Province.

== Population ==
The small local population of Tutuba of some 600 people live in villages along the north-western shore. The local inhabitants speak the Tutuba language.

== Geography ==
The island is quite small being 7.0 km long and just 2.5 km wide at the widest point. According to the Lonely Planet guide, "golden beaches line Tutuba's west coast."
