= Maewo =

Island in Vanuatu

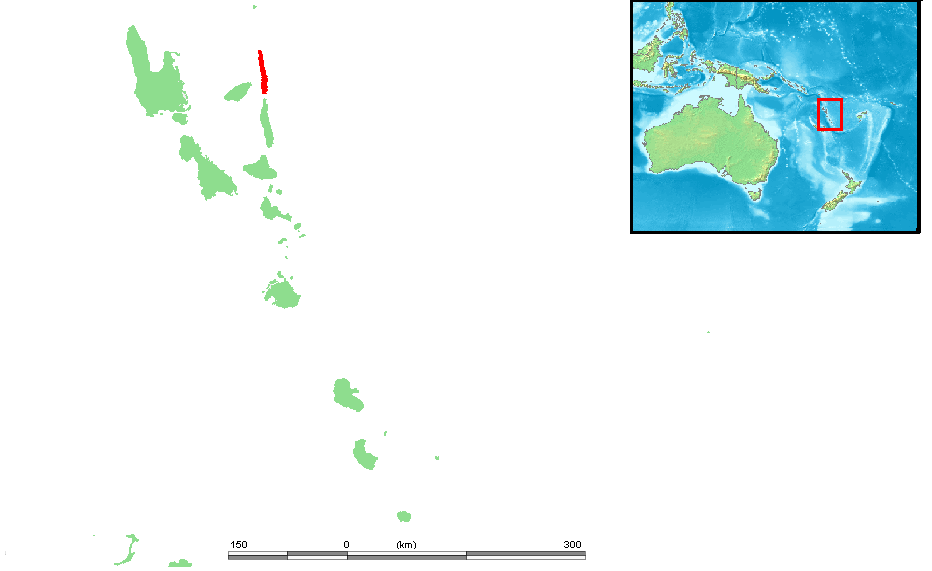
- Map of Maewo

Geography
- Location: Pacific Ocean
- Coordinates: 15°10′S 168°10′E
- Archipelago: New Hebrides
- Area: 269 km^{2} (104 sq mi)
- Highest elevation: 795 m (2608 ft)

Administration
- Vanuatu
- Province: Penama

Demographics
- Population: 3,569 (2009)
- Ethnic groups: Ni-Vanuatu

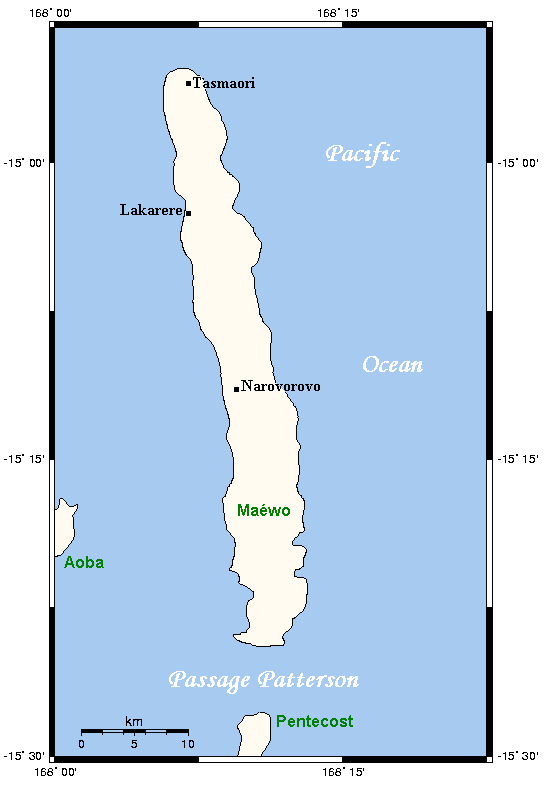
Maewo Island

Maewo (locally [ŋʷaewo], in English as /ˈmaɪwoʊ, ˈmeɪ-/ MY-woh, MAY- and formerly Aurora Island) is an island in Vanuatu in Penama province, 105 km to the east of Espiritu Santo.

It is 47 km long, and 6 km wide, with an area of 269 km^{2}. Its highest point is 795 m above sea level. In 2009 the island had a population of almost 3,600. Maewo is covered with dense vegetation: tropical forests in which banyan trees grow.

== Name ==
The name Maewo is thought to have come from Mota, Raga, or Ambae as an attempt to transcribe the pronunciation [ŋ͡mʷaewo]. In the local languages it is spelled as N̄waewo [ŋʷaewo]. Other names for the island include Mwerlap N̄wēw [ŋʷɪw] and Mwotlap Am̄ew [aŋ͡mʷɛw] (with the locative prefix a-). All of these terms are thought to have come from Proto-North-Central Vanuatu (and Proto-Torres–Banks) *mʷaewo.

== History ==
First recorded sighting of Maewo Island by Europeans was by the Spanish expedition of Pedro Fernández de Quirós at the end of April 1606. It was sighted again in 1768 by Louis Antoine de Bougainville who named it Aurora from the Latin word for "dawn", the time of day at which it was sighted.

== Geography ==
Maewo is the island with the highest rainfall in Vanuatu. The island is covered in green, lush vegetation. The heavy rainfall provides abundant fresh water and waterfalls. There are also hot springs in the centre of Maewo. The largest of these waterfalls is a series of cascades located near Maewo-Naone Airport on the north end of the island near the village of Naone. This series of cascades is commonly referred to as Big Wota (Big Water in Bislama).

The climate on Maevo is humid tropical. The average annual rainfall is about 3,500 mm of rain. There are two seasons in the year: the rainy season, which lasts from November to April, and the dry season, which lasts from May to October. The island is subject to frequent cyclones and earthquakes.
