= Dany Island =

Island in Vanuatu

- Interactive map of Dany Island

Geography
- Location: Pacific Ocean
- Coordinates: 15°21′28″S 167°12′31″E
- Archipelago: Vanuatu
- Area: approximately 36.500 to 37.000 m^{2} (~400.000 sq ft)

Administration
- Vanuatu
- Province: Sanma Province

Demographics
- Population: 0 (2015)
- Ethnic groups: None

Dany Island is a privately owned tropical island located in the Sanma Province of Vanuatu, in the Pacific Ocean. The island has been developed into a tourist resort.

== Geography ==
Located about 1.5 km from Espiritu Santo, Dany Island is part of a cluster that includes several small islands and islets, namely Araki, Elephant Island, Sakao, Lataroa, Lataro, Thion, Malohu, Malwepe, Malvapevu, Malparavu, Maltinerava, Oyster Island, Tangoa, and Bokissa.

== Ecology ==
Dany Island has an ecosystem of tropical fish within its coral reefs. The island is a nesting site for giant sea turtles. It hosts a diverse terrestrial ecosystem, including butterflies and hermit crabs.

== As a resort ==
Dany Island opened in 2025. The "eco-resort" was opened by Australian philanthropist Dany Girgis as a low-footprint resort.
