= Narave pig =

Type of pig in Vanuatu

Narave
- Conservation status: Endangered
- Country of origin: Vanuatu
- Distribution: Malo Island, Espiritu Santo, Gaua, and nearby islands
- Use: Religious

Traits

The Narave or Naravé pig is a type of domestic pig native to northern Vanuatu. Narave pigs are pseudohermaphrodite (intersex) male individuals that are kept for ceremonial purposes.

== Etymology ==
The term narave is from Bislama, with the common Oceanic article na-.

Clark (2009) reconstructs Proto-North-Central Vanuatu *raβʷe ‘hermaphrodite pig, intersex pig’. Reflexes documented in Clark (2009) include Mota rawe ‘an hermaphrodite pig, female’; Raga ravwe ‘hermaphrodite (usually of pig)’; Nokuku rawe ‘boar’ (MacDonald 1889), rav ‘intersex pig’ (Clark 2005–2007 field notes); Vara Kiai rave; Tamambo ravue; Sakao e-re ‘intersex pig’; Suñwadaga na-raghwe; Araki dave; Vao na-rav ‘intersex pigs’, bò-rav ‘sow’. François (2021) documents Araki rave [ɾaβe] ‘hermaphrodite pig, of great customary value’.

== Endocrinology ==
In the pigs, deficiency of the mitochondrial cytochrome P450 enzyme 17α-hydroxylase (CYP17A1) causes very low 17α-Hydroxypregnenolone levels, leading to pseudohermaphroditism.

== Genetics ==
An analysis of Narave pig mitochondrial DNA by Lum et al. (2006) found that they are descended from Southeast Asian pigs and were brought to the island by Lapita seafarers about 3,000 years ago.

== Distribution ==
Although formerly widespread across northern Vanuatu, intersex pigs are most common in Malo Island during the 21st century. Intersex pigs are kept for use in Nimangki grade-taking ceremonies at Patani village on the northwestern coast of Espiritu Santo. Some intersex pigs are kept on Gaua and northeastern Ambae islands, although they are not as prevalent compared to the early 20th century. Old carvings of intersex pigs on Vao Island can also still be found. An intersex pig was also found on Aore Island by McIntyre (1997).

John R. Baker (1928) reported large numbers of intersex pigs in Espiritu Santo, where he reported to have seen "no fewer than 125 intersexes in one single day at Hog Harbour" during an event when younger and older pigs were brought together from different islands for trading. He also received reports that such pigs were present on the islands of Gaua, Vanua Lava, Mota, Ambae, Ambrym (not in large numbers), and Tongoa. He reports that intersex-producing females were also brought from the other islands to breed intersex pigs on Merelava and Merig islands. Baker's dissections showed that all the animals he looked at had only male internal sexual organs. That is, despite the appearance of their external genitalia, internally there was no question that they were male pigs.

Baker (1928) reported the following names for intersex pigs in various parts of Vanuatu.

- rauoē in Mota
- rau or rolas in Gaua
- ndrē or nerē in the northeast peninsula of Espiritu Santo
- ra or ravē in southeast Espiritu Santo
- teret in Ambrym
- pulpul in Tongoa

In the 21st century, Narave pigs can be found in Avunatari village, Malo Island. There is also another population in Nasulnun village, Espiritu Santo Island, whose residents have recently relocated there from Malo Island, which has an exclusively Tamambo-speaking native population.
