= Otostigmus greggi =

Scientific classification
- Kingdom: Animalia
- Phylum: Arthropoda
- Subphylum: Myriapoda
- Class: Chilopoda
- Order: Scolopendromorpha
- Family: Scolopendridae
- Genus: Otostigmus
- Species: O. greggi

Binomial name
- Otostigmus greggi (Chamberlin, 1944)

Species of centipede

Otostigmus greggi is a species of centipede in the Scolopendridae family. It was described in 1944 by American myriapodologist Ralph Vary Chamberlin.

== Distribution ==
The species occurs in Vanuatu. The type locality is Hog Harbour on the island of Espiritu Santo.
