= Champagne Beach =

Champagne Beach may refer to:

- Champagne Beach (Vanuatu)
- Champagne Beach (Dominica)
- Champagne Beach (Fiji), in the Yasawa Islands
