= Pseudohermaphroditism =

- Other names: Pseudo-hermaphroditism
- Specialty: Gynecology, endocrinology

Pseudohermaphroditism is a term for when an individual's gonads were mismatched with their internal reproductive system and/or external genitalia. The term was contrasted with "true hermaphroditism" (now known as ovotesticular syndrome), a condition describing an individual with both female and male reproductive gonadal tissues. Associated conditions include Persistent Müllerian duct syndrome and forms of androgen insensitivity syndrome.

== Mechanism ==
Sexual development is determined by chromosomes during fertilization. In the early stages of human development, a human embryo has the precursors of female (paramesonephric or Müllerian ducts) and male (mesonephric ducts or Wolffian) gonads. If a Y chromosome is lacking, or defective as seen in Swyer syndrome, the embryo will reabsorb the mesonephric ducts and proceed with paramesonephric ducts, which give rise to ovaries. The Y chromosome contains a sex-determining region called the SRY gene. Thus, the developmental plan of the embryo is altered only if this gene is present and functional.

Mutations affecting the androgen receptor (AR) gene may cause either complete or partial androgen insensitivity syndrome. Androgens are a group of hormones which regulate the development and maintenance of male characteristics. Between 8 and 12 weeks, human male fetuses become externally distinct as androgens enlarge the phallus and produce a penis with a urethra and scrotum.

Female pseudohermaphroditism refers to an individual with ovaries and external genitalia resembling those of a male. Male pseudohermaphroditism refers to an individual with testicles and external genitalia resembling those of a female. In some cases, external sex organs associated with pseudohermaphroditism appear intermediate between a typical clitoris and penis. Thus, pseudohermaphroditism is sometimes not identified until puberty or adulthood.

Persistent Müllerian duct syndrome was considered a form of pseudohermaphroditism, developed through Müllerian-inhibiting factor defects. In such instances, duct derivatives are present in males, including the uterus, fallopian tubes, and upper vagina.

== Management ==
Surgery is sometimes performed to alter the appearance of the genitals. Sex-specific cancers present on the gonads may require surgical removal.

== History ==
John Money is perhaps the best-known early researcher in this area. His doctoral thesis was titled Hermaphroditism: An Inquiry into the Nature of a Human Paradox, and awarded by Harvard University in 1952.

== Other animals ==
Narave pigs, which are native to Malo Island, Vanuatu, are pseudohermaphrodite male domestic pigs that are kept for ceremonial purposes.

== Terminology ==
The term "Pseudohermaphroditimus" (pseudohermaphroditism) was coined in German by Edwin Klebs in 1876. Klebs had included the term as a synonym for the earlier coined, "spurious hermaphroditism" (which he referred to as Schein-Zwitter in German). "Spurious hermaphroditism" was coined in 1836 by J. Y. Simpson.

Although "pseudohermaphroditism" persisted in the International Classification of Diseases, Versions 9 (ICD-9) and 10 (ICD-10) as 752.7 (Indeterminate sex and pseudohermaphroditism) and Q56 (Interdeterminate sex and pseudohermaphroditism), it has since been removed in the eleventh version (ICD-11), in favor of LD2A.Y (Other specified malformative disorders of sex development).

Some experts have indicated that both pseudohermaphroditism (also called false hermaphroditism) and true hermaphroditism are outdated, confusing, and potentially pejorative terms, indicating replacement with "disorders of sex development", "disorders of sexual development", "differences of sex development" (all abbreviated as DSD) or "intersex".

Additionally, intersex activists have noted that: "The qualifiers 'pseudo' and 'true' are even more harmful [than hermaphrodite on its own], because they imply a sort of authenticity, or lack of same, that carry powerful emotional baggage". Dreger et al had also noted that "division of many intersex types into true hermaphroditism, male pseudohermaphroditism, and female pseudohermaphroditism is scientifically specious and clinically problematic".

== See also ==
- (DoDI) 6130.03, 2018, section 5, 13f and 14m
- Disorders of sex development
- Intersex medical interventions
- Diophantus of Abae
- Callon of Epidaurus
- Complete Androgen Insensitivity Syndrome
- Narave pig
