= Elephant Island (disambiguation) =

Elephant Island may refer to:

- Elephant Island in the South Shetland Islands
- Elephant Island (Vanuatu)
- Elephant Jason Island in the Falkland Islands
- Elephanta Island in Mumbai Harbor
- Elephantine, an island in the Nile River
