= Aese =

Island of Vanuatu

Aese Island
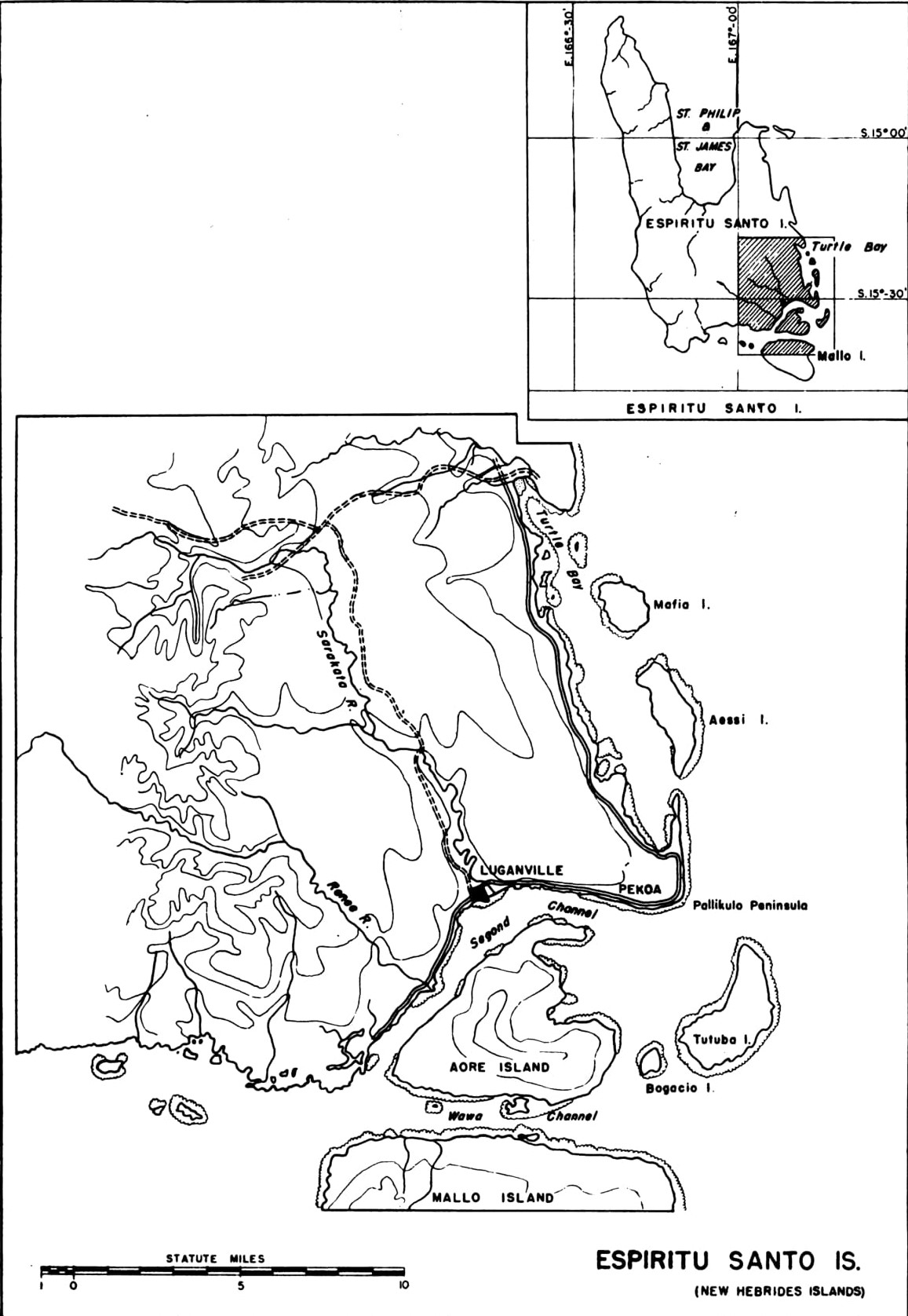

Geography
- Location: Pacific Ocean
- Coordinates: 15°26′1.68″S 167°15′0″E
- Archipelago: Vanuatu
- Area: 8.1 km^{2} (3.1 sq mi)
- Highest elevation: 38 m (125 ft)

Administration
- Vanuatu
- Province: Sanma Province

Demographics
- Population: 0 (2015)
- Ethnic groups: None

Aese Island (also known as Aessi, Haiite Island) is a private uninhabited island in Sanma Province of Vanuatu in the Pacific Ocean.

== Geography ==
Aese Island is located off the east coast of Espiritu Santo Island. The island has an area of 8.1 square kilometres (3.1 square miles), or 1690 acres (684 hectares) spanning 5.9 kilometres (3.7 miles) from the north to the south and 3 kilometres (1.9 miles) from the east to the west. Aese is very flat; the highest point of the island is 38 metres (125 feet) above sea level. The Perimeter of the Island is 18km.

== Habitat ==
Highly dense trees cover the island. Beaches are 5 metres wide. Hundreds of coconut trees from bygone days provide the archetypal tropical backdrop. The west side of the island faces into the sheltered waters of the bay and there are hundreds of metres of sandy beaches and shallow coral. The East side of the island has ocean views and a coral reef.

== Fish ==
Fish are common in the region and there are seasonal rotation of mahi-mahi, yellowfin tuna, dogtooth tuna, wahoo and marlin.

== Other ==
In the past, the island was densely populated, and about 700 people lived there in 1906.
