= PISRT1 =

Non-coding RNA in the species Homo sapiens

Identifiers
- Aliases: PISRT1, NCRNA00195, polled intersex syndrome regulated transcript 1 (non-protein coding RNA), PISRT1 lncRNA
- External IDs: GeneCards: PISRT1

Gene location (Human)
| Chr. | Chromosome 3 (human) |
| Band | 3q23 | Start | 139,232,992 bp |
| Band | 3q23 | End | 139,233,522 bp |
RNA expression pattern
| Bgee | Human / Mouse (ortholog); Top expressed in: testicle; adrenal gland; gonad; sural nerve; ovary; monocyte; tibial arteries; blood; mucosa of esophagus; spleen / n/a; More reference expression data |
| BioGPS | n/a |
Orthologs
| Databases | NCBI: entry; OMA: entry |
| Species | Human | Mouse |
| Entrez | 140464 | n/a |
| Ensembl | ENSG00000281473 | n/a |
| UniProt | n a | n/a |
| RefSeq (mRNA) | n/a | n/a |
| RefSeq (protein) | n/a | n/a |
| Location (UCSC) | Chr 3: 139.23 – 139.23 Mb | n/a |
| PubMed search | | n/a |
- Wikidata
| View/Edit Human |

PISRT1 (polled intersex syndrome regulated transcript 1) is a long non-coding RNA. It was originally thought to be implicated in the polled intersex (PIS) mutation in goats, but this has been shown to not be the case. It has also been shown not to be involved in sex determination in the rodent Ellobius lutescens and in dogs, and is unlikely to be involved in sex-specific gonad differentiation in mice.

Polled Intersex Syndrome (PIS) is a disorder of sexual development seen in goats. The disorder shows an association with the polled phenotype and intersexuality. XX goats present with testes and are SRY negative. Studies have shown that PIS is caused by a deletion of a 10.1-kb DNA element which regulates the transcription of both PISRT1 and FOXL2, with the latter having been shown to be responsible for sex-determination in goats.

== See also ==
- Long noncoding RNA
