= Mavea =

Mavea may refer to:

- Mav̋ea language
- Mavea, an island in Vanuatu
