= Urelapa =

Uninhabited island in Sanma Province, Vanuatu

- Interactive map of Urelapa

Geography
- Location: Pacific Ocean
- Coordinates: 13°37′0″S 167°1′0″E
- Archipelago: Vanuatu

Administration
- Vanuatu
- Province: Sanma Province

Demographics
- Population: 0 (2015)
- Ethnic groups: None

Urelapa Island (also Île Oulilapa, Île Ulilapa) is a private uninhabited island in Sanma Province of Vanuatu in the Pacific Ocean.
