= Intersex (biology) =

Sex characteristics between male and female

Intersex is a general term for an organism that has sex characteristics that are between male and female. It typically applies to a minority of members of gonochoric animal species such as mammals (as opposed to hermaphroditic species in which the majority of members can have both male and female sex characteristics). Such organisms are usually sterile.

Intersexuality can occur due to both genetic and environmental factors and has been reported in mammals, fish, nematodes, crustaceans, and birds.

== Mammals ==
It is estimated that 0.1% to 1.4% of pigs are intersex. In Vanuatu, Narave pigs are sacred intersex pigs that are found on Malo Island. An analysis of Narave pig mitochondrial DNA by Lum et al. (2006) found that they are descended from Southeast Asian pigs.

Female spotted hyenas have a pseudo-penis which led to a myth that they are hermaphroditic.

In cattle, a freemartin is the infertile female twin of a bull. Freemartins have both XX and XY chromosomes, non-functional ovaries, and exhibit masculine behavior, due to anti-Müllerian hormone affecting sexual development.

At least six different mole species have an adaption where the female mole has an ovotestis, "a hybrid organ made up of both ovarian and testicular tissue. The evolved purpose of this adoption is to give them an extra dose of testosterone to make them just as muscular and aggressive as male moles". Only the ovarian part of the ovotestis is reproductively functional.

Intersexuality in humans is relatively rare. Depending on the definition, the prevalence of intersex among humans has been reported to range around a figure of 0.018%.

== Nematodes ==
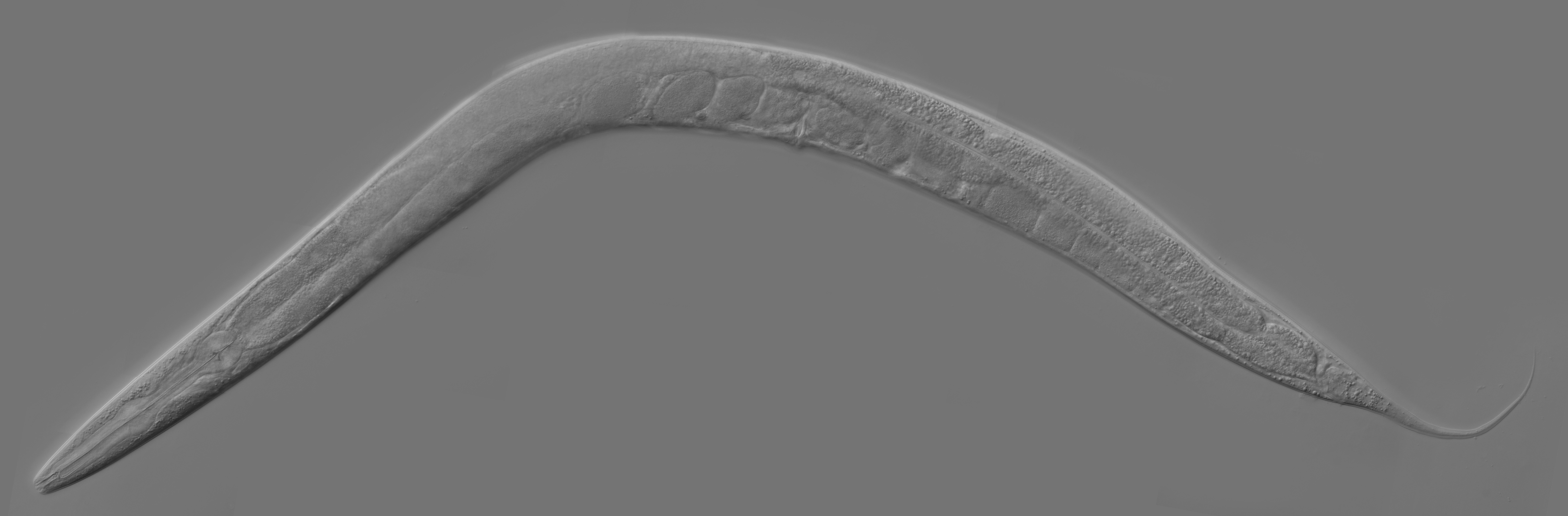
Adult Caenorhabditis elegans

Intersex is known to occur in all main groups of nematodes. Most of them are functionally female. Male intersexes with female characteristics have been reported but are less common.

== Fishes ==
Gonadal intersex occurs in fishes, where the individual has both ovarian and testicular tissue. Although it is a rare anomaly among gonochoric fishes, it is a transitional state in fishes that are protandric or protogynous. Intersexuality has been reported in 23 fish families.

== Crustaceans ==
The oldest evidence for intersexuality in crustaceans comes from fossils dating back 70 million years ago. Intersex has been reported in gonochoric crustaceans as early as 1729. A large amount of literature exists on intersexuality for isopoda and amphipoda, with there being reports of both intersex males and intersex females.

== See also ==
- Gynandromorphism
- Hermaphrodite
- Sexual differentiation
