= Malwepe =

Island in Vanuatu

- Interactive map of Malwepe

Geography
- Location: Pacific Ocean
- Coordinates: 15°22′50″S 167°11′05″E
- Archipelago: Vanuatu
- Highest elevation: 16 m (52 ft)

Administration
- Vanuatu
- Province: Sanma Province

Demographics
- Population: 0 (2015)
- Ethnic groups: None

Malwepe (also Lepérousel Island) is a small uninhabited island in Sanma Province of Vanuatu in the Pacific Ocean.

== Geography ==
Malwepe lies off the eastern coast of Espiritu Santo, which is the largest island in the nation of Vanuatu.
