= Araki language =

Austronesian language spoken in Vanuatu

Araki
- sorosoro-ni Raki
- Pronunciation: [ˈɾaki]
- Native to: Vanuatu
- Region: Araki Island, Espiritu Santo
- Native speakers: 8 (2012)
- Language family: Austronesian: Malayo-Polynesian; Oceanic; Southern Oceanic; North-Central Vanuatu; North Vanuatu; Espiritu Santo; Araki

Language codes
- ISO 639-3: akr
- Glottolog: arak1252
- ELP: Araki
- Araki is classified as Critically Endangered by the UNESCO Atlas of the World's Languages in Danger.

Araki (autonym sorosoro-ni Raki) is a nearly extinct language spoken in the small island of Araki, south of Espiritu Santo Island in Vanuatu. Araki is gradually being replaced by Tangoa, a language from a neighbouring island.

== Name ==
The name Araki [aˈraki] comes from the Tamambo language (with the locative marker a-). Its native name is Raki [ˈɾaki].

== Classification ==
Araki belongs to the Oceanic branch of the Austronesian languages, more specifically the Espiritu Santo group.

== Current situation ==
Araki was estimated to have 8 native speakers in 2012 with ongoing language shift towards the neighboring language Tangoa. The rest of the island's population have a passive knowledge of Araki, meaning they understand it but have limited ability to speak it. A large portion of the Araki vocabulary, as well as idiosyncratic syntactic and phonetic phenomena of the language have been lost. The pidgin Bislama is also spoken by many speakers of Araki as the country's lingua franca (although it is rarely used in rural areas).

Araki was described in 2002 by the linguist Alexandre François.

| Year | Pop | Spkr | Source |
|---|---|---|---|
| 1897 | 103 | 103 | Miller (1990) |
| 1972 | | 72 | Tryon (1972) |
| 1989 | 112 | 80 | Tryon and Charpentier (1989) |
| 1996 | 105 | 105 (Note: Vari-Bogiri (2008) suggests this is an overestimate, suggesting an alternate estimate of 45 speakers) | Grimes (1996) |
| 1998 | 121 | 34 | Vari-Bogiri (2008) |

== Phonology ==
Araki has a phonological inventory of 16 consonant phonemes and 5 vowels.

=== Consonants ===
Araki has 16 consonants. They generally appear at the beginning of a syllable, with some exceptions.

Araki Consonants
| | Bilabial | Linguolabial | Alveolar | Velar | Glottal |
|---|---|---|---|---|---|
| Nasal | m ⟨m⟩ | n̼ ⟨m̈⟩ | n ⟨n⟩ | ŋ ⟨ng⟩ | |
| Plosive | p ⟨p⟩ | t̼ ⟨p̈⟩ | t ⟨t⟩ | k ⟨k⟩ | |
| Affricate | | | t͡ʃ ⟨j⟩ | | |
| Fricative | β ⟨v⟩ | ð̼ ⟨v̈⟩ | s ⟨s⟩ | | h ⟨h⟩ |
| Flap | | | ɾ ⟨r⟩ | | |
| Trill | | | r ⟨r̄⟩ | | |
| Lateral | | | l ⟨l⟩ | | |

Only fluent speakers of Araki distinguish between the flap [ɾ] and the trill [r]; and only they can distinguish and pronounce the linguolabial consonants. Passive users of the language replace these consonants either with bilabial consonants or alveolar consonants.

Araki is one of the few languages of Vanuatu, and indeed of the world, that has a set of linguolabial consonants. It also lacks voiced stops, as well as prenasalised stops, both of which are prevalent in the Oceanic language group. Additionally, Araki has an unusually high number of alveolar consonants (particularly notable is the existence of a contrast between the alveolar trill and the alveolar flap).

=== Vowels ===
Araki has 5 vowel phonemes:

Vowels
| | Front | Back |
|---|---|---|
| High | i | u |
| Mid | e | o |
| Low | a | |

Araki does not have phonemic long vowels or diphthongs. However, strings of consecutive vowels are possible, indeed prevalent, in the language. In these cases, each vowel belongs to a separate syllable.

Historically, this system is conservative of the Proto-Oceanic vowel system as it can be reconstructed.

=== Syllable structure and stress ===
Most syllables in Araki are open (CV). Diachronic effects of word stress have led to the irregular loss of some syllables, and the creation of the new phonotactic patterns of CVC and CCV, with many word-final consonants, though not as pervasive compared to the Torres–Banks languages. Although a cluster of more than two consonants is impossible within a word, longer consonant clusters may appear in longer linguistic sequences.

Word stress in Araki normally falls on the penultimate syllable, at least when the last syllable of the word is of the form (C)V. A secondary stress may be heard on every second syllable toward the left of the word. Stress is assigned only after the lexeme has received all its affixes to form the whole phonological word. A process of final high vowel deletion (which is common in Vanuatu languages) does not affect the stress rule.

=== Writing system ===
After François (2002) proposed an initial system for the orthography, he later amended it in agreement with the community. The new orthography is indicated here:

Araki alphabet
| Letter | a | e | h | i | j | k | l | m | m̈ | n | ng | o | p | p̈ | r | r̄ | s | t | u | v | v̈ |
| Pronunciation | a | e | h | i | t͡ʃ | k | l | m | n̼ | n | ŋ | o | p | t̼ | ɾ | r | s | t | u | β | ð̼ |

The older orthography used ⟨c⟩ for t͡ʃ, ⟨d⟩ for ɾ, ⟨r⟩ for r, and ⟨g⟩ for ŋ.

== Grammar ==
Araki syntax can be divided into an open set of lexemes, including nouns, adjectives, verbs, adjuncts, adverbs, numerals and demonstratives, and a closed set of morphemes, which are often monosyllabic clitics or affixes.

=== Word order ===
The sentence order in Araki is strictly subject–verb–object (SVO). There is a clear formal boundary between the direct object (always internal to the predicate phrase, whether incorporated or not) and the oblique arguments: adverbs, prepositional phrases and indirect objects (which always appear outside the verb phrase).

=== Nouns ===
As in many Oceanic languages, not only verbs but also nouns (as well as other syntactic categories) are predicative in Araki. Nouns differ from verbs in being directly predicative, which means that they do not have to be preceded by a subject clitic. Also, only nouns are able to refer directly to entities of the world, and make them arguments entering into larger sentence structures.

Syntactically speaking, a noun can be either the subject of a sentence, the object of a transitive verb or the object of a preposition, all syntactic slots which are forbidden to verbs or adjectives. Proper names, both place names and personal names, can be said to belong to the global category of nouns in Araki.

==== Noun-phrase structure ====
Contrary to many languages of Vanuatu, Araki did not retain the noun article *na of Proto Oceanic, nor any other obligatory noun determiner. As a consequence, a noun root on its own can form a valid NP in a sentence.

A noun phrase must have a head: this can be a noun, an independent pronoun or certain demonstratives. an adjective cannot be a NP-head, but needs the support of the empty head mara. All other elements are optional. A maximal NP should follow the following order of constituents, most of which are optional:

1. an article: plural rai, partitive r̄e, definite va
2. a noun or the empty head mara, or a 'possessive bundle', formed by {possessed noun + (a possessive classifier +) a possessor}
3. an adjective
4. the anaphoric marker ri
5. a demonstrative word
6. a numeral preceded by a subject clitic (usually mo), similar to a clause
7. a relative clause
8. a prepositional phrase

It is rare to meet more than three or four elements in one NP.

==== Articles and reference-tracking devices ====
Semantically speaking, a noun without an article can be specific as well as non-specific, and definite as well as indefinite. Moreover, not only is there no gender-distinction, but even number is most of the time under-specified; only the context, and partly the personal marker on the verb, help distinguish between singular and plural reference.

Several devices are available, though always optional, in Araki to help track the reference of a particular NP. These are the clitics va, ri, mara, rai, r̄e, mo hese, which appear as shown in the above list.

The pro-clitic va and the post-clitic ri both mark anaphoric relations. va is placed immediately before the noun, and codes for discourse-internal anaphora (that is, reference to a term that has already been introduced in the earlier context). ri immediately follows the noun, and seems to refer to the immediate context preceding it (comparable with the English anaphoric use of 'this').

The construction {va N ri} does not exist. This indicates that the two clitics must have different uses.

The empty head mara can be found at the beginnings of NPs. It never occurs alone, but is always followed by an adjective or a place name. Its role is to refer to a set of human individuals defined by the next word, in a similar way to English 'one' in the small one(s). mara can be described as a personal nominalizer. It does not involve definiteness or number.

The plural marker rai makes explicit the plurality of the NP, which is otherwise never coded for, and often left implicit. As all other markers mentioned in this section, it too is optional.

The specific indefinite mo hese, a numeral quantifier meaning 'one', is very commonly, if not obligatorily, used when a referent is introduced for the first time into the discourse. mo hese may be used as a numerical predicate, contrasting with other numbers, but it is most frequently used as a kind of article following the NP in order to mark it as being indefinite, that is, newly introduced into the discourse.

The partitive–indefinite pro-clitic r̄e is used when the NP refers to a new, non-specific instance of a notion. In order to understand this concept, compare the English sentences 'I ate a banana ' with 'I want to eat a banana '. Besides being indefinite in both cases, in the first sentence a banana is specific, because it refers to a specific banana; in the second sentence a banana is non-specific, because it can refer to any banana, not one in particular. Although this semantic difference is not grammaticalized in English, it is in Araki, using re as a marker for non-specific indefinite reference.

The function of the aforementioned reference-tracking devices can be summarized as follows:

| | Definite | Indefinite |
|---|---|---|
| Specific | N // va N // N ri 'The cake is ready' | N // N mo hese 'I ate a cake' |
| Non-specific | N 'I like cake' | N // r̄e N 'I want to eat a cake' |

=== Verbs ===
Verbs are predicative words, which are preceded by subject clitics. Unlike nouns, they cannot form a direct predicate (that is, without a clitic), and cannot refer to an entity, nor form the subject of a sentence. They cannot directly modify a noun by just following it. From the semantic point of view, verbs refer to actions, events or states. Each verb in Araki must be marked with either realis or irrealis mood.

The only obligatory elements of a verb phrase are the head and the subject clitic. This can be extended not only to phrases headed by a verb, but also to phrases headed by an adjective or a numeral. Under certain conditions, a noun can also be the head of a so-called 'VP', provided that it is endowed with mood-aspectual properties, such as negation.

From a syntactic point of view, Araki contrasts intransitive with transitive verbs.

==== Intransitive verbs ====
Intransitive verbs never take either object NPs or transitive suffixes.

They are morphologically unvarying (that is, receive no morphological markings).

==== Transitive verbs ====
Transitive verbs take object arguments, as NPs and/or as object suffixes. Most transitive (or transitivised) verbs, though not all of them, can be morphologically marked as such. This usually implies the presence of a transitivity suffix -i and/or of an object personal suffix.

Some verbs can be described as having oblique transitivity, since they are usually followed by an oblique (generally, prepositional) complement.

Araki does not normally allow for ditransitive verbs. Where English would have two direct objects, as in I'll give you some money, Araki would have one complement as a direct object, while the other would be assigned the oblique case. Therefore, one complement appears inside the VP and the other outside it.

==== Symmetrical verbs ====
Some verbs in Araki allow its syntactic subject to be marked with either the case role of patient or agent.

M̈ar̄asala mo ere.
door 3:R open
'The door opened/is open.'

Nam ere m̈ar̄asala.
1sg:R open door
'I opened the door.'

However, this phenomenon is more limited in Araki than it is in English.

==== Verb serialization ====
Araki allows two verb roots to appear in one single verb phrase, thus forming a sort of complex verb {V_{1}, V_{2}}; usually no more than two verbs can appear at a time. This series of two verbs share one mood-subject clitic and the same aspect markers. This does not imply that they semantically have the same subject. No object or other complement can insert between these two verbs. The transitivity suffix -i, as well as the object suffix, appear on the right of the second verb, provided this is authorized by the morphology of V_{2} and by the syntactic context.

Verb serialization is much rarer in Araki than in many other Oceanic languages. It seems to be productive only when either of the two verbs is a movement verb. Another less seldom pattern is when the second element is a stative verb or an adjective: V_{2} indicates the manner of V_{1}.

A much more frequent strategy in Araki is that of clause chaining.

=== Personal markers ===
In the case of Araki, it is more appropriate to discuss ‘personal markers’ (rather than ‘pronouns’). There are seven morphosyntactic person markings: first, second, third, and in the case of non-singular first person, there is an inclusive/exclusive distinction.

==== Independent pronouns ====
| | | Singular | Plural |
|---|---|---|---|
| 1st person | inclusive | na | nija |
| 1st person | exclusive | na | kam̈am |
| 2nd person | | n(i)ko | kam̈im |
| 3rd person | | nia | n(i)da |

==== Subject clitics and person markers ====
The following table shows the clitics that provide ordinary marking of subjects in verbal sentences. They express two moods, realis and irrealis.

Subject clitics and personal markers
| | | Realis | | Irrealis | |
| | | singular | plural | singular | plural |
|---|---|---|---|---|---|
| 1st person | inclusive | | jam | | jo |
| 1st person | exclusive | nam | kam | na | kam̈a |
| 2nd person | | om | ham | o | ha |
| 3rd person | | mo | | co | ha |

Whether the mood is coded as realis or irrealis depends on the modality of the verb phrase.

=== Numerals ===
Numerals behave syntactically like (intransitive) verbs, and could be argued to form a subset of verbal lexemes. They must always be introduced by a subject clitic, which is sensitive to person and modality (realis/irrealis).

Nar̄u-ku mo rua.
child-1sg 3:R two
'I have two children.' (lit. my child is/are two)

==== Cardinal numbers ====
Numerals are listed in the following table:

| Araki | English |
|---|---|
| mo hese | one |
| mo rua | two |
| mo r̄olu | three |
| mo v̈ar̄i | four |
| mo lim̈a | five |
| mo haion(o) | six |
| mo haip̈ir̄u | seven |
| mo haualu | eight |
| mo haisua | nine |
| mo sangavul(u) | ten |
| mo sangavul jomana mo hese | eleven |
| mo sangavul jomana mo dua | twelve |
| mo ngavul rua | twenty |
| mo ngavul rua mo hese | twenty one |
| mo ngavul r̄olu | thirty |
| mo ngavul haip̈ir̄u | seventy |
| mo ngavul sangavulu | one hundred |
| mo ngavul sangavulu mo sangavulu | one hundred and ten |
| mo ngavul sangavulu rua | two hundred |
| mo ngavul sangavulu sangavulu | one thousand |

==== Ordinal numbers ====
Ordinal numbers are formed with the prefix ha-, at least for the numbers 2–5. Greater numbers have already integrated this (or a similar) prefix ha- to their radical.

The number 'one' has a suppletive form mudu 'first'.

The ordinal forms are used especially with the word dan(i) to form the days of the weeks:

| Araki | English |
|---|---|
| ran muru | Monday |
| ha-rua ran | Tuesday |
| ha-r̄olu ran | Wednesday |
| ha-v̈ar̄i ran | Thursday |
| ha-lim̈a ran | Friday |
| haiono ran | Saturday |
| haip̈ir̄u ran | Sunday |

=== Adjectives ===
Contrary to many languages which lack a distinct category of adjectives, Araki does have a set of lexemes which can be named this way. The lexical category of adjectives is defined by two basic principles:

- adjectives can be predicates, and in this case must be preceded by a subject clitic, like numerals or verbs;
- adjectives can modify directly a noun in a noun phrase, without a subject clitic (opp. numerals) or a relative structure (opp. verbs).

Adjectives always follow the noun they modify, and come before numerals.

p̈ir̄a hetehehete mo hese
woman small 3:R one
'a young woman'

=== Adjuncts ===
Adjuncts form quite a small category of lexical items whose syntactic position is to follow immediately the verb radical, though still within the verb phrase. When the verb is transitive, adjuncts are inserted between the verb radical and the transitiviser suffix and/or the object suffixes, as though they were incorporated:

Na pa nak taha m̈ar̄e-ko!
1sg SEQ hit RES dead-OBJ:2sg
'I'm going to kill you!' (lit. hit-become-dead you)

=== Adverbs ===
Contrary to adjuncts, which are always incorporated into the verb phrase, adverbs never are. They can appear either at the beginning or at the end of a clause. The unmarked position of a (non-typical) adverb is after the verb–object bundle, where prepositional phrases are too. The category of adverbs includes all words which form directly (that is, without a preposition) an oblique complement.

V̈apa ri mo r̄oho r̄o saha-ni kaur̄a.
cave ANA 3:R stay IPFV up-there above
'The cave is located up there, above'.

=== Demonstratives ===
Demonstratives are associated either to nouns for reference tracking, or have the whole clause as their scope. Although they syntactically behave partially like locational adverbs, demonstrative words form a specific paradigm, which is easily identified morphologically.

=== Reduplication ===
Araki uses reduplication in order to present a notion as intense, multiple or plural in one way or another. Semantically, verbal reduplication triggers features such as non-referentiality/genericity of the object, and thus is generally associated with noun incorporation. Reduplication is also the main device, if not the only one, which allows a word to change its syntactic category. Reduplication occurs:

- From noun to noun (indicating plurality, and sometimes a diminutive capacity ('Many Ns, 'small Ns').
  e.g. nar̄u 'son' → nanar̄u 'sons', hurar̄a 'dirt' → hurahurar̄a 'small particles of dirt'
- From noun to verb or adjective (referring not to an of the world, but to a process/state which is normally caused by it).
  e.g. alo 'sun' → aloalo 'to be sunny'
- From verb to verb (deriving one of the following: an intensified meaning, plurality, reflexivity, distributivity, imperfectivity, detransitivity).
  e.g. v̈ano 'walk' → v̈anov̈ano 'race'
- From verb to noun (referring to the very notion of the verb, in general terms)
  e.g. soro 'talk; → sorosoro 'speech, message, language'.

Structurally, Araki has three types of reduplication

==== CV reduplication ====
The first syllable of the word is reduplicated.

nar̄u → nanar̄u ('son', 'sons')
lokuro → lolokuro ('angry')
levosai → lelevosai ('intelligent')

==== CVCV reduplication ====
The first two syllables of the word are reduplicated.

m̈ar̄ahu → m̈ar̄am̈ar̄ahu ('fear', 'be afraid')
vejulu → vejuvejulu ('colour')
hurar̄a → hurahurar̄a ('dirt', 'small particles of dirt')

==== Root reduplication ====
The entire root of the word is reduplicated.

rev̈e → rev̈erev̈e ('pull')
alo → aloalo ('sun', 'to be sunny')
soro → sorosoro ('talk', 'speech, message, language')

== Clause structure ==
As mentioned above, Araki is a strict SVO language, so different sentence types, such as assertives, imperatives and interrogatives do not involve a change in word order (contrary to many European languages). These sentence types may differ in other ways.

=== Imperatives ===
All imperative sentences take irrealis modality, since they refer to virtual events. The verb must be preceded by its subject clitic.

O r̄uen-i-á!
2sg help-TR-OBJ:1sg
'Help me!'

Thus, except for prosody, all imperative sentences are formally identical with sentences expressing an intent or a near future (for example, 'you should help me' or ' you are going to help me').

A negative order does not use the usual negation marker je, but the modal clitic kan 'Prohibitive':

Na kan sa lo ima-na.
1sg:Irr PROH {go.up} LOC house-3sg
'I should not go / I am not supposed to go to his house'.

=== Interrogatives ===
Interrogative sentences can take either realis or irrealis modality.
Yes/No questions are similar to the corresponding question, except for prosody.
Quite often, the interrogative is marked by a final tag ... vo mo-je-re ... 'or not?'.
In WH-questions, the interrogative words take the same slot as the word they replace (that is, they remain in-situ.

Arakian Interrogative words include sa 'what', se 'who', v̈e 'where', ngisa 'when', and visa 'how many'. The interrogative article ('what X, which') is sava, a longer form of sa. It comes before a noun, for example sava hina 'what thing'. Two interrogative words are derived from sa 'what': sohe sa 'like what → how' and m̈ar̄a sa 'because of what → why'.

=== Negation ===
The general negation marker is a single morpheme je, which is used in all negative sentences except imperative. It always comes at the beginning of the predicate phrase, following the subject clitic. It can be combined to Realis or Irrealis mood.

The negation je combines with other elements, for example aspect markers, to build complex negative morphemes. For example,

- Negation je + aspect le 'again' → 'no longer'
- Negation je + aspect m̈isi 'still' → 'not yet'
- Negation je + partitive r̄e 'some' → 'not any'
- Negation je + NP r̄e hina 'some thing' → 'nothing'
- Negation je + adverb n-r̄e-ran 'on some day' → 'never'

The combination {negation je + Verb + partitive r̄e in object position}, has the frequent effect of implying the non-existence of this object. The construction {je r̄e + N} has been grammaticalised into a complect predicate je r̄e, meaning 'do not exist, not to be'.

=== Existential sentences ===
Since the combination je r̄e has generalized to form a negative existential predicate, one could expect that, in a second stage of evolution, affirmative existential sentences (that is, 'there is N') would simply use the same predicate r̄e without the negation. In fact, this is normally impossible.

Affirmative existential sentences never use r̄e, but have to employ other strategies. These include the use of the predicate mo hese 'one', or a locative phrase.

== Complex sentences ==
=== Coordination ===
Coordination as a clause-linker is far from being widespread in Araki: clause-chaining is by far the preferred strategy. Nevertheless, some coordinators exist, whose meaning is more precise than just 'and'.

The most frequent coordinator is pani ~ pan 'and, but', which usually carries an adversive meaning:

Jam je levse lesi-a, pani nia mo r̄oho r̄o.
1inc:R NEG know see-OBJ:3sg but 3sg 3:R stay IPFV
'We are not able to see him [ghost], yet he is around'.

The word for 'or' is voni ~ von ~ vo.

M̈ar̄a 'because' can be said to have coordinating effects.

Frequent use is made of the Bislama coordinator 'ale (derived from the French allez). Possible meanings are 'OK; then; now; so; finally'.

NP coordination 'X and Y' can be translated into Araki in three different ways:

- the noun-like preposition nira- 'with';
- the comitative suffix -n(i), only with free pronouns;
- the numeral r̄olu 'three → and', with personal pronouns.

=== Conditional systems ===
Araki has three markers corresponding to English 'if': vara, ar̄u, jore. Surprisingly, two of these three markers are compatible with realis modality.

1. Jo re 'suppose, let us say that → if' is the only marker that is incompatible with realis modality. It can refer to a possible situation in the future, or it can present a counter-factual hypothesis about the present.
2. Ar̄u appears only with realis modality in the conditional clause (the main clause may bear realis or irrealis marking). It can refer either to a possible hypothesis about the future, or to a counter-factual situation in the past.
3. Vara is a common subordinator in Araki, probably deriving etymologically from the root varai 'say, tell'. When used in a topic clause, vara is most often associated to realis mood. It can refer either to a single event in the past (English 'when'), to a generic event in the global situation (English 'whenever'), or to a possible event in the future (English 'when', 'if', 'in case').

=== Clause chaining ===
Clause chaining is the combination of at least two clauses (C_{1} and C_{2}), without any coordinator, subordinator or any other kind of overt link between them. On prosodic criteria, no pause is audible at their boundary, at least no such pause as between two autonomous sentences. Contrary to verb serialization, every verb must be preceded by its own subject clitic, whether or not it refers to the same subject as the preceding verb. A sentence like the following is perfectly common in Araki:

R̄aju mo var̄i-a sule mo plan-i-a mo sa mo jovi mo sivo.
man 3:R take-OBJ:3sg stone 3:R throw-TR-OBJ:3sg 3:R {go.up} 3:R fall 3:R {go.down}
'A man takes a stone and throws it (so that it goes) up and falls down (again).'

Notice the ambiguity of the sentence: it is only the context that makes clear that what falls down is actually the stone, not the man. The high frequency of clause chaining constructions makes the clitic mo (third person realis, singular or plural) by far the most frequent word encountered in actual discourse.

Clause chaining can be used to describe a wide variety of situations:

- Time succession and consequence
- Two phases of a single complex action
- Simultaneity of two events
- Commenting on an action
- Spatial dynamics
- Temporal dynamics
- Sentential objects
- Relative clauses
- Numeral phrases

== Language preservation ==
In June 2008, the Jacques Chirac Foundation for Sustainable Development and Cultural Dialogue announced its intention to focus on preserving the Araki language. This language is cited as an example, among many others, of the situation of language endangerment which the Chirac Foundation aims at addressing, especially through its programme "Sorosoro: Pour que vivent les langues du monde". Sorosoro is itself an Araki word, meaning "breath, speech, language".

== Notes and references ==
=== Bibliography ===
- François, Alexandre (2002). Araki: A disappearing language of Vanuatu (PDF). Pacific Linguistics. Vol. 522. Canberra: Australian National University. hdl:1885/146137. ISBN 0-85883-493-6.
- François, Alexandre (2008). "An online Araki-English-French dictionary". Archived (PDF) from the original on 15 June 2008.
- François, Alexandre (2012), "Ditransitive alignment and referential hierarchies in Araki", Linguistic Discovery, 10 (3): 97–124, doi:10.1349/ps1.1537-0852.a.418.
- Grimes, Barbara, ed. (1996). Ethnologue: Languages of the World (13th ed.). Dallas, TX: Summer Institute of Linguistics.
- Miller, J. G. (1990). Live Book 7: Santo and Malo. New South Wales: Mission Publication of Australia.
- Tryon, D. T. (1972). "The languages of the New Hebrides: A checklist and general survey". In Beaumont, C.; Tryon, D. T.; Wurm, S. A. (eds.). Papers in Linguistics of Melanesia, Series A-33. Pacific Linguistics.
- Vari-Bogiri, Hannah (2008). "A Sociolinguistic Survey of Araki: A Dying Language of Vanuatu". Journal of Multilingual and Multicultural Development. 26 (1): 52–66. doi:10.1080/14790710508668398. S2CID 41801304.
