= Malvapevu =

Uninhabited island in Sanma Province, Vanuatu

- Interactive map of Malvapevu

Geography
- Location: Pacific Ocean
- Coordinates: 15°22′00″S 167°11′00″E
- Archipelago: Vanuatu
- Highest elevation: 12 m (39 ft)

Administration
- Vanuatu
- Province: Sanma Province

Demographics
- Population: 0 (2015)
- Ethnic groups: None

Malvapevu (also Malvapévu or Vaucluse Island) is a small uninhabited island in Sanma Province of Vanuatu in the Pacific Ocean.

== Geography ==
Malvapevu lies off the eastern coast of Espiritu Santo, which is the largest island in the nation of Vanuatu. The estimated terrain elevation above sea level is some 12 meters.
