= Grade-taking =

Grade-taking is a term used in anthropology for social systems under which individuals rise in status and authority by performing a series of ceremonies. Grade-taking was the system of leadership in pre-colonial societies of northern Vanuatu, typically involving the killing of valuable pigs; it is still actively practiced in some areas.

With each grade, a participant acquires a named rank, and the right to display certain insignia or perform certain rituals. The specifics vary between cultures. Lower grades are typically taken in one's youth and involve the killing of only one or a few low-value pigs. However, at the highest grades hundreds of pigs may be killed, including valuable 'tusker boars'. Although there is a clear hierarchy of grades, they do not necessarily need to be taken in strict sequence, and individuals with sufficient resources may occasionally skip grades and move directly to higher levels.

Grade-taking is primarily a male activity, but in some areas there are parallel grade-taking systems practiced by women.

== Grade-taking and chiefdom ==
The concept of a "chief" - an individual with specific authority over a community, rather than a ranked assortment of men with varying degrees of power and influence, was introduced to northern Vanuatu following contact with Europeans. Having a high rank in the grade-taking system is not technically the same as being a chief, though the two concepts are widely conflated, and chiefs tend to be individuals of high rank in the grade-taking system.

Individuals of high rank in grade-taking societies generally wield authority only within their own local communities. Although some may sit as representatives on national and regional Councils of Chiefs, there is no traditional concept of a "paramount chief" with authority over an entire region.

== Grade-taking by area ==
=== Torres and Banks Islands ===
In the languages of the Torres and Banks Islands, the grade-taking system is known under various names, all descended from a same root *suᵐbʷe. The spelling suqe [suk͡pʷe] is more frequent in the literature, due to the special attention given to the Mota language since works by Codrington.

=== Malekula ===
On the island of Malekula the grade-taking system is known as nimangki, and in some areas it is extremely elaborate, with up to 35 grades.

=== Pentecost Island ===
Grade-taking is actively practised in Anglican and Catholic areas on Pentecost Island, and in traditional kastom villages, although it has been suppressed in areas dominated by the Churches of Christ. On Pentecost the practice has no special name, but is referred to simply by terms such as "pig business".

In North and Central Pentecost, the titles of the main grades are Tari, Mol or Moli, Liwus or Livusi, and Vii or Vira. There are multiple steps within some of these grades. Each grade is conferred at a ceremony in which the grade is 'bought' from an individual who already holds that rank. With each grade, a man acquires an additional name (known in Raga as ihan boe "pig name"), which reflects his rank. For example, a man who has taken the Mol grade may be given a name such as Molbaga, Moltoo or Molbwet. Depending on the grade, he may also acquire the right to wear certain insignia and the right to dance to certain drumbeats. A Vii or Vira is a man of significant authority - loosely, a "chief" - who has the right to impose fines on others. In Central Pentecost those who reach the very top level of the graded society are referred to as Tanmwonok (literally "ground finishing"); those who do so with resources still to spare are known as Mwariak ("remaining").

In addition, there is parallel grade-taking hierarchy for women, culminating in the rank of Motaa or Motari.

The system in South Pentecost is broadly similar although the details of the grades differ.

== See also ==
- Narave pig
