= Malparavu =

Uninhabited island in Vanuatu

- Interactive map of Malparavu

Geography
- Location: Pacific Ocean
- Coordinates: 15°23′00″S 167°11′00″E
- Archipelago: Vanuatu
- Highest elevation: 15 m (49 ft)

Administration
- Vanuatu
- Province: Sanma Province

Demographics
- Population: 0 (2015)
- Ethnic groups: None

Malparavu (also Île Mounparap, Île Matté Vulu) is a small uninhabited island in Sanma Province of Vanuatu in the Pacific Ocean.

== Geography ==
Malparavu lies off the eastern coast of Espiritu Santo, which is the largest island in the nation of Vanuatu. The estimated terrain elevation above sea level is 15 meters.
