= Maltinerava =

Vanuatu island

- Interactive map of Maltinerava

Geography
- Location: Pacific Ocean
- Coordinates: 15°26′00″S 167°12′00″E
- Archipelago: Vanuatu
- Highest elevation: 38 m (125 ft)

Administration
- Vanuatu
- Province: Sanma Province

Demographics
- Population: 0 (2015)
- Ethnic groups: None

Maltinerava (also Île Pénoui, Île Pénouni) is a small uninhabited island in Sanma Province of Vanuatu in the Pacific Ocean.

== Geography ==
Maltinerava lies off the eastern coast of Espiritu Santo, which is the largest island in the nation of Vanuatu. The estimated terrain elevation above sea level is 38 meters.
