= Mavia (island) =

Island in Vanuatu

Native name: Mav̋ea
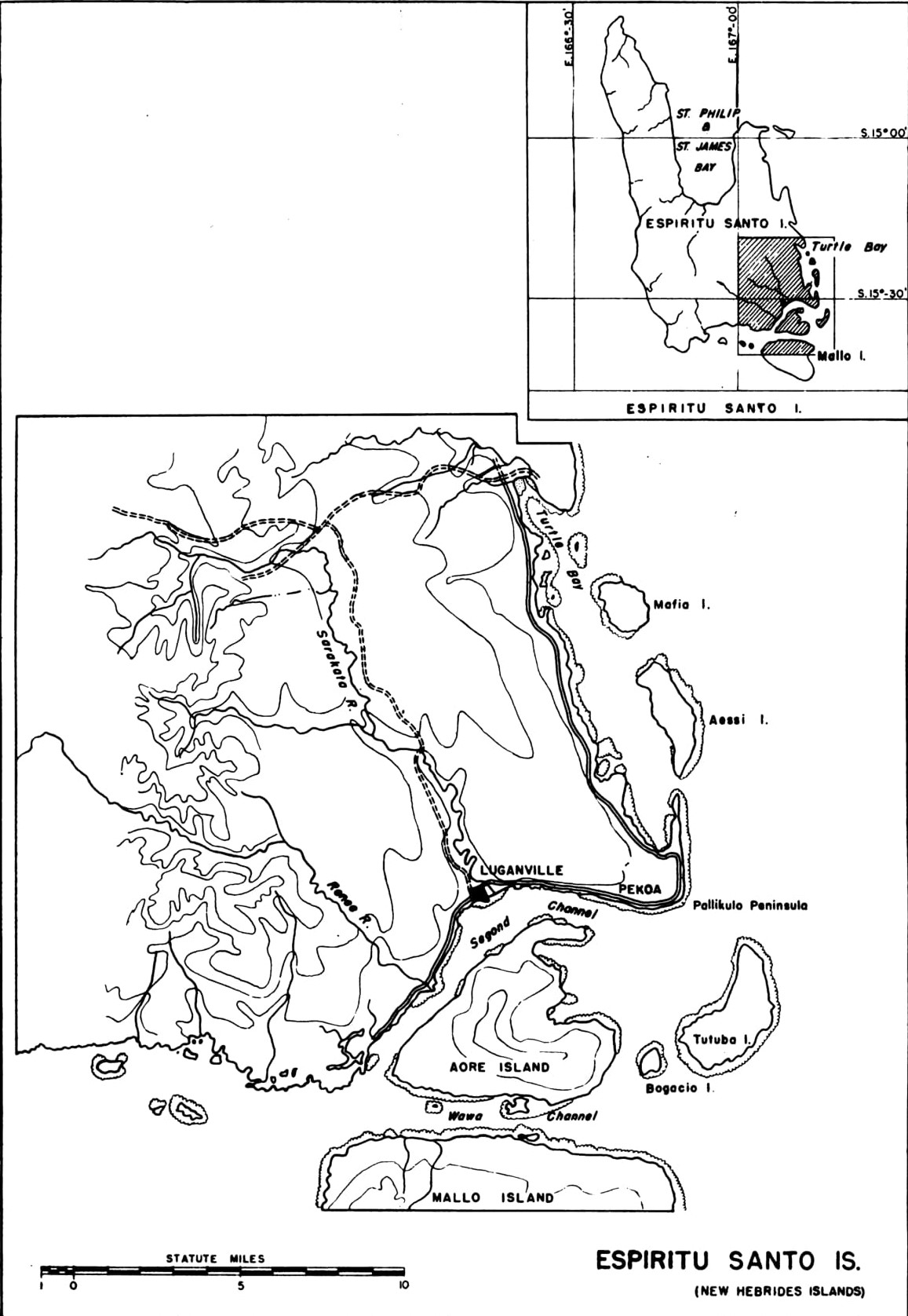
- Labelled as Mafia Island

Geography
- Location: Pacific Ocean
- Coordinates: 15.3847°0′S 167.2319°0′E
- Archipelago: Vanuatu
- Area: 47 km^{2} (18 sq mi)
- Highest elevation: 63 m (207 ft)

Administration
- Vanuatu
- Province: Sanma Province

Demographics
- Population: 232 (2015)
- Ethnic groups: Melanesian

Mavia or Mavea (known locally as Mav̋ea [mað̼ea]) is an inhabited island in Sanma Province of Vanuatu in the Pacific Ocean. The island lies off the eastern coast of Espiritu Santo. The estimated terrain elevation above the sea level is some 63 metres.

== Population and language ==
As of 2015, the official local population was 232 people in 47 households.

Some 30 local people speak the endangered Mavea language. There are at least another 30 Mavea speakers who have left the island permanently to live throughout Vanuatu, mainly on Espiritu Santo Island (in the villages of Deproma and Matevulu), Aore Island, and in Port Vila, the capital city of Vanuatu. All Mavea speakers are bilingual in Bislama, one of the official languages of Vanuatu.
