= Malo (island) =

Island in Vanuatu

Tamambo
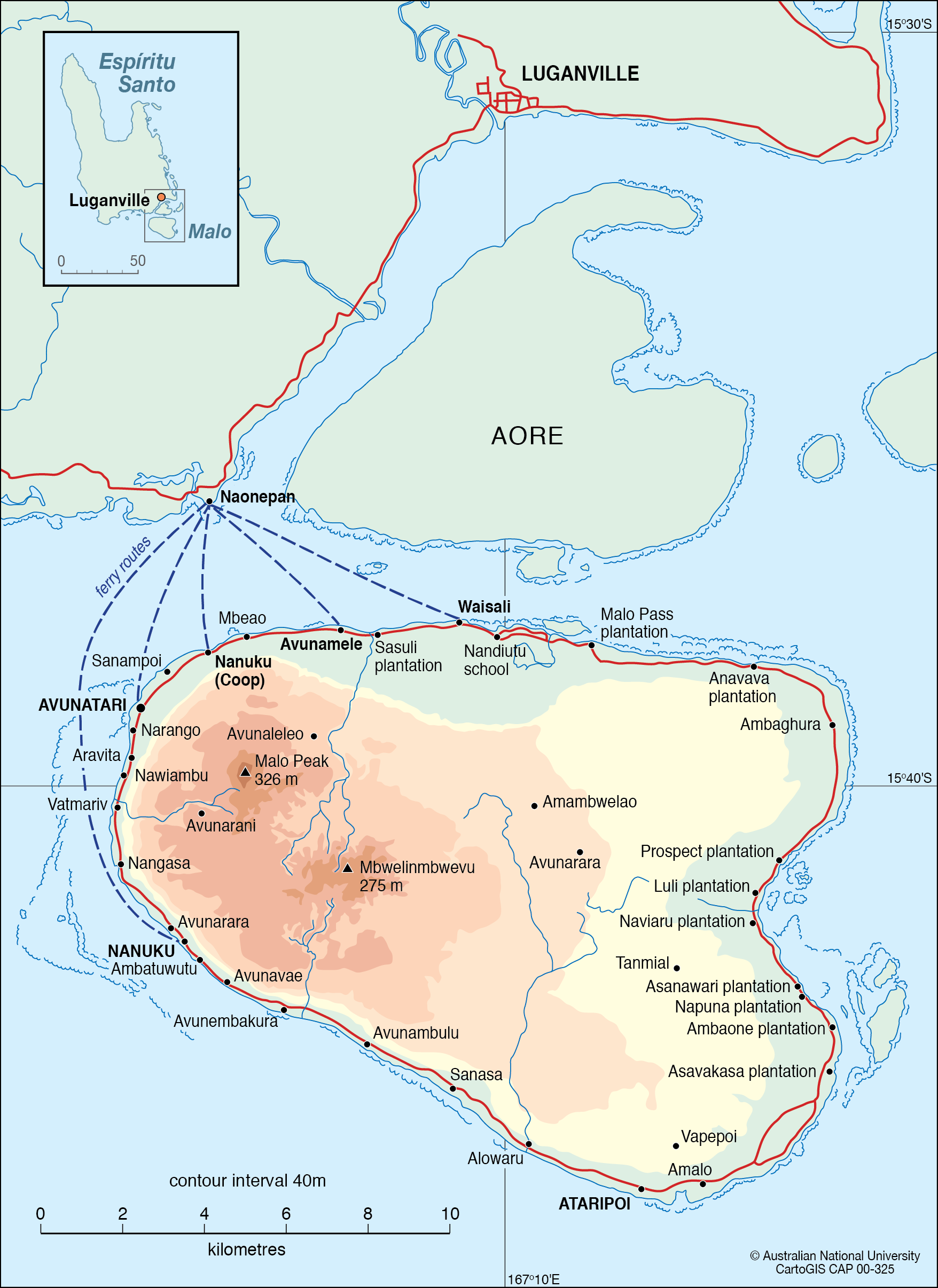
- Map of the island

- Location within Vanuatu

Geography
- Location: Pacific Ocean
- Coordinates: 15°41′S 167°10′E
- Archipelago: New Hebrides
- Area: 180 km^{2} (69 sq mi)
- Highest elevation: 326 m (1070 ft)

Administration
- Vanuatu
- Province: Sanma

Demographics
- Population: 4,273 (2009)
- Ethnic groups: Ni-Vanuatu

Malo (formerly known as St. Bartholomew) is an island in Vanuatu 3 km (1.9 mi) off the southern coast of Vanuatu's largest island, Espiritu Santo, in Sanma Province. It has a circumference of 55 km (34 mi) and an area of 180 km^{2} (69 sq mi). It is 17 kilometres or 11 miles long, and 13 kilometres or 8.1 miles across at its widest point. The highest point on the island is Mount Malo (326 metres or 1,070 feet).

The climate is perhumid tropical. The average annual rainfall is roughly 3,000 millimetres or 120 inches. The island is frequently subjected to cyclones and earthquakes.

== Geography ==
Like most of the islands of Vanuatu, Malo is of volcanic origin. The highest point on the island is Malo Peak, which rises to 326 m (1,070 ft) above sea level.

The main products of the island are copra and cocoa. Both crops are grown on plantations.

== Natural history ==
A 5,650 hectares or 13,960 acres tract, encompassing the western end of the island, has been recognised as an Important Bird Area (IBA) by BirdLife International, because it supports populations of Vanuatu megapodes, Vanuatu kingfishers, palm lorikeets, fan-tailed gerygones, and Vanuatu white-eyes.

The pseudohermaphroditic Narave pig is found on the island. The people of Malo Island consider the pig to be sacred.

== Demographics ==
In 1979, the island had a population of 2,312. The 1999 census found a population of 3,532. By the 2009 census, the total population had grown to 4,273, an increase of 21% since 1999. Avunatari (Abnetare), the main center on the northwest coast, had 600 people in 1999.

There are two main cultural groups on the island of Malo: the group of Auta in the west, and the group of Tinjivo in the east. Both these groups speak a variant of the Tamambo language (which is also called Malo).

The earliest archaeological evidence of human habitation in Vanuatu is from a site on Malo that was settled circa 1400 BC. Artifacts from this early settlement are characteristic of the Lapita culture.
