= Champagne Beach (Dominica) =

Beach in Dominica

Coordinates: 15.294°N 61.385°W

Champagne Beach is located on the island of Dominica in Caribbean Sea south of Roseau. This beach was named "Champagne Beach" because of small gas bubbles continuously rise from the volcanic sea floor creating fantastic underwater scenery, which is with combination of crystal-clear water and extensive marine life is perfect for snorkeling and diving. The beach itself is very rocky with black volcanic sand in spots.
