= Lataro =

Island in Vanuatu

- Interactive map of Lataro

Geography
- Location: Pacific Ocean
- Coordinates: 15°16′00″S 167°11′00″E
- Archipelago: Vanuatu
- Area: 3.22 km^{2} (1.24 sq mi)
- Highest elevation: 88 m (289 ft)

Administration
- Vanuatu
- Province: Sanma Province

Demographics
- Population: Uninhabited (2015)
- Ethnic groups: None

Lataro (alternatively spelled Latoro, Litaro, or Le-tharo; also called Satoshi Island or Pilot Island) is an uninhabited island in Sanma Province of Vanuatu in the Pacific Ocean.

== Geography ==
Lataro lies off of the eastern coast of Espiritu Santo at the edge of Shark Bay, a few kilometers northwest of neighboring Lataroa, and is flat. The highest point of the island is 88 meters above the sea level. The island spans 1.9 km from the north to the south and 2.3 km from the east to the west.

== History ==
The island has been leased by Anthony Welch, a retired British property investor, since 2007 under a 75-year lease.

In 2022, a Marshall Islands based DAO (Decentralized Autonomous Organization) headed by Denys Troyak was granted a license to use the island for a cryptocurrency based development. At the same time, the island was unofficially renamed Satoshi Island in honor of Satoshi Nakamoto, the inventor of bitcoin. The island was to be turned into a home for bitcoin investors.

In July 2025, trading in Satoshi Island digital assets was suspended by the DAO "due to failure to comply with key terms of the land lease".
