= Thion (Vanuatu) =

Island in Vanuatu

- Interactive map of Thion

Geography
- Location: Pacific Ocean
- Coordinates: 15°2′00″S 167°5′00″E
- Archipelago: Vanuatu
- Highest elevation: 213 m (699 ft)

Administration
- Vanuatu
- Province: Sanma Province

Demographics
- Population: 0 (2015)
- Ethnic groups: None

Thion (also Dolphin Island) is a small uninhabited island in Sanma Province of Vanuatu in the Pacific Ocean.

== Geography ==
Thion lies a few kilometers in Shark Bay off the eastern coast of Espiritu Santo. The estimated terrain elevation above the sea level is some 213 meters. The islet has two fresh-water lakes. Thion was not always uninhabited. There is an old abandoned cattle ranch there. Nowadays, however, the island is uninhabited and is only used for picnicking by the locals. Thion Island is also known as Dolphin Island because of its profile.
