= Araki (island) =

Araki Raki
- Island
- Location in Vanuatu
- Coordinates: 15°37′55″S 166°57′11″E
- Country: Vanuatu
- Province: Sanma Province

Area
  - Total: 2.5 km^{2} (0.97 sq mi)

Population (2009)
  - Total: 140
  - Density: 56/km^{2} (150/sq mi)
- Time zone: UTC+11 (VUT)

Araki (native name Raki) is a small rocky island with an area of 2.5 km^{2}, located 3 miles off the southern shores of Espiritu Santo, which is the largest island in the nation of Vanuatu.

It belongs to the archipelago of the New Hebrides in the Pacific region of Melanesia. It is in the Sanma Province of Vanuatu.

== Population ==
Given its small dimensions, it is not surprising that Araki has always had a low population. Census records as early as 1897 give 103 islanders, while there were 112 in 1989, and 121 in 1999. According to the 2009 census, there were 140. However, this number does not accurately reflect the number of persons, who really live permanently on Araki: because of sustenance difficulties, many Arakians are forced to seek work on the main island of Espiritu Santo. As a result, several men, or even whole families, divide their time between the island and the mainland.

The Arakian community is divided into 5 hamlets or villages. From west to east, these are: Pelinta, Parili, Parili-Aru, Vinapahura, and Sope. These are essentially extended family clans; these clans can be referred to as 'vapa' (literally 'cave'). In addition, there is a common area close to Sope, called the Mission. This is where the church, meeting house, cooperative, aid post, the Chief's house, the Pastor's house, and the women's club house are located.

== Income sources ==
As is often the case in rural areas of Vanuatu, most of the inhabitants of Araki are subsistence farmers, exploiting the resources of land and sea for their own consumption; they also breed pigs and poultry. At the same time, many Arakians have developed various trade activities as sources of income:

- culture of copra and especially cocoa
- local stores and bakery
- selling crabs, coconut crabs, fish, and fruit, to the local market of Luganville.

For many Arakians, inland activities do not generate sufficient income. Therefore, they prefer to cultivate larger slots in the mainland Santo, or even choose to live in the local capital Luganville.

== Language ==
The native inhabitants of Araki speak a unique language, called Araki after the island. The language is becoming extinct, as a result of contact of its speakers with neighbouring languages. Today, there are about 5 native speakers of Araki language.

At encounters on the mainland, Arakians are exposed to languages other than their own - especially to Tangoa language and to the pidgin Bislama. The influence of Tangoa language is increased through inter-island marriages and through missionary and church influence, as church services are usually carried out in Bislama or Tangoa, and only occasionally in Araki language.

The public school system is also another cause for the decreasing use of Araki language. First, because secondary school is officially held in French or English. Second, because the teachers usually come from different places of Vanuatu, and therefore speak Bislama. Third, because Araki only has a kindergarten and a primary school, in such a way that children are forced to continue their schooling on the mainland.
