= Mount Tabwemasana =

Highest peak in Vanuatu

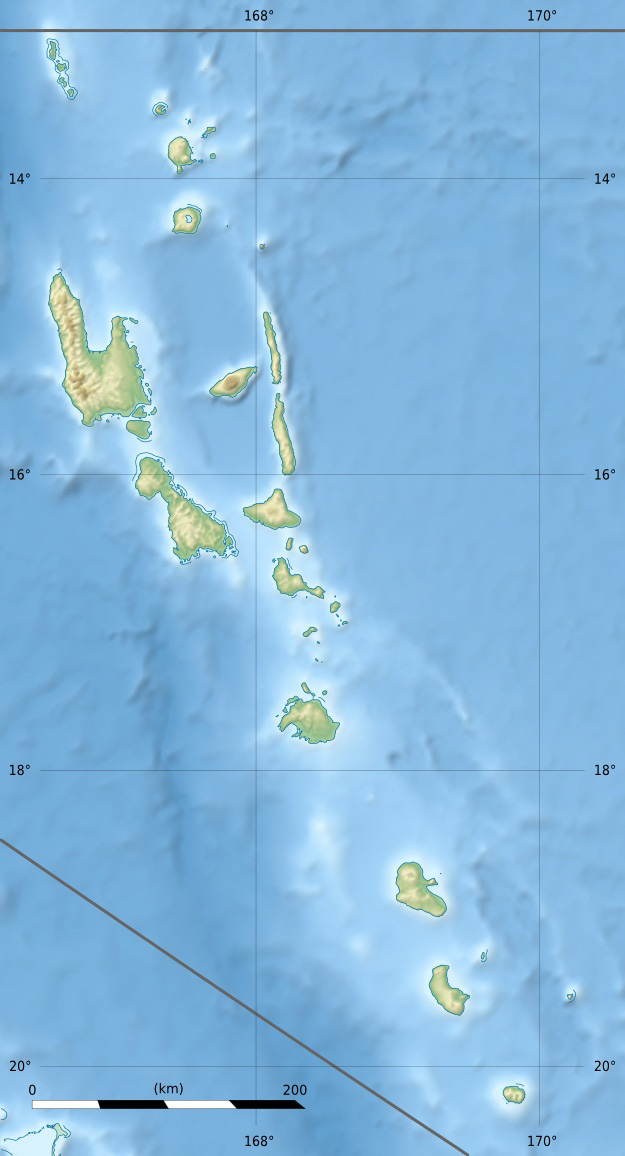
- Location within Vanuatu

Highest point
- Elevation: 1,879 m (6,165 ft)
- Prominence: 1,879 m (6,165 ft)
- Listing: Country high point Ultra; Ribu
- Coordinates: 15°21′45″S 166°45′18″E

Geography
- Location: Espiritu Santo, Vanuatu

Mount Tabwemasana is the highest peak in Vanuatu, and one of the highest mountains in the Pacific. At 1,879 metres (6,165 ft), Tabwemasana towers above the surrounding mountains and provides fantastic views toward the Coral Sea in East. Located on the isolated west coast of the island of Espiritu Santo. Mount Tabwemasana actually consists of two peaks and local folklore believes that these two peaks (male and female) come together in embrace at night.

Until the 1970s the village of Kerepua was located on the flanks of Tabwemasana, a full day's walk to the coast through thick rainforest. However, in the late 1970s like many other mountain villages, Kerepua was relocated to the coast and now provides the launching pad for any summit attempt.

Very few tourists climb Tabwemasana each year, with the number reaching the summit generally less than six persons per year. This is primarily due to the isolated location of the mountain and the physical difficulty of ascending the peak. Those wishing to climb Tabwemasana must first take a boat from the village of Tasiriki to Kerepua. From Kerepua you trek up a river before leaving the valley for a steep ascent up the mountain. Guides are required as the track is very difficult to follow.

The tree species Metrosideros tabwemasanaensis is found only on Mount Tabwemasana.

== See also ==
- List of ultras of Oceania
