= Elephant Island (Vanuatu) =

Uninhabited island in Sanma Province of Vanuatu

- Interactive map of Elephant Island

Geography
- Location: Pacific Ocean
- Coordinates: 14°57′45″S 167°7′58.8″E
- Archipelago: Vanuatu

Administration
- Vanuatu
- Province: Sanma Province

Demographics
- Population: 0 (2015)
- Ethnic groups: None

Elephant Island is an uninhabited island in Sanma Province of Vanuatu in the Pacific Ocean. Another island off the coast of Antarctica in the outer reaches of the South Shetland Islands, in the Southern Ocean, shares the same name.

== Geography ==
It is located in Turtle Bay off the east coast of Espiritu Santo Island.
