= Lataroa =

Island in Vanuatu

- Interactive map of Lataroa

Geography
- Location: Pacific Ocean
- Coordinates: 15°18′00″S 167°14′00″E
- Archipelago: Vanuatu

Administration
- Vanuatu
- Province: Sanma Province

Demographics
- Population: Uninhabited (2019)
- Ethnic groups: None

Lataroa (alternatively spelled Le-theroa) is an uninhabited island in Sanma Province of Vanuatu in the Pacific Ocean.

== Geography ==
Lataroa lies off of the eastern coast of Espiritu Santo, a few kilometers southeast of Shark Bay and neighboring Lataro. Lataroa has a clean, white sand beach with fringing reef on the western side.
