= Sakao (Sanma, Vanuatu) =

Sakao Lathi
- Island
- Location in Vanuatu
- Coordinates: 14°57′38″S 167°07′55″E
- Country: Vanuatu
- Province: Sanma Province

Population
  - Total: 0
- Time zone: UTC+11 (VUT)

Sakao, locally known as Lathi or Laðhi, is an uninhabited island in Vanuatu. It is located off the northeastern shore of Vanuatu's largest island Espiritu Santo in Sanma Province, and off the southeastern shore of Vanuatu's second-largest island, Malakula. The island has given its name to the Sakao language, spoken in the nearby area of Port-Olry.

== Name ==
The name Sakao is an exonym meaning "coral reef", from Proto-Oceanic *sakaRu. The native name Lathi or Laðhi comes from a Sakao word, of unknown origin.

== See also ==
- List of islands of Vanuatu
