= Champagne Beach (Vanuatu) =

Beach on the island of Espiritu Santo in Vanuatu

Coordinates: 15.143792°S 167.120381°E

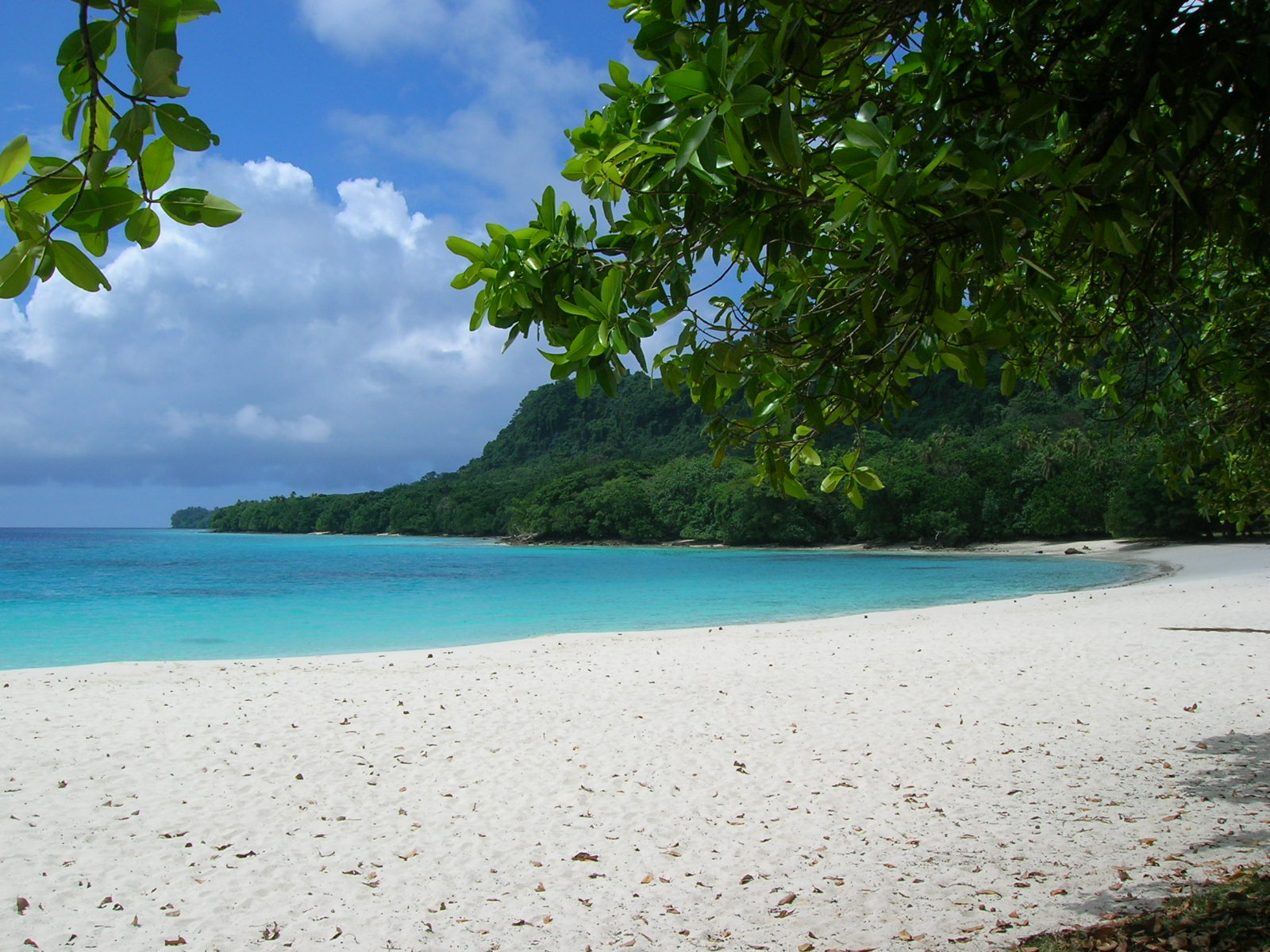
Champagne Beach

Champagne Beach is a beach located on the island of Espiritu Santo in Vanuatu. The beach is famous for its crystal clear waters and powdery white sands, which make it ideal for snorkeling. It is visited regularly by tourists and cruise boats from Australia.

Its name comes from the shape of its coastline, which resembles a champagne flute.

Champagne Beach is near the village Hog Harbour.
