= Bokissa =

- Island
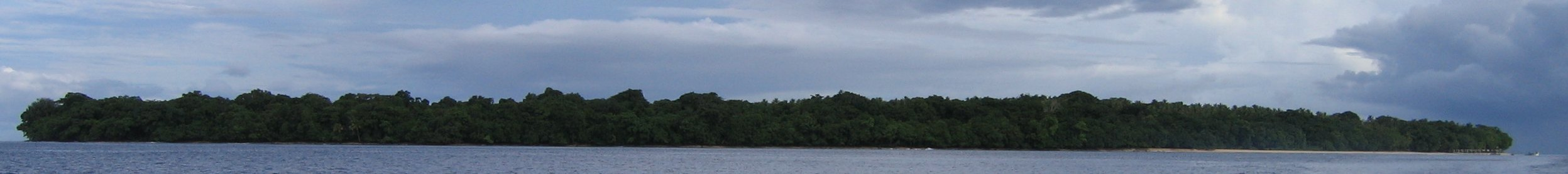
- Bokissa Island, Vanuatu

- Location in Vanuatu
- Coordinates: 15°35′26″S 167°14′45″E
- Country: Vanuatu
- Province: Sanma Province

Population (2009)
  - Total: 56
- Time zone: UTC+11 (VUT)

Bokissa (also Voisa or Abokisa) is a very small island in the South Pacific island nation of Vanuatu located 10 km (6 mi) south of Espiritu Santo.

The island is owned and run as a tourist resort and is promoted as being managed in an environmentally responsible manner.

== Population ==
There were 56 people living on the island, according to the 2009 census.
