= Hog Harbour =

- Village
- Location in Vanuatu
- Coordinates: 15°08′S 167°06′E
- Country: Vanuatu
- Province: Sanma Province
- Island: Espiritu Santo

Population (2009)
  - Total: 1,000
- Time zone: UTC+11 (VUT)

Hog Harbour is a village in the island of Espiritu Santo in Vanuatu.

It is located in northeast Santo, south of Port Olry village and north of Lathë village. There are many kinships ties between the villages of Hog Harbour, Port Olry, Sara, Kole 1 and 2, and Lathë.

The village schools are anglophone but the Ni-Vanuatu language spoken there is called Nkep. It is very similar to Sakao spoken in Port Olry.

== History ==
The village is a strong base of the Presbyterian Church. In 1897, Dr Bowie, who was then a Scottish missionary had first established the Presbyterian Church mission in Hog Harbour.

The derivation of the name Hog Harbour is unknown for certain. One version has it that when the explorers of the Island anchored in the harbour, amazingly they saw that the harbour was full of pigs; in light of this, they named it Hog Harbour. There is no documentary reference to support this. Another version is that it derives from the preponderance of sea oak trees found along the coastline, oak giving hoak in the dominant local pronunciation of Bislama; hoak then being reinterpreted as hog as a back-formation by anglophones because voiced final stops such as /g/ are often devoiced in Bislama. (This derivation was provided by Elder Manasseh Vocor, a life-long resident; other locals subscribe to the 'abundance of pigs' derivation.)

British biologist John R. Baker (1928) reported to have seen "no fewer than 125 intersex [pigs] in one single day at Hog Harbour" (see also Narave pig). It should be noted, however, that this is not necessarily an indication of the prevalence of pigs (intersex or otherwise) in Hog Harbour itself, as Baker's account also makes it clear that the occasion on which he saw this many pigs was a trading event, in which "many young intersexes for a few old ones brought from another island was taking place". Baker's chief claim about the abundance of intersex pigs is that they are mainly associated with the northern islands of Vanuatu.

During the time of the British–French Condominium, Hog Harbour was then the site of the British district administration. Hog Harbour was also the base camp for the Oxford University New Hebrides Expedition led by John R. Baker (August 1933-January 1934)

Before and at Independence (July 1980), Hog Harbour was aligned with the incoming anglophone Vanua'aku Party. During the Santo Rebellion, the village was attacked 21 August 1980 by pro-secessionists. Despite the exchange of gunfire on both sides, only one person was wounded seriously enough to require hospital treatment in Luganville. (Beasant, who was in Port Vila during the rebellion, says "two people" but local oral history suggests this confuses two separate altercations involving Hog Harbour residents.)

== Population ==
Hog Harbour to date has changed dramatically, with the village growing rapidly in population size and development is taking lead as well . The village has a population of approximately 1,000 people. It has English primary and secondary schools, though Bislama is the primary language. It has a dispensary which provides medical intervention to the locals. There is a large Presbyterian Church building which is located at the top of the village's hill. The vast majority of people are members of the Presbyterian Church.

The community is divided into three administrative units (known as Group 1, Group 2 and Group 3). These are the basis of the division of collective labour and are orthogonal to traditional clan lines. Traditional marriages should cross the clan lines of white and red clans. The most extensive written records on Hog Harbour from the first half of the 20th century are letters from the missionary Mrs Kay Anderson (née Milne, born on Nguna) to the linguist Arthur Capell. These are held in the PARADISEC archives.

The village has a local chief, who presides over matters and disputes among villagers. This chiefly position is distinct from kastom (traditional) chief ranking, that is, the highest ranked village chief is not necessarily the highest ranked kastom chief.

== Transportation ==
As regards transportation, it has improved dramatically. There are many transport vehicles and buses in the village. They provide daily services for people to Luganville, which is the capital city of Santo. Everybody uses this form of transport to transport their goods to be sold in Luganville.

== Sports ==
There is a soccer field located at the centre of the village. Young villagers use the field to play soccer. Rugby is occasionally played on this soccer field. Young people however tended to prefer playing the former rather than the latter. There are netball courts at Prenter Primary School.
