= Espiritu Santo =

Island in Vanuatu

Nickname: Santo
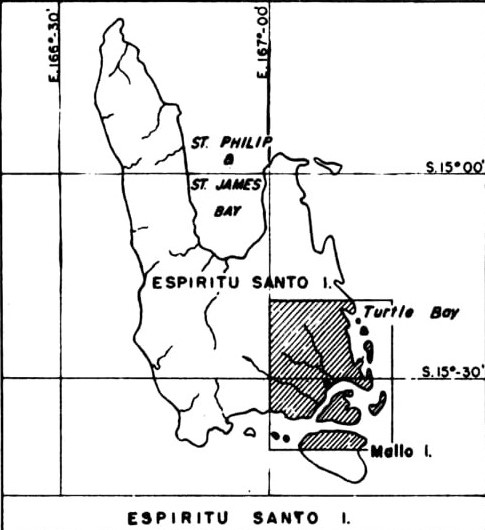

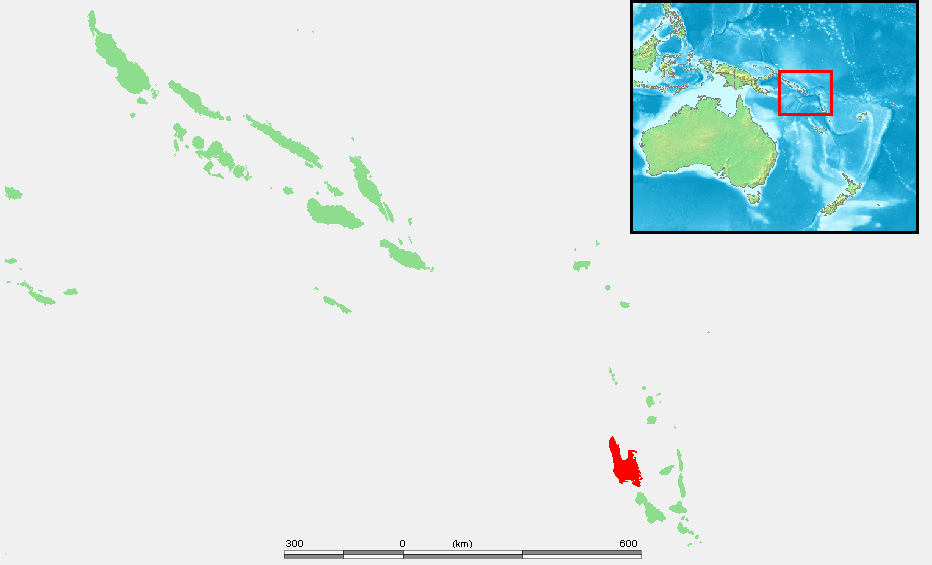
- Map of Espiritu Santo

Geography
- Location: Sanma Province, Vanuatu
- Coordinates: 15°25′S 166°54′E
- Archipelago: New Hebrides
- Area: 3,955.5 km^{2} (1,527.2 sq mi)
- Highest elevation: 1,879 m (6165 ft)
- Highest point: Mount Tabwemasana

Administration
- Vanuatu
- Province: Sanma
- Largest settlement: Luganville

Demographics
- Population: 37,328 (2020)
- Ethnic groups: Ni-Vanuatu

Espiritu Santo, (Note: From the Spanish Espíritu Santo [esˈpiɾitu ˈsanto], "Holy Spirit"; UK: /ɛˌspɪrɪtuː ˈsæntoʊ/, US: /- ˈsɑːntuː, - ˈsɑːntoʊ/; French: [ɛspiʁity sɑ̃to]) usually just called Santo, is the largest island in the nation and archipelago of Vanuatu (formerly the New Hebrides), with an area of 3,955.5 km^{2} (1,527.2 sq mi), although Efate, on which the capital city of Port Vila is located, has a larger population. As of 2020, the population of Santo was 37,328. Luganville is the only true town on the island.

== History ==
=== Early European exploration ===
A Spanish expedition of three ships, led by Portuguese explorer Pedro Fernandes de Queirós, landed in 1606 at Big Bay on the north side of the island. Queirós named the land La Austrialia [sic] del Espíritu Santo in acknowledgment of the Spanish king's descent from the royal House of Austria, and believing he had arrived in the Great Southern Continent, Terra Australis. They entered the bay on 1 and 2 May: the latter being the day of Saints Philip and James, Queirós named it Bahía de San Felipe y Santiago. The local chief tried to chase the Spanish explorers back to their ships, which led to an exchange of arrows and musket-fire, in which the chief was killed. The ships remained for a month at their anchorage "Puerto de la Vera Cruz", with armed sailors making incursions inland for provisions. Queirós announced his intention to found a city, Nova Jerusalem, and appointed municipal officers. In early June, with provisions running low, they left the bay to explore the neighbouring coastline. Queirós' lead ship became separated, and, whether through adverse weather or mutiny, was unable to make anchor in the bay. The almirante (second-in-command, and captain of the second ship), Luis Váez de Torres, searched the coast for signs of shipwreck but found none. He remained until late June, then sailed to the west coast with the intention of circumnavigating what he considered to be an island, not a continent. The wind and current were against this aim, so he left the island sailing west, eventually encountering the previously unexplored southern coast of New Guinea. Torres then found the strait that bears his name between northern Australia and southern New Guinea.

After the departure of Queirós and Torres, Espiritu Santo was not visited again by Europeans until 160 years later, by Louis de Bougainville in 1768 and James Cook in 1774.

=== European settlement ===
During the 19th century, Australian, British, French, and German settlers settled in the territory of the New Hebrides. In 1878, the United Kingdom and France declared all of the New Hebrides to be neutral territory. In 1887, the Anglo-French Joint Naval Commission took charge of the territory. On 9 August 1889, Franceville, an area around present-day Port Vila, declared itself an independent commune under the leadership of elected mayor/president Ferdinand-Albert Chevillard, and with its own red, white and blue flag with five stars. It became one of the first self-governing administrations in recorded history to practise universal suffrage without distinction of sex or race. However, this was short-lived as it was soon suppressed, and by June 1890, Franceville as a commune was reported to have been "practically broken up", and the Naval Commission had resumed control.

Between 1903 and 1905, one of the first major geological studies of Melanesia was produced by Australian geologist Sir Douglas Mawson (later renowned for his expeditions to Antarctica). After spending from April to September 1903 exploring the islands with W.T. Quaife, Mawson produced a report which included geological maps of the islands of Efate and Santo. This was his first major independent geological work. The men travelled to the islands aboard the Ysabel, under the auspices of the British Deputy Commissioner of the New Hebrides, Captain Ernest Rason. (Note: AKA British resident commissioner, 1902-1907) HMS Archer was also used on the trip. Mawson's detailed report, "The Geology of the New Hebrides", was published in the Proceedings of the Linnean Society of New South Wales in December 1905.

In 1906, the naval commission was replaced by a more structured British-French Condominium. During this period, Hog Harbour, on the northeast coast, was the site of the British district administration, while Segond, near Luganville, was the French district administration.

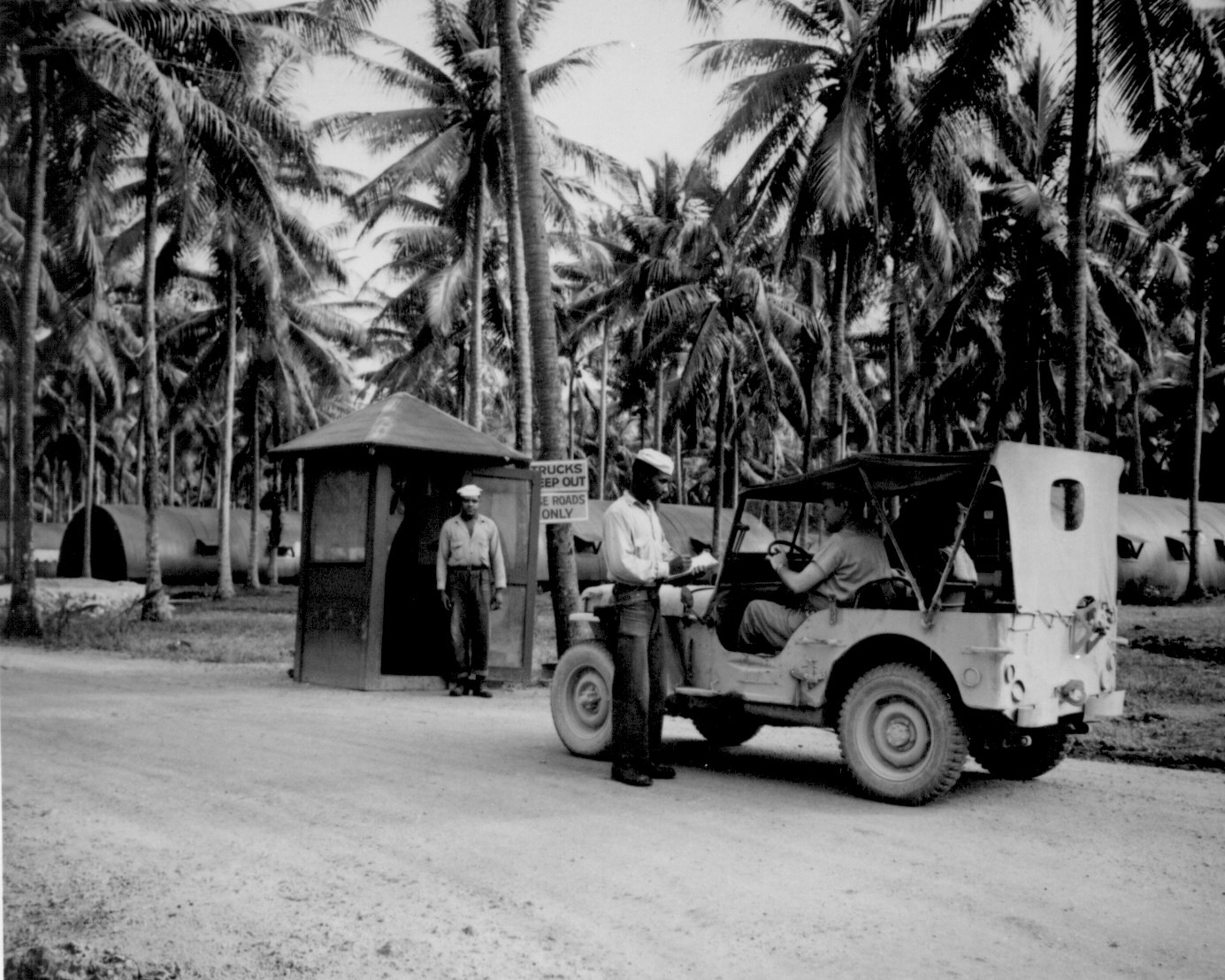
ID check at the entrance to the base during World War II

=== World War II ===
During World War II, particularly after the Japanese attack on Pearl Harbor, the island was used by American naval and air forces as a large military supply and support base, naval harbour, and airfield. Luganville Airfield, also called Bomber Field #3, was a large airfield built by the Seabees of the 40th Naval Construction Battalion in 1943. Also built on the island was Bomber Field No.2 which became Santo-Pekoa International Airport after the war. Palikulo Bay Airfield, also called Bomber Field #1, became part of the main road after the war. Luganville Seaplane Base served the seaplane and Turtle Bay Airfield also called Fighter Field #1 served the fighter planes.

The SS President Coolidge was a converted luxury liner that hit a sea mine during the war and was sunk. The shipwreck off Espiritu Santo later became a popular diving spot.

The presence of the Americans contributed later to the island's tourism in scuba diving, as the Americans dumped most of their used military and naval equipment, and their refuse, at what is now known as "Million Dollar Point".

In highly fictionalized form, this was the location of James A. Michener's Tales of the South Pacific, and of the following Rodgers and Hammerstein musical, South Pacific.

=== 1980s rebellion ===
Between May and August 1980 the island was the site of a rebellion known as the "Coconut War", during the transfer of power over the colonial New Hebrides from the condominium to the independent Vanuatu. Jimmy Stevens' Nagriamel movement, in alliance with private French interests and backed by the Phoenix Foundation and American libertarians hoping to establish a tax-free haven, declared the island of Espiritu Santo to be independent of the new government. The "Republic of Vemerana" was proclaimed on 28 May. France recognised the independence on 3 June. On 5 June, the tribal chiefs of Santo named the French Ambassador Philippe Allonneau the "King of Vemerana", and Jimmy Stevens became the prime minister. Luganville was renamed Allonneaupolis. Next, negotiations with Port Vila failed, and from 27 July to 18 August, British Royal Marines and a unit of the French Garde Mobile were deployed to Vanuatu's capital island, but they did not enter Espiritu Santo as the soon-to-be government had hoped. The troops were recalled shortly before independence. Following independence on 31 July 1980, Vanuatu, now governed by the Vanuaku Party with Father Walter Lini as Prime Minister of Vanuatu, requested assistance from Papua New Guinea, whose army suppressed the rebellion, keeping Espiritu Santo in Vanuatu.

== Geography ==
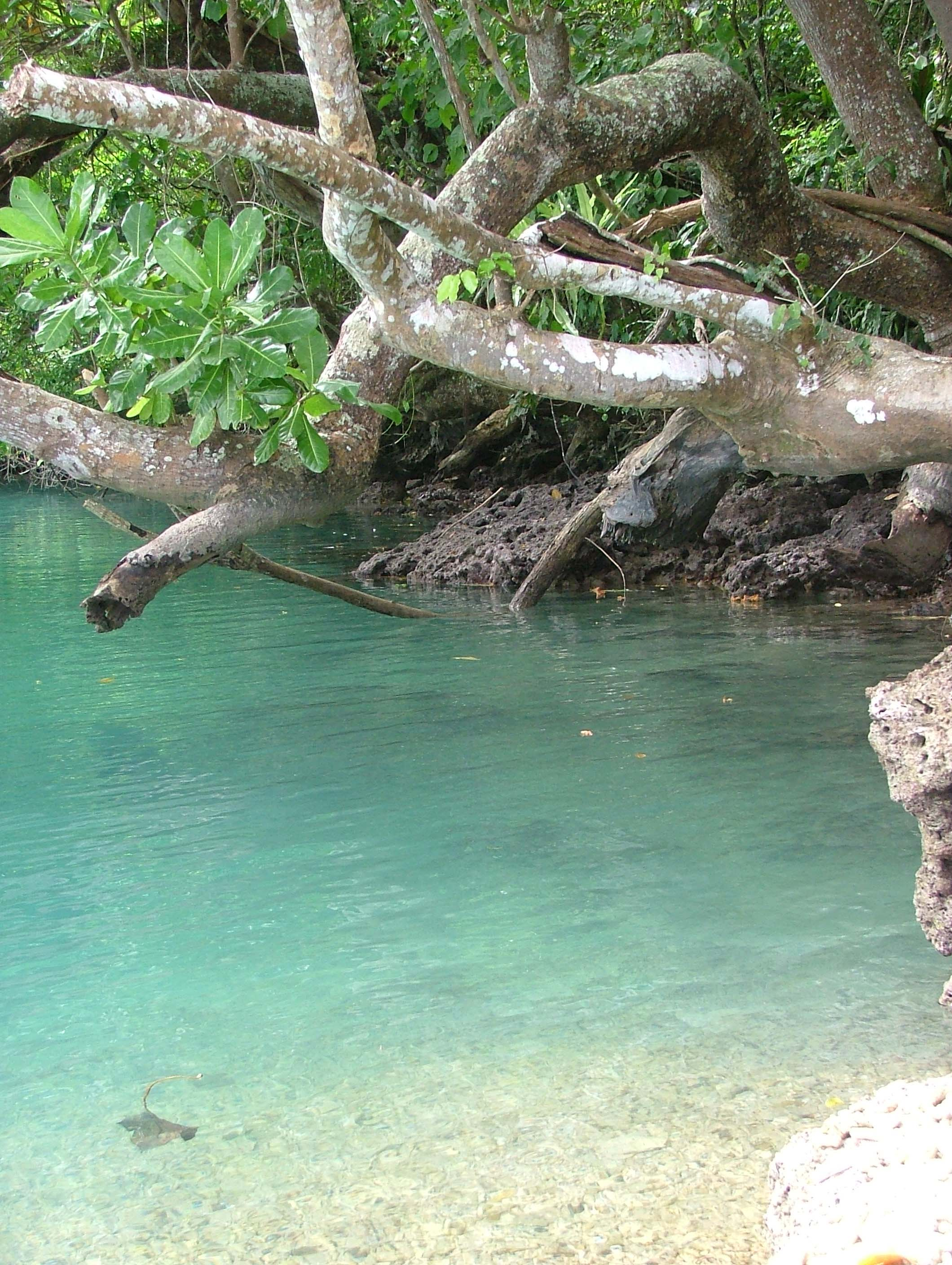
Best Point, South Santo

The island belongs to the archipelago of Vanuatu in the Pacific region of Melanesia. It is in the Sanma Province of Vanuatu. The town of Luganville, on Espiritu Santo's southeast coast, is Vanuatu's second-largest settlement and the provincial capital. Roads run north and west from Luganville, but most of the island is far from the limited road network.

=== Small islands off Santo ===
Around Espiritu Santo lie a number of small islands and islets. Among them are: Dany Island, Araki, Elephant Island, Sakao, Lataroa, Lataro, Thion, Malohu, Malwepe, Malvapevu, Malparavu, Maltinerava, Oyster Island, Tangoa, and Bokissa.

Vanuatu's highest peak is the 1,879-metre (6,165 ft) Mount Tabwemasana in west-central Espiritu Santo.

== Demographics ==
In the 2009 census, the population of Santo was around 40,000. In the 2020 census, the population of the Santo Rural Constituency represented 13 per cent of the national population of Vanuatu, with 37,328 individuals. (The island of Efate recorded 50,340 persons, representing 17 % of national population, in the same census.)

Most of the people are Christians. The largest church groups on the island are the Presbyterian Church of Vanuatu, the Roman Catholic Church, and the Church of Melanesia (Anglican). Also active are the Apostolic Church, the Church of Christ, the Seventh-day Adventist Church, and others. However, in many villages, particularly in Big Bay and South Santo, the people are "heathen", a term that in Vanuatu has no pejorative connotation — it simply denotes someone who has not embraced Christianity. Customary beliefs of a more modern sort are found among followers of the Nagriamel movement based in Fanafo.

== Culture ==
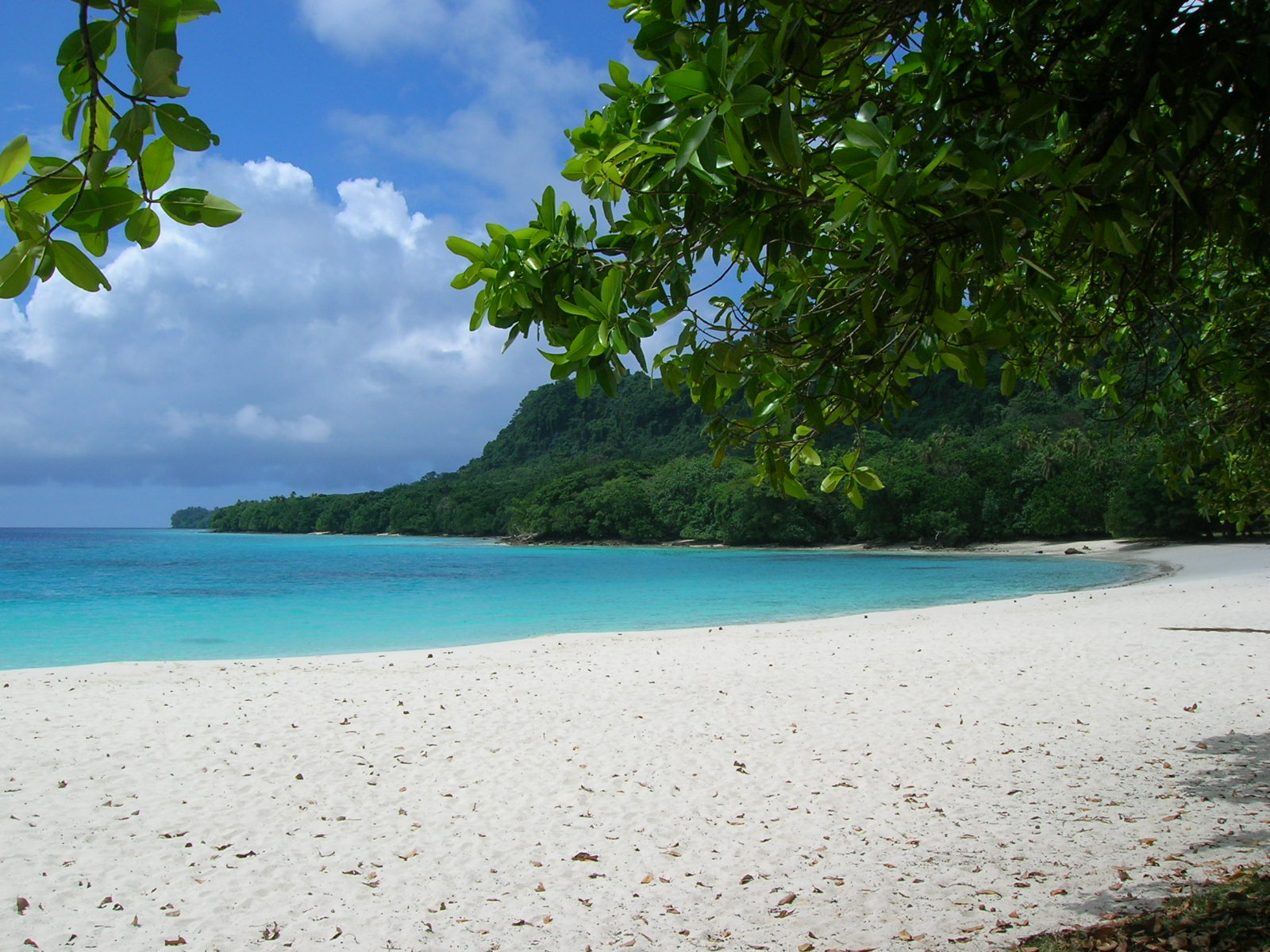
Champagne Beach, North Santo

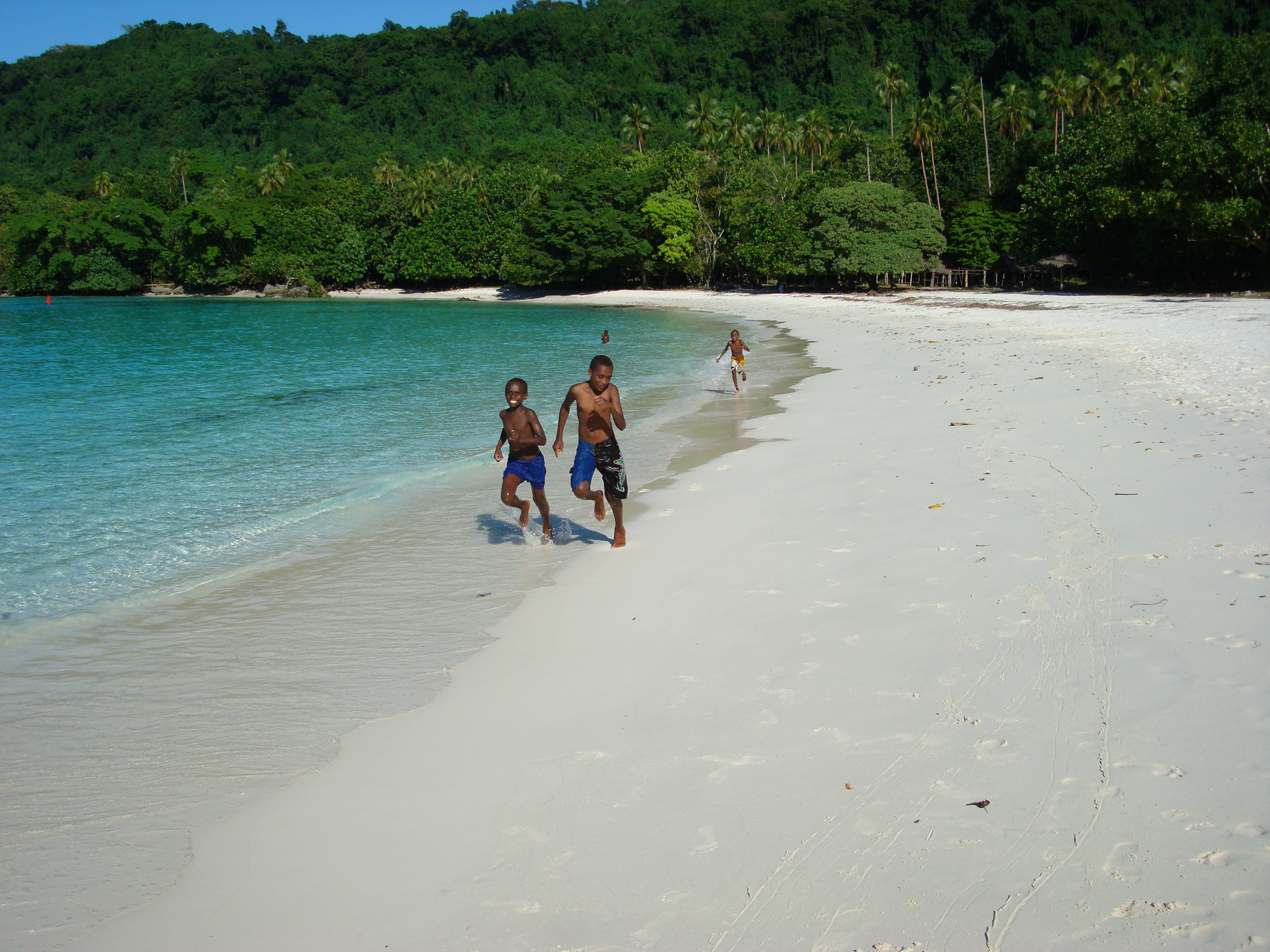
Local children

Over 30 different local languages are spoken on Espiritu Santo, a subgroup of the North Vanuatu languages.

Espiritu Santo, with many wrecks and reefs to be explored, is a very popular tourist destination for divers. Champagne Beach draws tourists with its white sand and clear waters. The "Western Side" of the island contains many caves which can be explored, and cruise ships often stop in at Luganville.

The local people make their living by supporting the tourist trade, by cash-crop farming, mostly copra, but also some cocoa beans and kava, as well as peanuts, or by subsistence farming and fishing.

For almost all of Espiritu Santo's people, custom plays a large part in their lives, regardless of their religion. The chief system continues strongly in most areas.

The people of Santo face some health problems, especially malaria and tuberculosis. Although there is a hospital, most local people consult either their own witch doctor or medical clinics set up by Western missionaries. Kava is the popular drug of the island, although alcohol is becoming more prevalent. With the rising number of adults using alcohol, there is a rising crime rate, especially involving violence toward women, and tribal warfare.

=== Sports ===
In September 1998, Espiritu Santo hosted the Melanesia Cup soccer tournament.

== Flora and fauna ==
The island of Espiritu Santo is home to many of Vanuatu's endemic birds, including the Santo mountain starling, an endangered species that is restricted entirely to Espiritu Santo. Two protected areas have been established to safeguard the island's biodiversity; the Loru Conservation Area on the east coast and the Vatthe Conservation area near Big Bay in the north.

The Loru Rainforest Protected Area is situated in the lowland rainforests of Espiritu Santo. Established in 1993 by Chief Caleb Ser, the 220-hectare (540-acre) reserve supports a rich variety of Vanuatu's bird, bat, and plant life, as well as a diverse range of marine species in the 2 km (1.2 mi) stretch of fringing reef.

The tree Metrosideros tabwemasanaensis is endemic to high mountain forests on Mount Tabwemasana.

== Economy and infrastructure ==
Luganville is the only true town on the island; the rest of the island is dotted with small villages. From Luganville, three "main roads" emerge. Main Street leaves the town to the west and winds along the south coast of the island for about 40 km (25 mi) ending at the village of Tasiriki on the southwest coast. Canal Road runs along the southern and eastern coasts of the island, north through Hog Harbor and Golden Beach, ending at Port Olry. Big Bay Highway splits off from Canal Road near Turtle Bay on the east coast, runs generally west to the mountains, and then it leads north to Big Bay. The international airport is about 5 km (3 mi) east of the center of Luganville. Numerous rivers run to the coastline from the mountains of the island. The Sarakata River is the largest one, and it runs through Luganville.

Many people on Espiritu Santo still rely on subsistence farming for their food. The villages on the island are mostly self-sufficient with their own vegetable gardens, chickens, and pigs. Taros and yams are commonly grown in these gardens, and these are mainstays of the local diet.

Espiritu Santo is home to a number of cattle farms (including the famous Belmol Cattle Project, originally established by French settlers), and the island exports much of its beef to Japan, Australia, and other Pacific countries.

Besides beef, tinned fish, and rice bought in town, Espiritu Santo has many foods that locals take for granted, and that tourists enjoy as delicacies. Among these are sweet pineapples, mangoes, island cabbage, flying foxes, and coconut crab, as well as local nuts such as natapoa and the sweet fleshy-fruit called naos in Bislama, or great hog plum in English (a type of Spondias dulcis). There is a market in Luganville where local food such as yams, sweet potatoes, manioc, taro, cabbage, and other freshly grown island staples are sold. Some local handicrafts are also sold there. Several small supermarkets such as LCM, Unity Shell, and Au bon Marché sell groceries and many packaged goods.

== See also ==
- Espiritu Santo languages
- Vanuatu Labor Corps
