= Sanma Province =

Province of Vanuatu

Coordinates: 15°20′S 166°45′E

Sanma
- Province
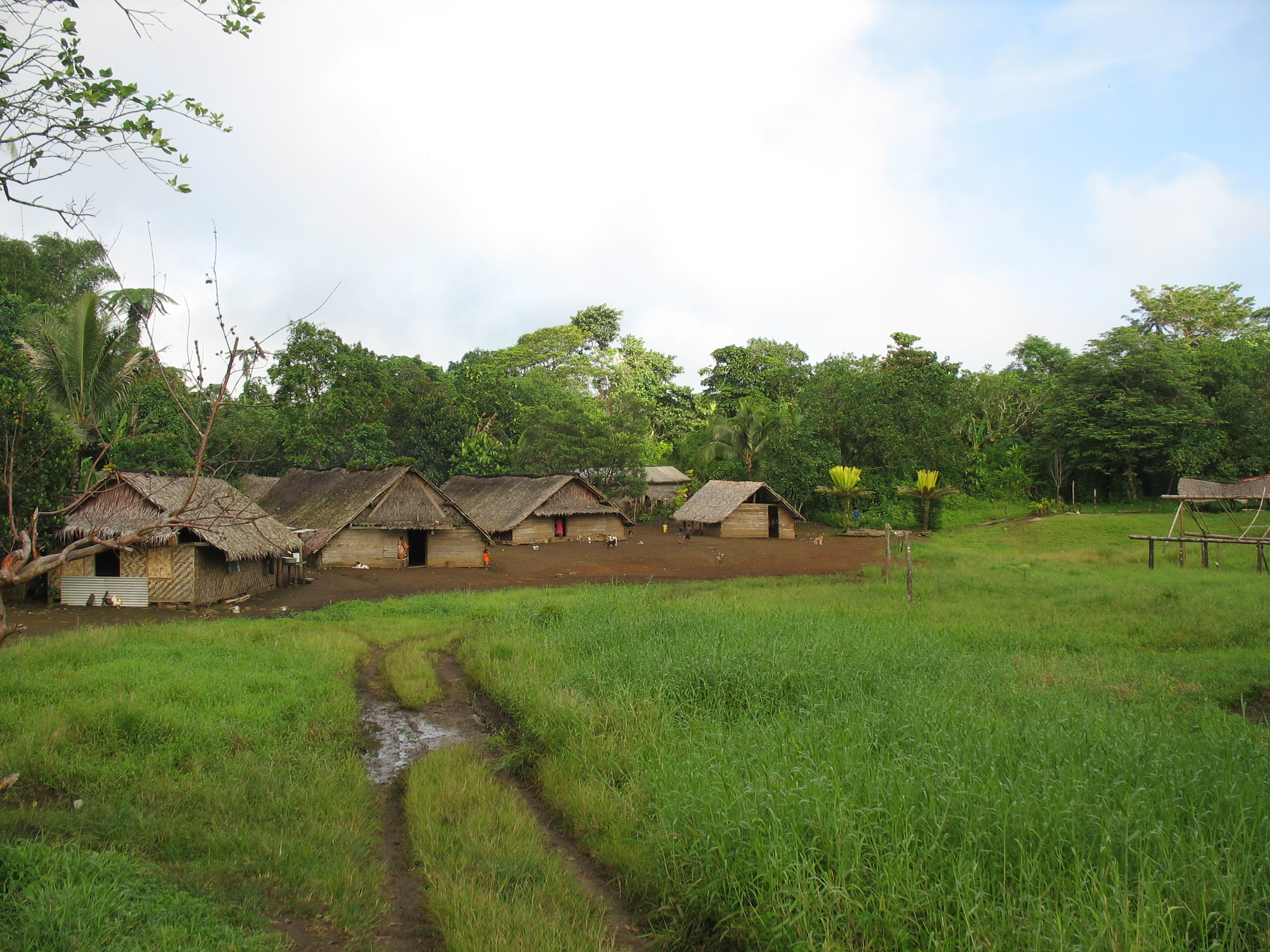

- Flag

- Sanma in Vanuatu
- Country: Vanuatu
- Capital: Luganville

Area
  - Total: 4,248 km^{2} (1,640 sq mi)

Population (2020)
  - Total: 61,458
  - Density: 14.47/km^{2} (37.47/sq mi)

Sanma is a province located in the Northern part of the nation of Vanuatu, occupying the nation's largest island, Espiritu Santo. The province spans an area of 4,248 square kilometres (1,640 sq mi) and has its capital in Luganville, Vanuatu's second-largest city. Named as a portmanteau of Santo and Malo, Sanma is geologically among the oldest parts of the archipelago and includes Mount Tabwemasana, the highest peak in the country. According to the national 2020 census, Sanma had a population of 61,458. The local economy is primarily based on subsistence agriculture and fishing, with cacao, copra, and kava as key cash crops.

== Administrative divisions ==
Sanma Province are subdivided into eleven area councils, which are further subdivided into populated places (i.e.: villages, communities, etc.).

- Big Bay Coast Area Council
- Big Bay Inland Area Council
- Canal Fanafo Area Council
- East Malo Area Council
- East Santo Area Council
- North West Santo Area Council
- South East Santo Area Council
- South Santo I Area Council
- South Santo II Area Council
- West Malo Area Council
- West Santo Area Council

== Geography ==
The territory of Sanma Province covers 4,248 square kilometres (1,640 sq mi), of which Espiritu Santo alone accounts for 4,010 square kilometres (1,550 sq mi). The province includes additional islands such as Tutuba, Araki, Bokissa, Mavia, Aese, Sakao, Lataro, Lataroa, and Thion.

The province is geologically among the oldest in Vanuatu, with formations dating from the Priabonian to the Middle Miocene. The highest point in both Sanma and Vanuatu is Mount Tabwemasana, located in western Espiritu Santo, which rises to 1,879 square kilometres (725 sq mi). The provincial capital is Luganville.

== Demographics ==
Historical population
Year	Pop.	±%
1967	12,785	—
1979	19,423	+51.9%
1989	25,542	+31.5%
1999	36,084	+41.3%
2009	45,855	+27.1%
2020	61,458	+34.0%

In the 2020 census, the province had a population of 61,458 inhabitants, comprising 31,536 males and 29,922 females, with a population density of 15 inhabitants per square kilometer and an annual growth rate of 2.7%.

== Economy ==
The economy of Sanma is largely based on subsistence agriculture, with communities cultivating yams, taro, and other root crops, as well as raising cattle, pigs, and chickens. Key cash crops include copra, cacao (for which Sanma is the leading exporter in Vanuatu), and kava. Fishing also provides income, especially on smaller islands.

Tourism is a growing sector, with Espiritu Santo known for its pristine beaches and diving attractions, including the SS President Coolidge wreck and Champagne Beach. Infrastructure improvements, such as upgrades to Luganville Harbour to accommodate cruise ships, have supported tourism growth. Handicraft sales have increased alongside tourist activity.

The informal economy plays a vital role, particularly in rural areas. Traditional agroforestry systems and women’s groups contribute to food security and economic resilience, especially in communities with limited access to formal markets.
