= Outline of Vanuatu =

Overview of and topical guide to Vanuatu

The Flag of Vanuatu

The Coat of arms of Vanuatu

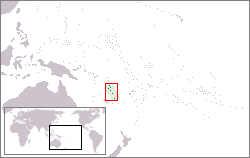
The location of Vanuatu

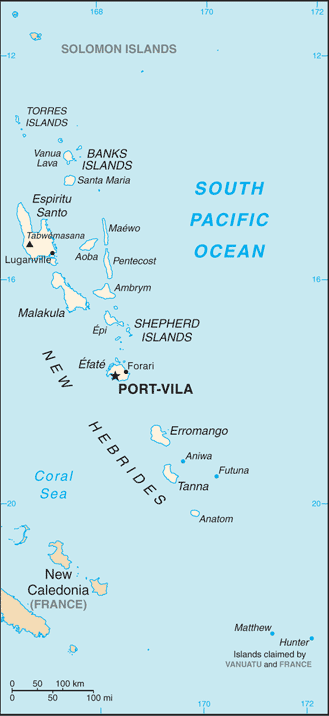
An enlargeable map of the Republic of Vanuatu

The following outline is provided as an overview of and topical guide to Vanuatu:

Vanuatu – sovereign island nation located in the South Pacific Ocean. The Vanuatu Archipelago is some 1,750 kilometres (1,087 mi) east of northern Australia, 500 km (310 mi) north-east of New Caledonia, west of Fiji, and south of the Solomon Islands. The archipelago is of volcanic origin. Vanuatu was first inhabited by Melanesian people. Europeans began to settle in the area in the late 18th century. In the 1880s France and the United Kingdom claimed parts of the country and in 1906 they agreed on a framework for jointly managing the archipelago through a British-French Condominium as the New Hebrides. An independence movement was established in the 1970s, and the Republic of Vanuatu was created in 1980.

== General reference ==
- Pronunciation:
- Common English country name: Vanuatu
- Official English country name: The Republic of Vanuatu
- Common endonym(s):
- Official endonym(s):
- Adjectival(s): Ni-Vanuatu, Vanuatuan
- Demonym(s):
- Etymology: Name of Vanuatu
- ISO country codes: VU, VUT, 548
- ISO region codes: See ISO 3166-2:VU
- Internet country code top-level domain: .vu

== Geography of Vanuatu ==
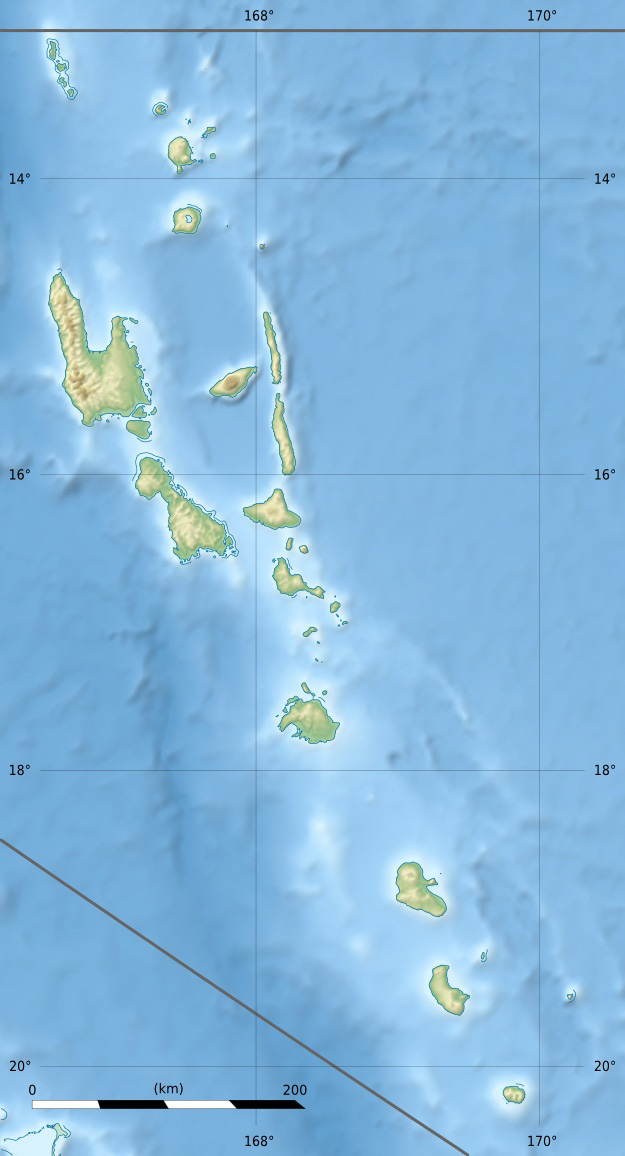
An enlargeable topographic map of Vanuatu

Geography of Vanuatu

- Vanuatu is: a country
- Location:
  - Southern Hemisphere and Eastern Hemisphere
  - Oceania
    - Melanesia
  - Time zone: UTC+11
  - Extreme points of Vanuatu
    - High: Mount Tabwemasana on Espiritu Santo 1,877 m (6,158 ft)
    - Low: South Pacific Ocean 0 m
  - Land boundaries: none
  - Coastline: South Pacific Ocean 2,528 km (1,571 mi)
- Population of Vanuatu: 301,000 - 173rd most populous country
- Area of Vanuatu: 12,189 km^{2} (4,706 sq mi)
- Atlas of Vanuatu

=== Environment of Vanuatu ===
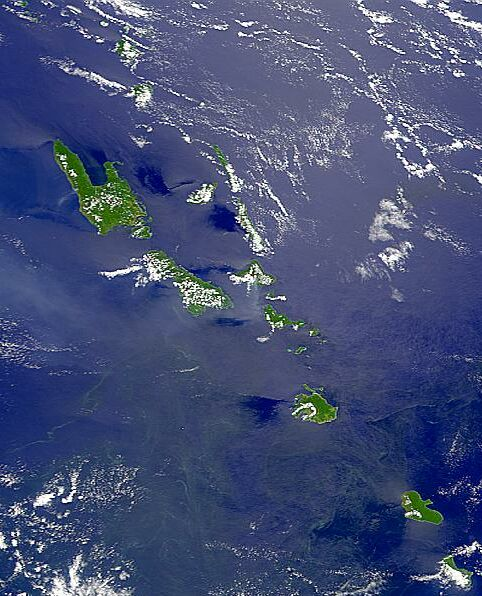
An enlargeable satellite image of Vanuatu

- Climate of Vanuatu
- Renewable energy in Vanuatu
- Geology of Vanuatu
- Protected areas of Vanuatu
  - Biosphere reserves in Vanuatu
  - National parks of Vanuatu
- Wildlife of Vanuatu
  - Fauna of Vanuatu
    - Birds of Vanuatu
    - Mammals of Vanuatu

==== Natural geographic features of Vanuatu ====
- Islands of Vanuatu
- Lakes of Vanuatu
- Mountains of Vanuatu
  - Volcanoes in Vanuatu
- Rivers of Vanuatu
  - Waterfalls of Vanuatu
- Valleys of Vanuatu
- World Heritage Sites in Vanuatu

List of ecoregions in Vanuatu

- Ecoregions in Vanuatu

==== Administrative divisions of Vanuatu ====
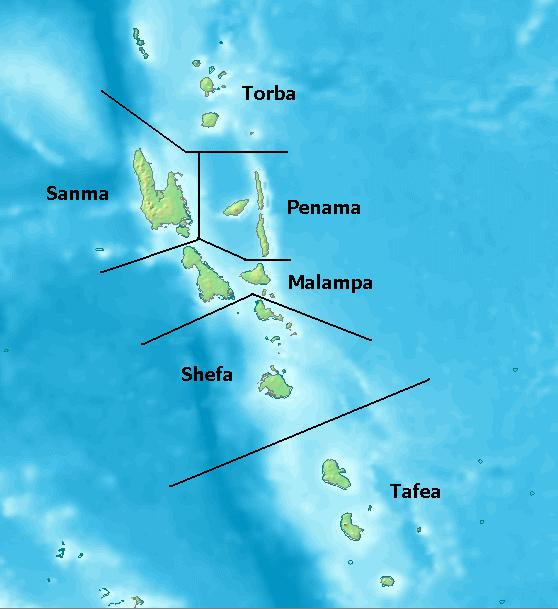
Provinces of Vanuatu

#	Province	Capital	Main islands
1	Malampa	Lakatoro	Ambrym, Malakula, Paama
2	Penama	Saratamata	Pentecost Island, Ambae, Maéwo
3	Sanma	Luganville	Santo, Malo
4	Shefa	Port Vila	Efate, Shepherd Islands, Epi
5	Tafea	Isangel	Tanna, Aniwa, Futuna, Erromango, Anatom
6	Torba	Sola	Banks and Torres Islands
	Vanuatu	Port Vila	

=== Demography of Vanuatu ===
Demographics of Vanuatu

== Government and politics of Vanuatu ==
Politics of Vanuatu

- Form of government: parliamentary representative democratic republic
- Capital of Vanuatu: Port Vila
- Elections in Vanuatu
- Political parties in Vanuatu

=== Branches of the government of Vanuatu ===
Government of Vanuatu

==== Executive branch of the government of Vanuatu ====
- Head of state: President of Vanuatu, Nikenike Vurobaravu
- Head of government: Prime Minister of Vanuatu, Jotham Napat
- Council of Ministers of Vanuatu
- Malvatu Mauri (National Council of Chiefs) - role is advisory only

==== Legislative branch of the government of Vanuatu ====
- Parliament of Vanuatu (unicameral)

==== Judicial branch of the government of Vanuatu ====
Court system of Vanuatu

- Court of Appeal of Vanuatu
  - Supreme Court of Vanuatu
    - Magistrates Court of Vanuatu
      - Island courts of Vanuatu

=== Foreign relations of Vanuatu ===
Foreign relations of Vanuatu

- Diplomatic missions in Vanuatu
- Diplomatic missions of Vanuatu

==== International organization membership ====
The Republic of Vanuatu is a member of:

- African, Caribbean, and Pacific Group of States (ACP)
- Asian Development Bank (ADB)
- Commonwealth of Nations
- Food and Agriculture Organization (FAO)
- Group of 77 (G77)
- International Bank for Reconstruction and Development (IBRD)
- International Civil Aviation Organization (ICAO)
- International Development Association (IDA)
- International Federation of Red Cross and Red Crescent Societies (IFRCS)
- International Finance Corporation (IFC)
- International Labour Organization (ILO)
- International Maritime Organization (IMO)
- International Monetary Fund (IMF)
- International Olympic Committee (IOC)
- International Red Cross and Red Crescent Movement (ICRM)
- International Telecommunication Union (ITU)
- International Trade Union Confederation (ITUC)
- Multilateral Investment Guarantee Agency (MIGA)
- Nonaligned Movement (NAM)
- Organisation internationale de la Francophonie (OIF)
- Organisation for the Prohibition of Chemical Weapons (OPCW)
- Organization of American States (OAS) (observer)
- The Pacific Community (SPC)
- Pacific Islands Forum (PIF)
- South Pacific Regional Trade and Economic Cooperation Agreement (Sparteca)
- United Nations (UN)
- United Nations Conference on Trade and Development (UNCTAD)
- United Nations Educational, Scientific, and Cultural Organization (UNESCO)
- United Nations Industrial Development Organization (UNIDO)
- Universal Postal Union (UPU)
- World Health Organization (WHO)
- World Meteorological Organization (WMO)
- World Trade Organization (WTO) (observer)

=== Law and order in Vanuatu ===
Law of Vanuatu

- Constitution of Vanuatu
- Crime in Vanuatu
- Human rights in Vanuatu
  - LGBT rights in Vanuatu
  - Women in Vanuatu
  - Freedom of religion in Vanuatu
- Law enforcement in Vanuatu

=== Military of Vanuatu ===
Military of Vanuatu Vanuatu has no military per se. The Vanuatu Mobile Force is a paramilitary force within the police force.

=== Local government in Vanuatu ===
Local government in Vanuatu

== History of Vanuatu ==
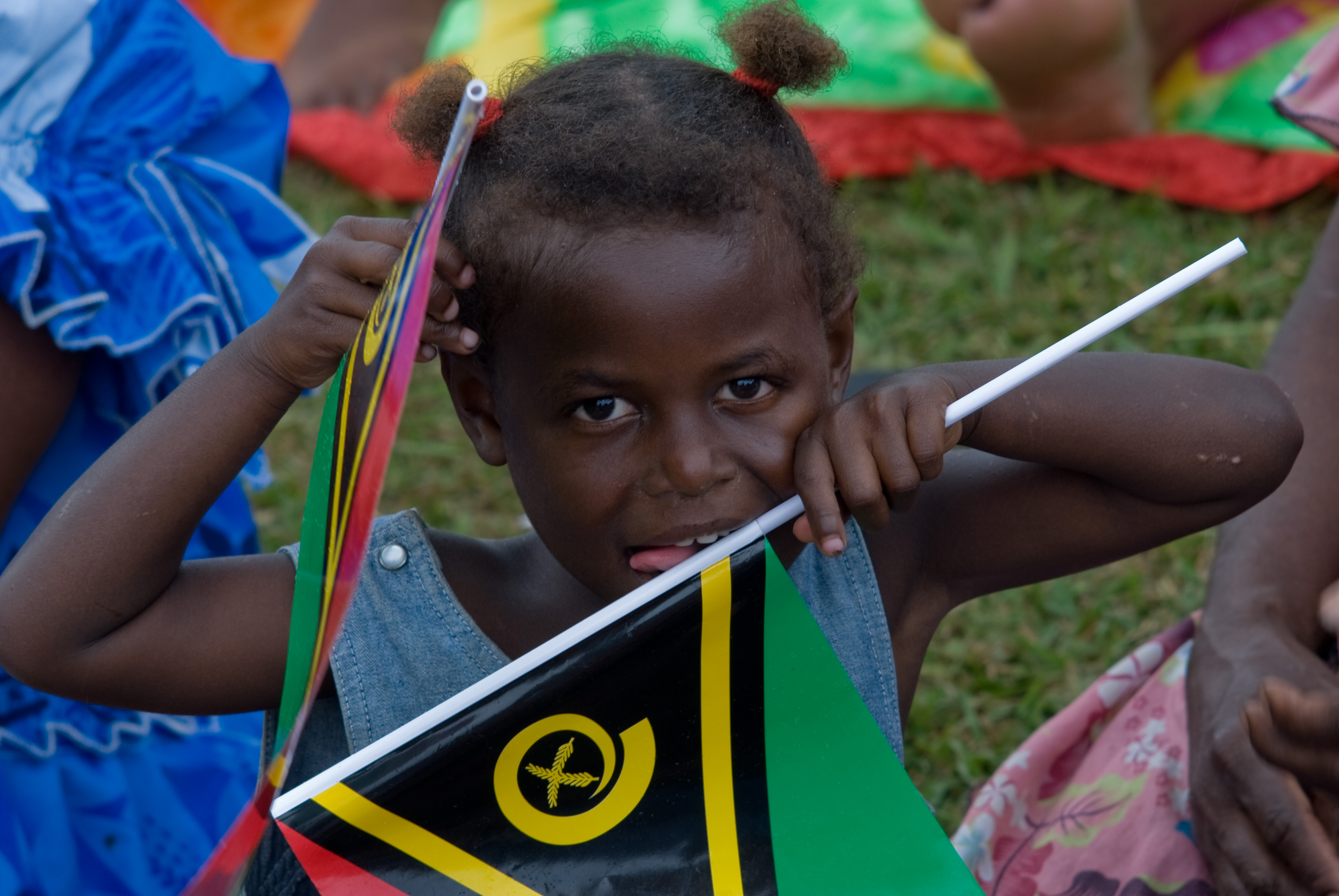
Vanuatu independence day, 2010

History of Vanuatu

- Timeline of the history of Vanuatu
- Current events of Vanuatu
- Military history of Vanuatu

== Culture of Vanuatu ==
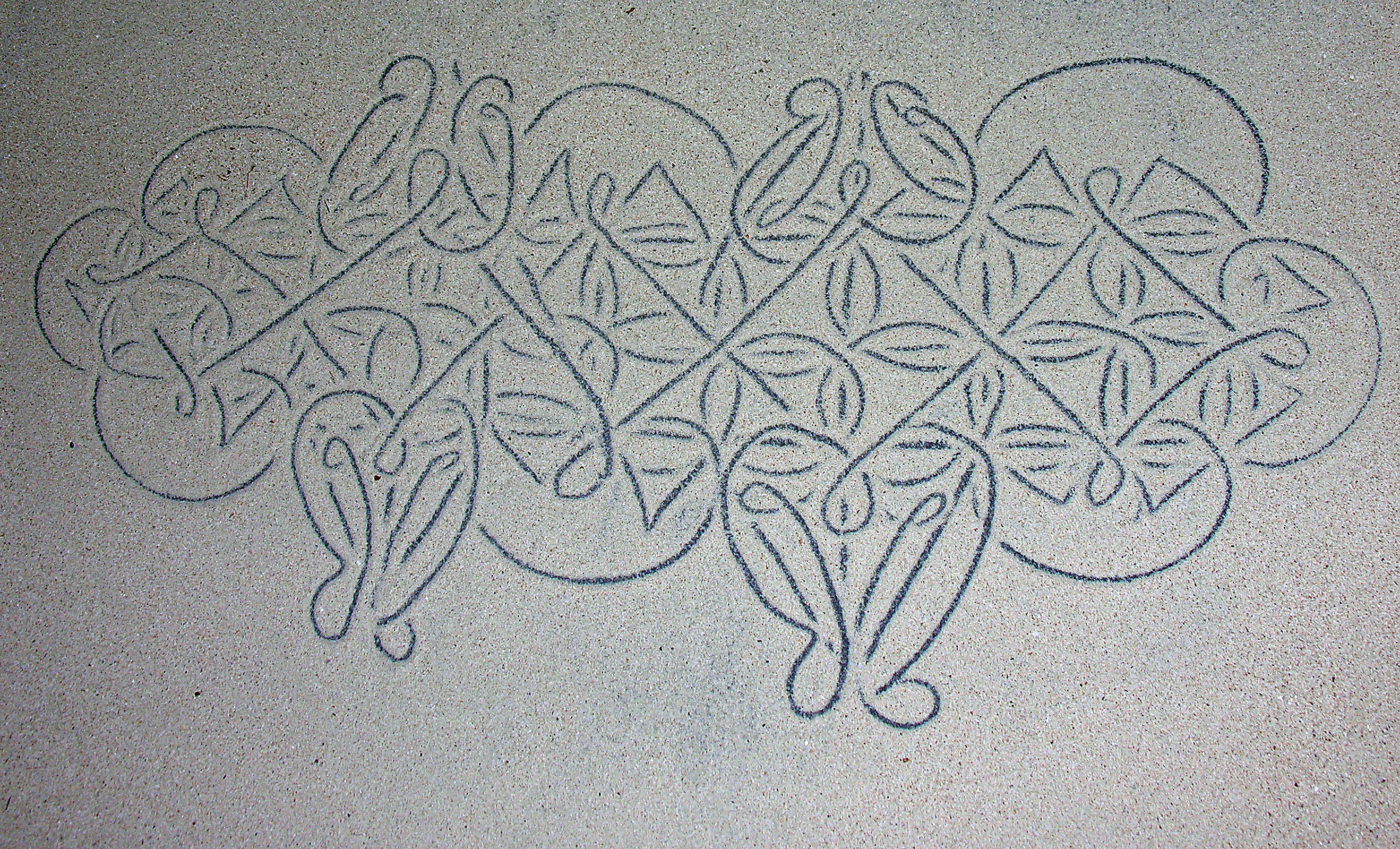
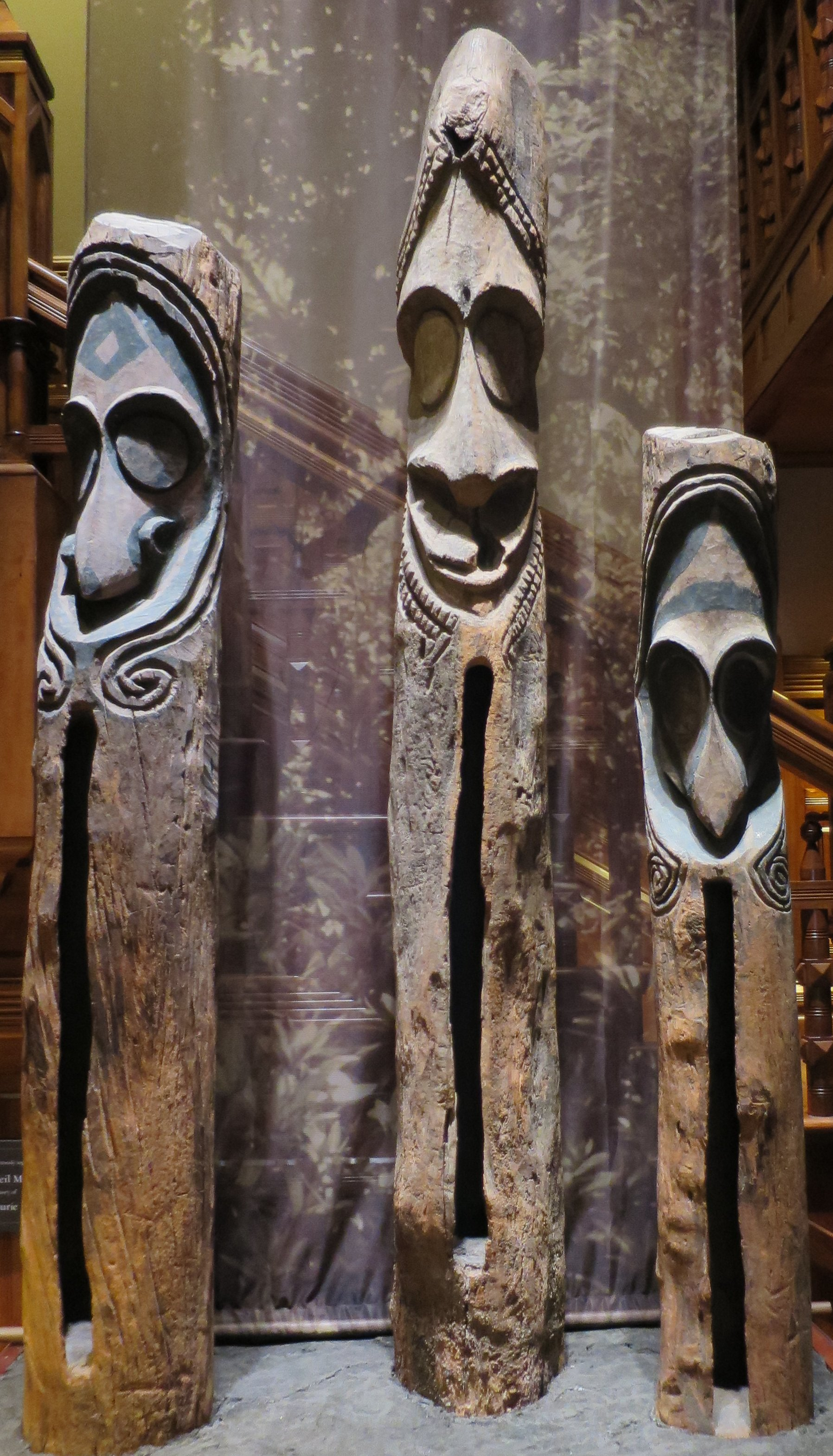
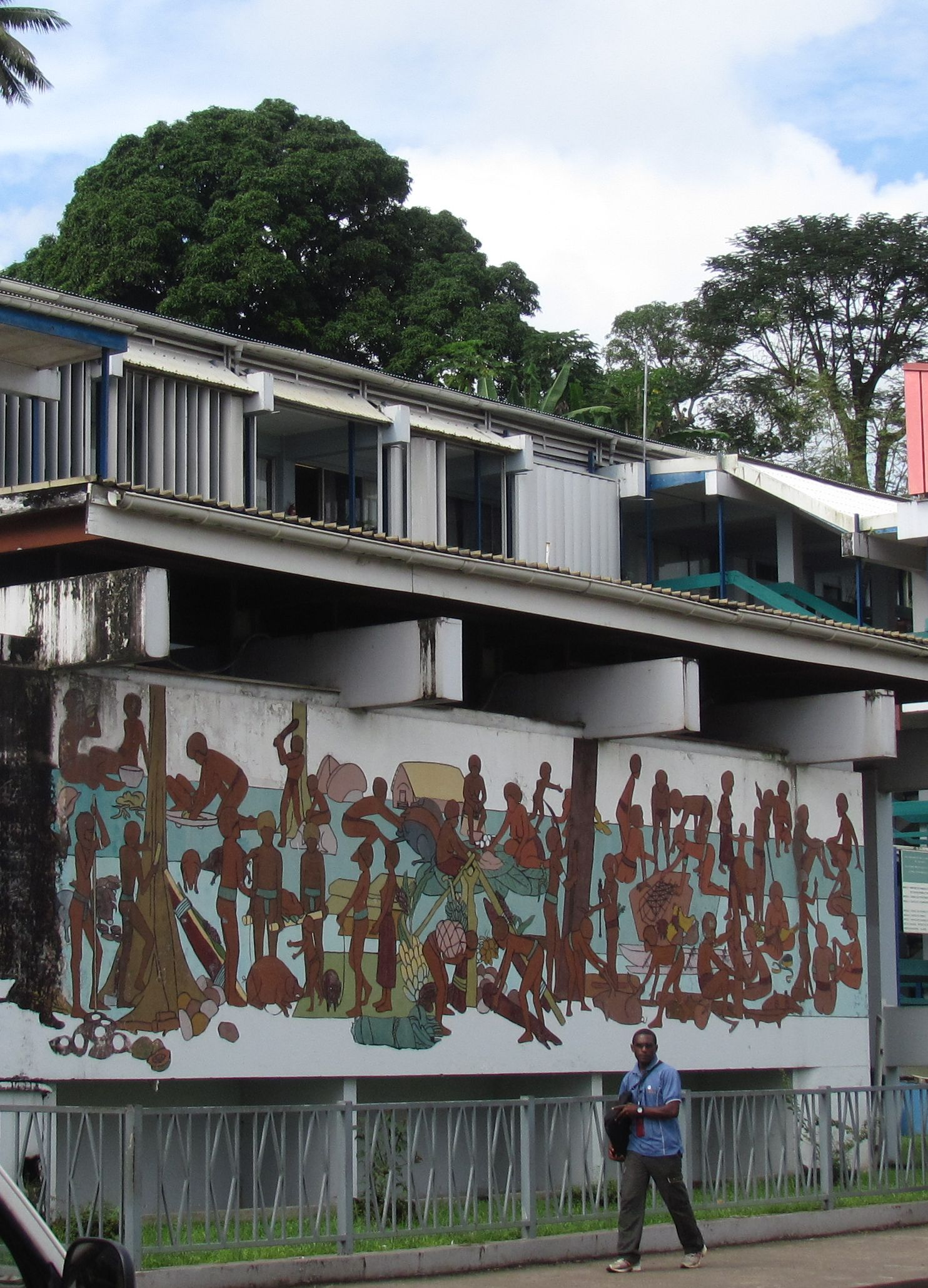
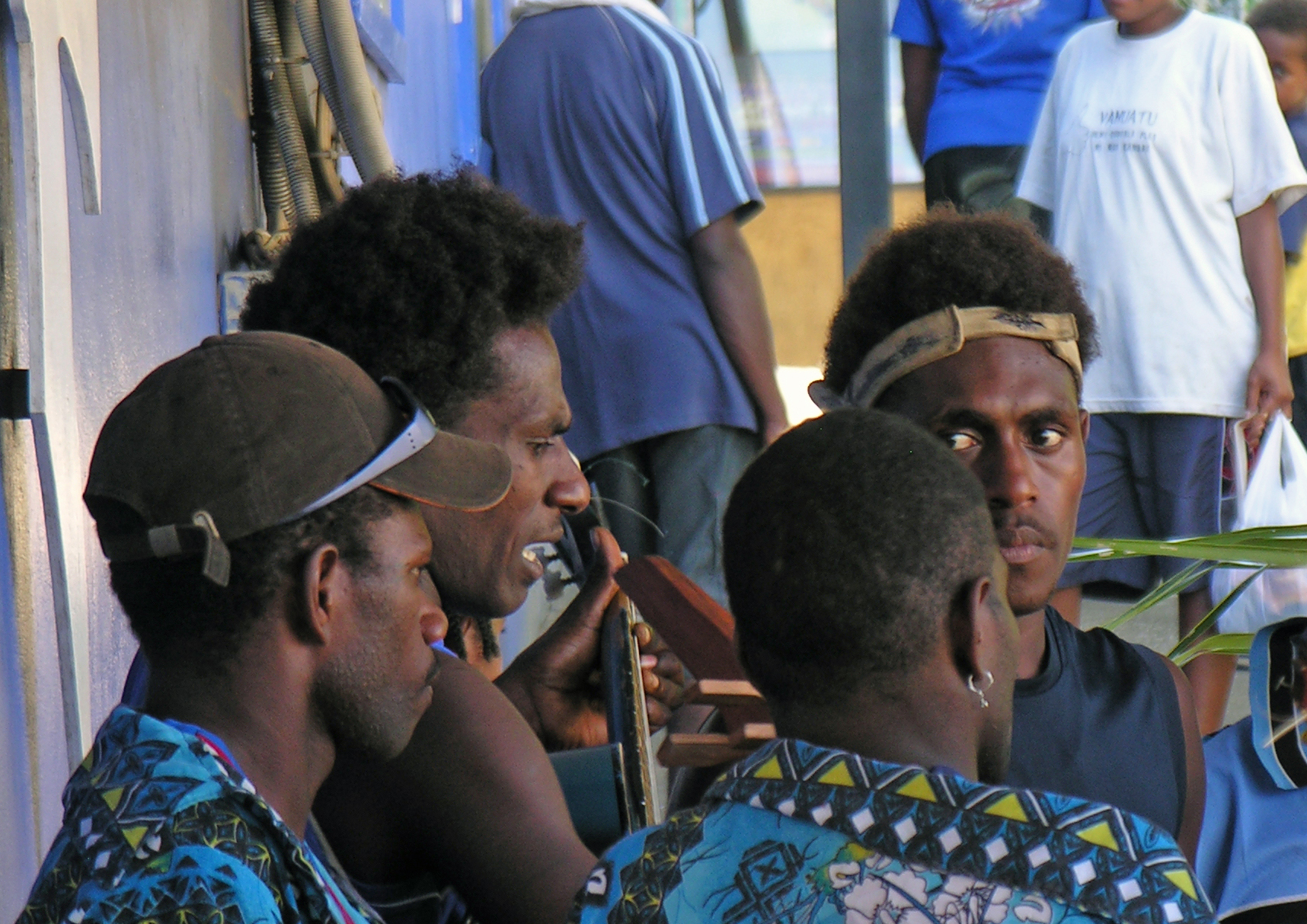
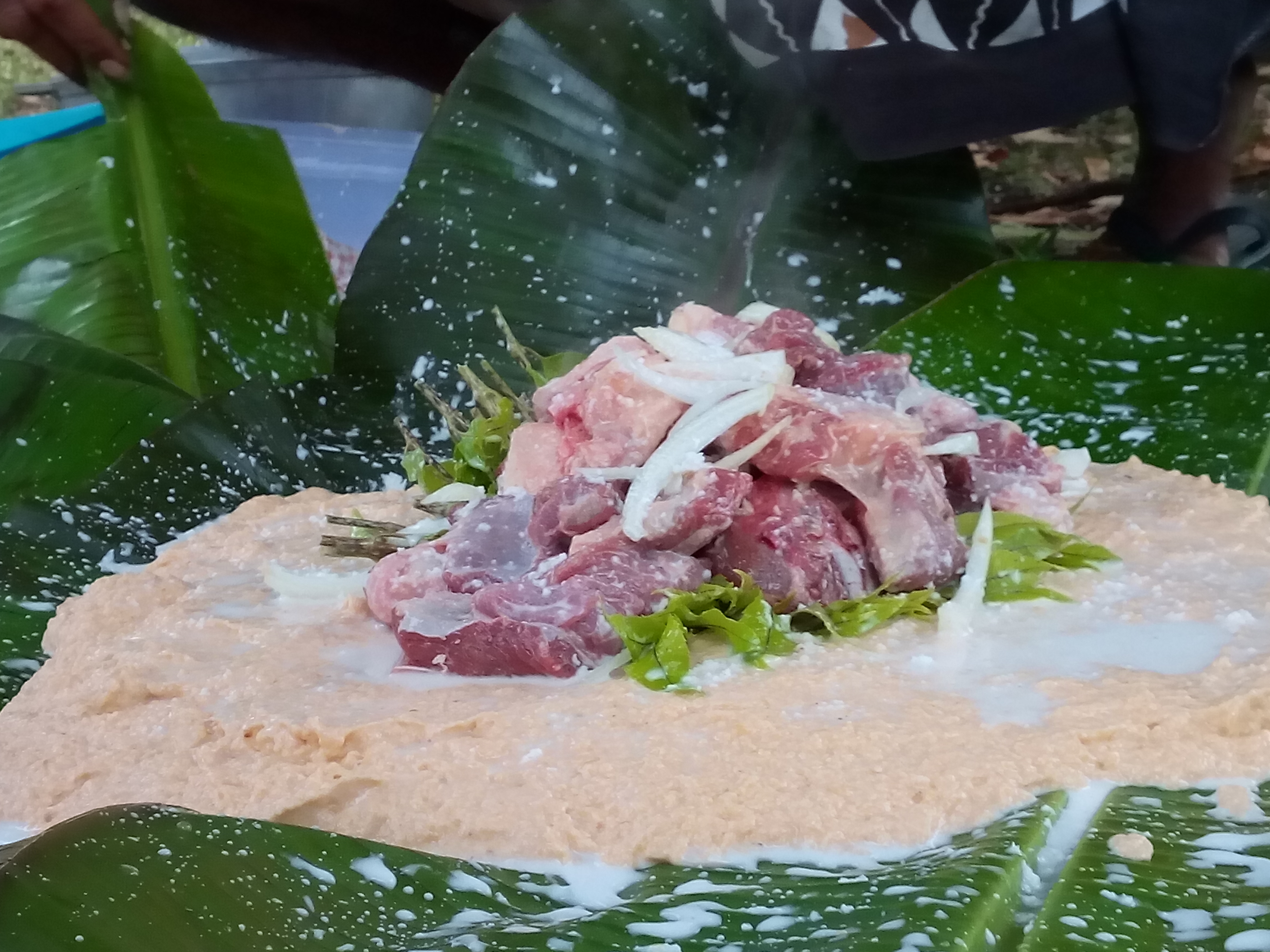
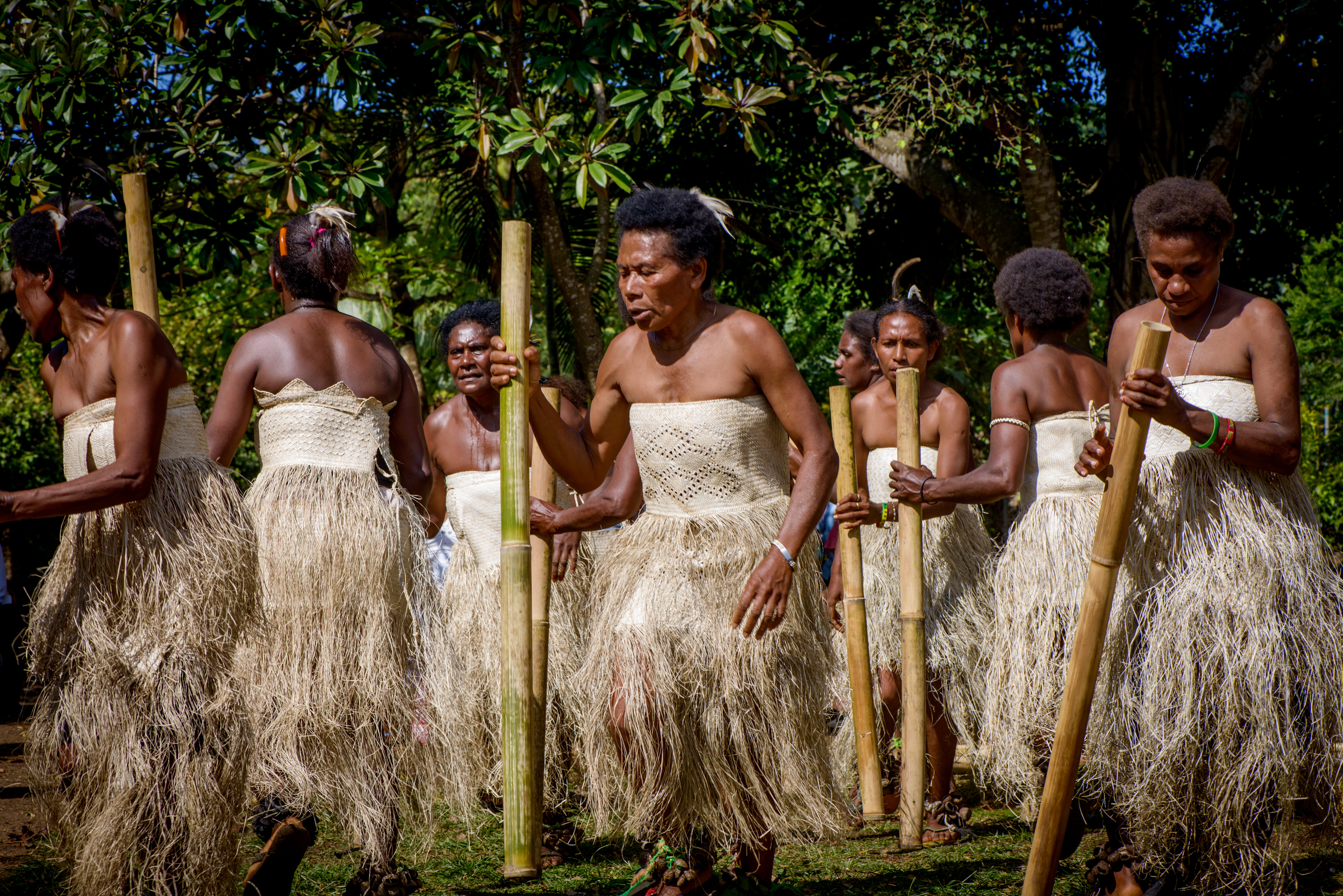

Culture of Vanuatu

- Architecture of Vanuatu
- Cuisine of Vanuatu
- Festivals in Vanuatu
- Languages of Vanuatu
  - Southern Oceanic languages
- Media in Vanuatu
- National symbols of Vanuatu
  - Coat of arms of Vanuatu
  - Flag of Vanuatu
  - National anthem of Vanuatu
- People of Vanuatu
- Public holidays in Vanuatu
- Records of Vanuatu
- Religion in Vanuatu
  - Christianity in Vanuatu
  - Hinduism in Vanuatu
  - Islam in Vanuatu
  - Judaism in Vanuatu
  - Sikhism in Vanuatu
- World Heritage Sites in Vanuatu

=== Art in Vanuatu ===
- Art in Vanuatu
- Cinema of Vanuatu
- Literature of Vanuatu
- Music of Vanuatu
- Television in Vanuatu
- Theatre in Vanuatu

=== Sports in Vanuatu ===
Sports in Vanuatu

- Football in Vanuatu
- Vanuatu at the Olympics

== Economy and infrastructure of Vanuatu ==
Economy of Vanuatu

- Economic rank, by nominal GDP (2007): 178th (one hundred and seventy eighth)
- Agriculture in Vanuatu
- Banking in Vanuatu
  - National Bank of Vanuatu
- Communications in Vanuatu
  - Internet in Vanuatu
- Companies of Vanuatu
- Currency of Vanuatu: Vatu
  - ISO 4217: VUV
- Energy in Vanuatu
  - Energy policy of Vanuatu
  - Oil industry in Vanuatu
- Mining in Vanuatu
- Tourism in Vanuatu
  - Visa policy of Vanuatu
- Transport in Vanuatu
- Vanuatu Stock Exchange

== Education in Vanuatu ==
Education in Vanuatu

== Infrastructure of Vanuatu ==
- Health care in Vanuatu
- Transportation in Vanuatu
  - Airports in Vanuatu
  - Rail transport in Vanuatu
  - Roads in Vanuatu
- Water supply and sanitation in Vanuatu

== See also ==
Vanuatu

- Index of Vanuatu-related articles
- List of international rankings
- List of Vanuatu-related topics
- Member state of the Commonwealth of Nations
- Member state of the United Nations
- Outline of geography
- Outline of Oceania
