= TVL =

TVL or tvl can refer to:

- TV Licensing, trade name used by BBC subcontractors operating in the UK
- Television lines, image resolution specification
- Tuvaluan language code
- Troy Van Leeuwen, known as TVL
  - Yamaha SA503 TVL guitar, named for Van Leeuwen
- Telecom Vanuatu Limited, see Telecommunications in Vanuatu#Telephone
- Lake Tahoe Airport, California, US, IATA code
- Enterprise Volleyball League, Taiwan
- Tenth value layer in radiation physics
- TV Land, an American television network
- TV Libertés, a French Web TV
- The Vampire Lestat, a novel
- Technical Vocational Livelihood, an alternative term for vocational education
- RAAF Base Townsville, IATA airport code "TSV"
