= List of birds of Vanuatu =

This is a list of the bird species recorded in Vanuatu. The avifauna of Vanuatu include a total of 189 species, of which nine are endemic, and 10 have been introduced by humans.

This list's taxonomic treatment (designation and sequence of orders, families and species) and nomenclature (common and scientific names) follow the conventions of The Clements Checklist of Birds of the World, 2022 edition. The family accounts at the beginning of each heading reflect this taxonomy, as do the species counts found in each family account. Introduced and accidental species are included in the total counts for Vanuatu.

The following tags have been used to highlight several categories. The commonly occurring native species do not fall into any of these categories.

- (A) Accidental - a species that rarely or accidentally occurs in Vanuatu
- (E) Endemic - a species endemic to Vanuatu
- (I) Introduced - a species introduced to Vanuatu as a consequence, direct or indirect, of human actions
- (Ex) Extinct - a species or subspecies that no longer exists.

== Ducks, geese, and waterfowl ==
Order: Anseriformes Family: Anatidae

Anatidae includes the ducks and most duck-like waterfowl, such as geese and swans. These birds are adapted to an aquatic existence with webbed feet, flattened bills, and feathers that are excellent at shedding water due to an oily coating.

- Wandering whistling-duck, Dendrocygna arcuata (A)
- Australian shoveler, Spatula rhynchotis (A)
- Pacific black duck, Anas superciliosa
- Mallard, Anas platyrhynchos (I)
- Northern pintail, Anas acuta (A)
- Gray teal, Anas gracilis
- Hardhead, Aythya australis

== Megapodes ==
Order: Galliformes Family: Megapodiidae

The Megapodiidae are stocky, medium-large chicken-like birds with small heads and large feet. Distinguishing feature is the large mound that is built by these birds for nesting. Most have brown or black colouring.

- Melanesian scrubfowl, Megapodius eremita
- Vanuatu scrubfowl, Megapodius layardi (E)

== Pheasants, grouse, and allies ==
Order: Galliformes Family: Phasianidae

The Phasianidae are a family of terrestrial birds which consists of quails, partridges, snowcocks, francolins, spurfowls, tragopans, monals, pheasants, peafowls and jungle fowls. In general, they are plump (although they vary in size) and have broad, relatively short wings.

- Red junglefowl, Gallus gallus (I)

== Grebes ==
Order: Podicipediformes Family: Podicipedidae

Grebes are small to medium-large freshwater diving birds. They have lobed toes and are excellent swimmers and divers. However, they have their feet placed far back on the body, making them quite ungainly on land.

- Australasian grebe, Tachybaptus novaehollandiae

== Pigeons and doves ==
Order: Columbiformes Family: Columbidae

Pigeons and doves are stout-bodied birds with short necks and short slender bills with a fleshy cere.

- Rock pigeon, Columba livia (I)
- Metallic pigeon, Columba vitiensis
- Mackinlay's cuckoo-dove, Macropygia mackinlayi
- Pacific emerald dove, Chalcophaps longirostris
- Santa Cruz ground dove, Alopecoenas sanctaecrucis
- Tanna ground dove, Alopecoenas ferrugineus (Ex)
- Tanna fruit-dove, Ptilinopus tannensis (E)
- Rose-crowned fruit-dove, Ptilinopus regina
- Red-bellied fruit-dove, Ptilinopus greyi
- Claret-breasted fruit-dove, Ptilinopus viridis
- Pacific imperial-pigeon, Ducula pacifica
- Baker's imperial-pigeon, Ducula bakeri (E)

== Cuckoos ==
Order: Cuculiformes Family: Cuculidae

The family Cuculidae includes cuckoos, roadrunners and anis. These birds are of variable size with slender bodies, long tails and strong legs. The Old World cuckoos are brood parasites.

- Long-tailed koel, Eudynamys taitensis
- Shining bronze-cuckoo, Chrysococcyx lucidus
- Fan-tailed cuckoo, Cacomantis flabelliformis

== Swifts ==
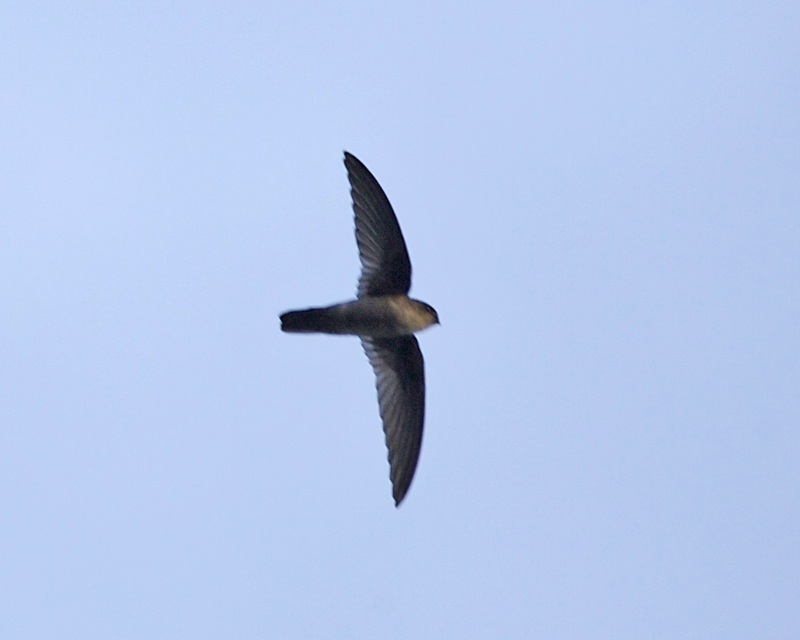
Uniform swiftlet

Order: Caprimulgiformes Family: Apodidae

Swifts are small birds which spend the majority of their lives flying. These birds have very short legs and never settle voluntarily on the ground, perching instead only on vertical surfaces. Many swifts have long swept-back wings which resemble a crescent or boomerang.

- Glossy swiftlet, Collocalia esculenta
- Satin swiftlet, Collocalia uropygialis
- White-rumped swiftlet, Aerodramus spodiopygius
- Australian swiftlet, Aerodramus terraereginae
- Uniform swiftlet, Aerodramus vanikorensis

== Rails, gallinules, and coots ==
Order: Gruiformes Family: Rallidae

Rallidae is a large family of small to medium-sized birds which includes the rails, crakes, coots and gallinules. Typically they inhabit dense vegetation in damp environments near lakes, swamps or rivers. In general they are shy and secretive birds, making them difficult to observe. Most species have strong legs and long toes which are well adapted to soft uneven surfaces. They tend to have short, rounded wings and to be weak fliers.

- Buff-banded rail, Gallirallus philippensis
- Black-backed swamphen, Porphyrio indicus
- Australasian swamphen, Porphyrio melanotus
- White-browed crake, Poliolimnas cinereus
- Spotless crake, Zapornia tabuensis
- Ocellated crake, Micropygia schomburgkii (A)

== Thick-knees ==
Order: Charadriiformes Family: Burhinidae

The thick-knees are a group of largely tropical waders in the family Burhinidae. They are found worldwide within the tropical zone, with some species also breeding in temperate Europe and Australia. They are medium to large waders with strong black or yellow-black bills, large yellow eyes and cryptic plumage. Despite being classed as waders, most species have a preference for arid or semi-arid habitats.

- Beach thick-knee, Esacus magnirostris

== Oystercatchers ==
Order: Charadriiformes Family: Haematopodidae

The oystercatchers are large and noisy plover-like birds, with strong bills used for smashing or prising open molluscs.

- South Island oystercatcher, Haematopus finschi (A)
- Variable oystercatcher, Haematopus unicolor (A)

== Plovers and lapwings ==
Order: Charadriiformes Family: Charadriidae

The family Charadriidae includes the plovers, dotterels and lapwings. They are small to medium-sized birds with compact bodies, short, thick necks and long, usually pointed, wings. They are found in open country worldwide, mostly in habitats near water.

- Black-bellied plover, Pluvialis squatarola (A)
- Pacific golden-plover, Pluvialis fulva
- Masked lapwing, Vanellus miles (A)
- Lesser sand-plover, Charadrius mongolus (A)
- Greater sand-plover, Charadrius leschenaultii
- Double-banded plover, Charadrius bicinctus (A)
- Oriental plover, Charadrius veredus (A)

== Sandpipers and allies ==
Order: Charadriiformes Family: Scolopacidae

Scolopacidae is a large diverse family of small to medium-sized shorebirds including the sandpipers, curlews, godwits, shanks, tattlers, woodcocks, snipes, dowitchers and phalaropes. The majority of these species eat small invertebrates picked out of the mud or soil. Variation in length of legs and bills enables multiple species to feed in the same habitat, particularly on the coast, without direct competition for food.

- Whimbrel, Numenius phaeopus
- Little curlew, Numenius minutus (A)
- Far Eastern curlew, Numenius madagascariensis
- Bar-tailed godwit, Limosa lapponica
- Black-tailed godwit, Limosa limosa (A)
- Ruddy turnstone, Arenaria interpres
- Sharp-tailed sandpiper, Calidris acuminata
- Curlew sandpiper, Calidris ferruginea (A)
- Red-necked stint, Calidris ruficollis (A)
- Sanderling, Calidris alba
- Pectoral sandpiper, Calidris melanotos (A)
- Common sandpiper, Actitis hypoleucos
- Gray-tailed tattler, Tringa brevipes
- Wandering tattler, Tringa incana
- Common greenshank, Tringa nebularia (A)
- Marsh sandpiper, Tringa stagnatilis (A)

== Skuas and jaegers ==
Order: Charadriiformes Family: Stercorariidae

The family Stercorariidae are, in general, medium to large birds, typically with grey or brown plumage, often with white markings on the wings. They nest on the ground in temperate and arctic regions and are long-distance migrants.

- Pomarine jaeger, Stercorarius pomarinus (A)
- Parasitic jaeger, Stercorarius parasiticus (A)
- Long-tailed jaeger, Stercorarius longicaudus (A)

== Gulls, terns, and skimmers ==
Order: Charadriiformes Family: Laridae

Laridae is a family of medium to large seabirds, the gulls, terns, and skimmers. Gulls are typically grey or white, often with black markings on the head or wings. They have stout, longish bills and webbed feet. Terns are a group of generally medium to large seabirds typically with grey or white plumage, often with black markings on the head. Most terns hunt fish by diving but some pick insects off the surface of fresh water. Terns are generally long-lived birds, with several species known to live in excess of 30 years.

- Silver gull, Chroicocephalus novaehollandiae (A)
- Brown noddy, Anous stolidus
- Black noddy, Anous minutus
- Gray noddy, Anous albivitta
- Blue-gray noddy, Anous ceruleus
- White tern, Gygis alba
- Sooty tern, Onychoprion fuscatus
- Gray-backed tern, Onychoprion lunatus (A)
- Bridled tern, Onychoprion anaethetus (A)
- Little tern, Sternula albifrons (A)
- Whiskered tern, Chlidonias hybrida (A)
- Roseate tern, Sterna dougallii (A)
- Black-naped tern, Sterna sumatrana
- Common tern, Sterna hirundo
- Great crested tern, Thalasseus bergii

== Tropicbirds ==
Order: Phaethontiformes Family: Phaethontidae

Tropicbirds are slender white birds of tropical oceans, with exceptionally long central tail feathers. Their heads and long wings have black markings.

- White-tailed tropicbird, Phaethon lepturus
- Red-tailed tropicbird, Phaethon rubricauda

== Albatrosses ==
Order: Procellariiformes Family: Diomedeidae

The albatrosses are among the largest of flying birds, and the great albatrosses from the genus Diomedea have the largest wingspans of any extant birds.

- Black-browed albatross, Thalassarche melanophris (A)
- Wandering albatross, Diomedea exulans (A)

== Southern storm-petrels ==
Order: Procellariiformes Family: Oceanitidae

The southern storm-petrels are relatives of the petrels and are the smallest seabirds. They feed on planktonic crustaceans and small fish picked from the surface, typically while hovering. The flight is fluttering and sometimes bat-like.

- Wilson's storm-petrel, Oceanites oceanicus (A)
- Black-bellied storm-petrel, Fregetta tropica (A)
- White-bellied storm-petrel, Fregetta grallaria (A)
- Polynesian storm-petrel, Nesofregetta fuliginosa

== Northern storm-petrels ==
Order: Procellariiformes Family: Hydrobatidae

Though the members of this family are similar in many respects to the southern storm-petrels, including their general appearance and habits, there are enough genetic differences to warrant their placement in a separate family.

- Leach's storm-petrel, Hydrobates leucorhous (A)
- Band-rumped storm-petrel, Hydrobates castro (A)

== Shearwaters and petrels ==
Order: Procellariiformes Family: Procellariidae

The procellariids are the main group of medium-sized "true petrels", characterised by united nostrils with medium septum and a long outer functional primary.

- Southern giant petrel, Macronectes giganteus (A)
- Cape petrel, Daption capense
- Kermadec petrel, Pterodroma neglecta (A)
- Herald petrel, Pterodroma heraldica (A)
- Providence petrel, Pterodroma solandri (A)
- Mottled petrel, Pterodroma inexpectata
- White-necked petrel, Pterodroma cervicalis
- Black-winged petrel, Pterodroma nigripennis (A)
- Cook's petrel, Pterodroma cookii (A)
- Gould's petrel, Pterodroma leucoptera
- Collared petrel, Pterodroma brevipes
- Pycroft's petrel, Pterodroma pycrofti (A)
- Vanuatu petrel, Pterodroma occulta
- Fairy prion, Pachyptila turtur
- Antarctic prion, Pachyptila desolata (A)
- Bulwer's petrel, Bulweria bulwerii (A)
- Tahiti petrel, Pseudobulweria rostrata (A)
- Beck's petrel, Pseudobulweria becki (A)
- Gray petrel, Procellaria cinerea
- Flesh-footed shearwater, Ardenna carneipes (A)
- Wedge-tailed shearwater, Ardenna pacifica
- Sooty shearwater, Ardenna grisea
- Short-tailed shearwater, Ardenna tenuirostris
- Christmas shearwater, Puffinus nativitatis (A)
- Fluttering shearwater, Puffinus gavia
- Tropical shearwater, Puffinus bailloni

== Frigatebirds ==
Order: Suliformes Family: Fregatidae

Frigatebirds are large seabirds usually found over tropical oceans. They are large, black and white or completely black, with long wings and deeply forked tails. The males have coloured inflatable throat pouches. They do not swim or walk and cannot take off from a flat surface. Having the largest wingspan-to-body-weight ratio of any bird, they are essentially aerial, able to stay aloft for more than a week.

- Lesser frigatebird, Fregata ariel
- Great frigatebird, Fregata minor (A)

== Boobies and gannets ==
Order: Suliformes Family: Sulidae

The sulids comprise the gannets and boobies. Both groups are medium to large coastal seabirds that plunge-dive for fish.

- Masked booby, Sula dactylatra (A)
- Brown booby, Sula leucogaster
- Red-footed booby, Sula sula

== Cormorants and shags ==
Order: Suliformes Family: Phalacrocoracidae

Phalacrocoracidae is a family of medium to large coastal, fish-eating seabirds that includes cormorants and shags. Plumage colouration varies, with the majority having mainly dark plumage, some species being black-and-white and a few being colourful.

- Little pied cormorant, Microcarbo melanoleucos
- Little black cormorant, Phalacrocorax sulcirostris (A)

== Pelicans ==
Order: Pelecaniformes Family: Pelecanidae

Pelicans are large water birds with a distinctive pouch under their beak. As with other members of the order Pelecaniformes, they have webbed feet with four toes.

- Australian pelican, Pelecanus conspicillatus (A)

== Herons, egrets, and bitterns ==
Order: Pelecaniformes Family: Ardeidae

The family Ardeidae contains the bitterns, herons, and egrets. Herons and egrets are medium to large wading birds with long necks and legs. Bitterns tend to be shorter necked and more wary. Members of Ardeidae fly with their necks retracted, unlike other long-necked birds such as storks, ibises and spoonbills.

- Great egret, Ardea alba (A)
- White-faced heron, Egretta novaehollandiae (A)
- Little egret, Egretta garzetta (A)
- Pacific reef-heron, Egretta sacra
- Striated heron, Butorides striata
- Nankeen night-heron, Nycticorax caledonicus (A)

== Hawks, eagles, and kites ==
Order: Accipitriformes Family: Accipitridae

Accipitridae is a family of birds of prey, which includes hawks, eagles, kites, harriers and Old World vultures. These birds have powerful hooked beaks for tearing flesh from their prey, strong legs, powerful talons and keen eyesight.

- Swamp harrier, Circus approximans
- Brown goshawk, Accipiter fasciatus
- Brahminy kite, Haliastur indus (A)

== Barn-owls ==
Order: Strigiformes Family: Tytonidae

Barn-owls are medium to large owls with large heads and characteristic heart-shaped faces. They have long strong legs with powerful talons.

- Eastern barn owl, Tyto javanica

== Kingfishers ==
Order: Coraciiformes Family: Alcedinidae

Kingfishers are medium-sized birds with large heads, long pointed bills, short legs and stubby tails.

- Vanuatu kingfisher, Todirhamphus farquhari (E)
- Pacific kingfisher, Todirhamphus sacer
- Sacred kingfisher, Todirhamphus sanctus
- Collared kingfisher, Todirhamphus chloris

== Falcons and caracaras ==
Order: Falconiformes Family: Falconidae

Falconidae is a family of diurnal birds of prey. They differ from hawks, eagles and kites in that they kill with their beaks instead of their talons.

- Peregrine falcon, Falco peregrinus

== Old World parrots ==
Order: Psittaciformes Family: Psittaculidae

Characteristic features of parrots include a strong curved bill, an upright stance, strong legs, and clawed zygodactyl feet. Many parrots are vividly coloured, and some are multi-coloured. In size they range from 8 cm (3.1 in) to 1 m (3.3 ft) in length. Old World parrots are found from Africa east across south and southeast Asia and Oceania to Australia and New Zealand.

- Oceanic parrot, Eclectus infectus (Ex)
- Large fig-parrot, Psittaculirostris desmarestii (A)
- Palm lorikeet, Vini palmarum
- Coconut lorikeet, Trichoglossus haematodus
- Rainbow lorikeet, Trichoglossus moluccanus

== Honeyeaters ==
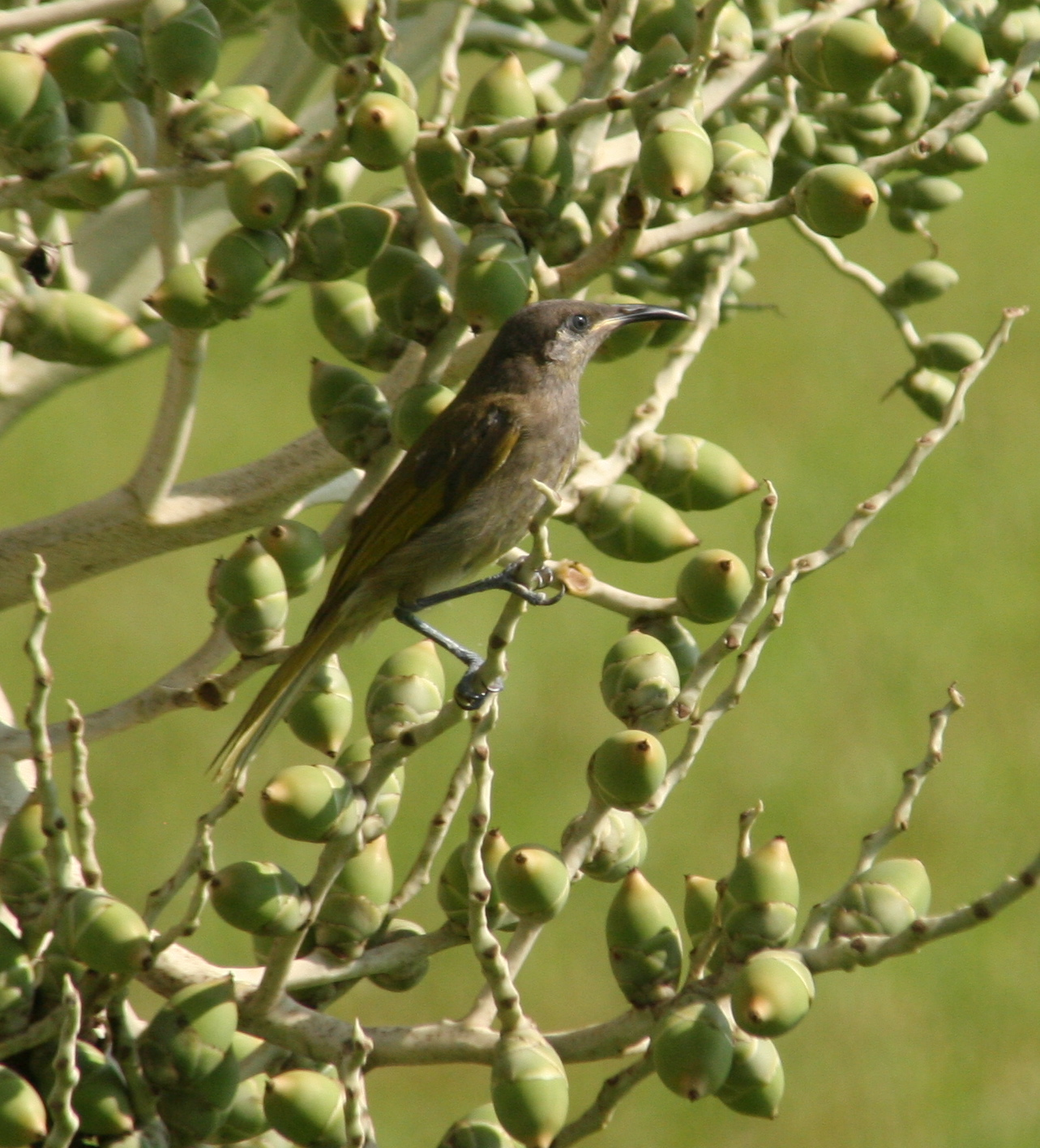
Dark-brown honeyeater

Order: Passeriformes Family: Meliphagidae

The honeyeaters are a large and diverse family of small to medium-sized birds most common in Australia and New Guinea. They are nectar feeders and closely resemble other nectar-feeding passerines.

- Cardinal myzomela, Myzomela cardinalis
- Vanuatu honeyeater, Phylidonyris notabilis (E)
- Dark-brown honeyeater, Lichmera incana

== Thornbills and allies ==
Order: Passeriformes Family: Acanthizidae

Thornbills are small passerine birds, similar in habits to the tits.

- Fan-tailed gerygone, Gerygone flavolateralis

== Cuckooshrikes ==
Order: Passeriformes Family: Campephagidae

The cuckooshrikes are small to medium-sized passerine birds. They are predominantly greyish with white and black, although some species are brightly coloured.

- South Melanesian cuckooshrike, Coracina caledonica
- Polynesian triller, Lalage maculosa
- Long-tailed triller, Lalage leucopyga

== Whistlers and allies ==
Order: Passeriformes Family: Pachycephalidae

The family Pachycephalidae includes the whistlers, shrikethrushes, and some of the pitohuis.

- Vanuatu whistler, Pachycephala chlorura
- Fiji whistler, Pachycephala vitiensis
- New Caledonian whistler, Pachycephala caledonica

== Woodswallows, bellmagpies, and allies ==
Order: Passeriformes Family: Artamidae

The woodswallows are soft-plumaged, somber-coloured passerine birds. They are smooth, agile flyers with moderately large, semi-triangular wings.

- White-breasted woodswallow, Artamus leucorynchus

== Fantails ==
Order: Passeriformes Family: Rhipiduridae

The fantails are small insectivorous birds which are specialist aerial feeders.

- Rufous fantail, Rhipidura rufifrons
- Streaked fantail, Rhipidura verreauxi
- Gray fantail, Rhipidura albiscapa
- New Zealand fantail, Rhipidura fuliginosa

== Monarch flycatchers ==
Order: Passeriformes Family: Monarchidae

The monarch flycatchers are small to medium-sized insectivorous passerines which hunt by flycatching.

- Buff-bellied monarch, Neolalage banksiana (E)
- Southern shrikebill, Clytorhynchus pachycephaloides
- Melanesian flycatcher, Myiagra caledonica

== Australasian robins ==
Order: Passeriformes Family: Petroicidae

Most species of Petroicidae have a stocky build with a large rounded head, a short straight bill and rounded wingtips. They occupy a wide range of wooded habitats, from subalpine to tropical rainforest, and mangrove swamp to semi-arid scrubland. All are primarily insectivores, although a few supplement their diet with seeds.

- Pacific robin, Petroica pusilla

== Grassbirds and allies ==
Order: Passeriformes Family: Locustellidae

The family Locustellidae is a group of small insectivorous passerine birds. Most are of generally undistinguished appearance, but many have distinctive songs.

- Guadalcanal thicketbird, Megalurulus whitneyi

== Swallows ==
Order: Passeriformes Family: Hirundinidae

The family Hirundinidae is adapted to aerial feeding. They have a slender streamlined body, long pointed wings and a short bill with a wide gape. The feet are adapted to perching rather than walking, and the front toes are partially joined at the base.

- Pacific swallow, Hirundo tahitica
- Tree martin, Petrochelidon nigricans (A)

== Bulbuls ==
Order: Passeriformes Family: Pycnonotidae

Bulbuls are medium-sized songbirds. Some are colourful with yellow, red or orange vents, cheeks, throats or supercilia, but most are drab, with uniform olive-brown to black plumage. Some species have distinct crests.

- Red-vented bulbul, Pycnonotus cafer (A)

== White-eyes, yuhinas, and allies ==
Order: Passeriformes Family: Zosteropidae

The white-eyes are small and mostly undistinguished, their plumage above being generally some dull colour like greenish-olive, but some species have a white or bright yellow throat, breast or lower parts, and several have buff flanks. As their name suggests, many species have a white ring around each eye.

- Silver-eye, Zosterops lateralis
- Yellow-fronted white-eye, Zosterops flavifrons (E)

== Starlings ==
Order: Passeriformes Family: Sturnidae

Starlings are small to medium-sized passerine birds. Their flight is strong and direct and they are very gregarious. Their preferred habitat is fairly open country. They eat insects and fruit. Plumage is typically dark with a metallic sheen.

- Rusty-winged starling, Aplonis zelandica
- Mountain starling, Aplonis santovestris (E)
- European starling, Sturnus vulgaris (A)
- Common myna, Acridotheres tristis (I)
- Jungle myna, Acridotheres fuscus (A)

== Thrushes and allies ==
Order: Passeriformes Family: Turdidae

The thrushes are a group of passerine birds that occur mainly in the Old World. They are plump, soft plumaged, small to medium-sized insectivores or sometimes omnivores, often feeding on the ground. Many have attractive songs.

- Song thrush, Turdus philomelos (A)
- White-headed island-thrush, Turdus pritzbueri
- Vanikoro island-thrush, Turdus vanikorensis

== Waxbills and allies ==
Order: Passeriformes Family: Estrildidae

The estrildid finches are small passerine birds of the Old World tropics and Australasia. They are gregarious and often colonial seed eaters with short thick but pointed bills. They are all similar in structure and habits, but have wide variation in plumage colours and patterns.

- Common waxbill, Estrilda astrild (I)
- Red avadavat, Amandava amandava (A)
- Red-browed firetail, Neochmia temporalis (I)
- Blue-faced parrotfinch, Erythrura trichroa
- Red-throated parrotfinch, Erythrura psittacea (I)
- Red-headed parrotfinch, Erythrura cyaneovirens
- Chestnut munia, Lonchura atricapilla (I)
- Chestnut-breasted munia, Lonchura castaneothorax (I)

== Old World sparrows ==
Order: Passeriformes Family: Passeridae

Old World sparrows are small passerine birds. In general, sparrows tend to be small, plump, brown or grey birds with short tails and short powerful beaks. Sparrows are seed eaters, but they also consume small insects.

- House sparrow, Passer domesticus (I)
- Eurasian tree sparrow, Passer montanus (I)

== Finches, euphonias, and allies ==
Order: Passeriformes Family: Fringillidae

Finches are seed-eating passerine birds, that are small to moderately large and have a strong beak, usually conical and in some species very large. All have twelve tail feathers and nine primaries. These birds have a bouncing flight with alternating bouts of flapping and gliding on closed wings, and most sing well.

- Common redpoll, Acanthis flammea (A)
- Lesser redpoll, Acanthis cabaret (A)

== See also ==
- List of birds
- Lists of birds by region
