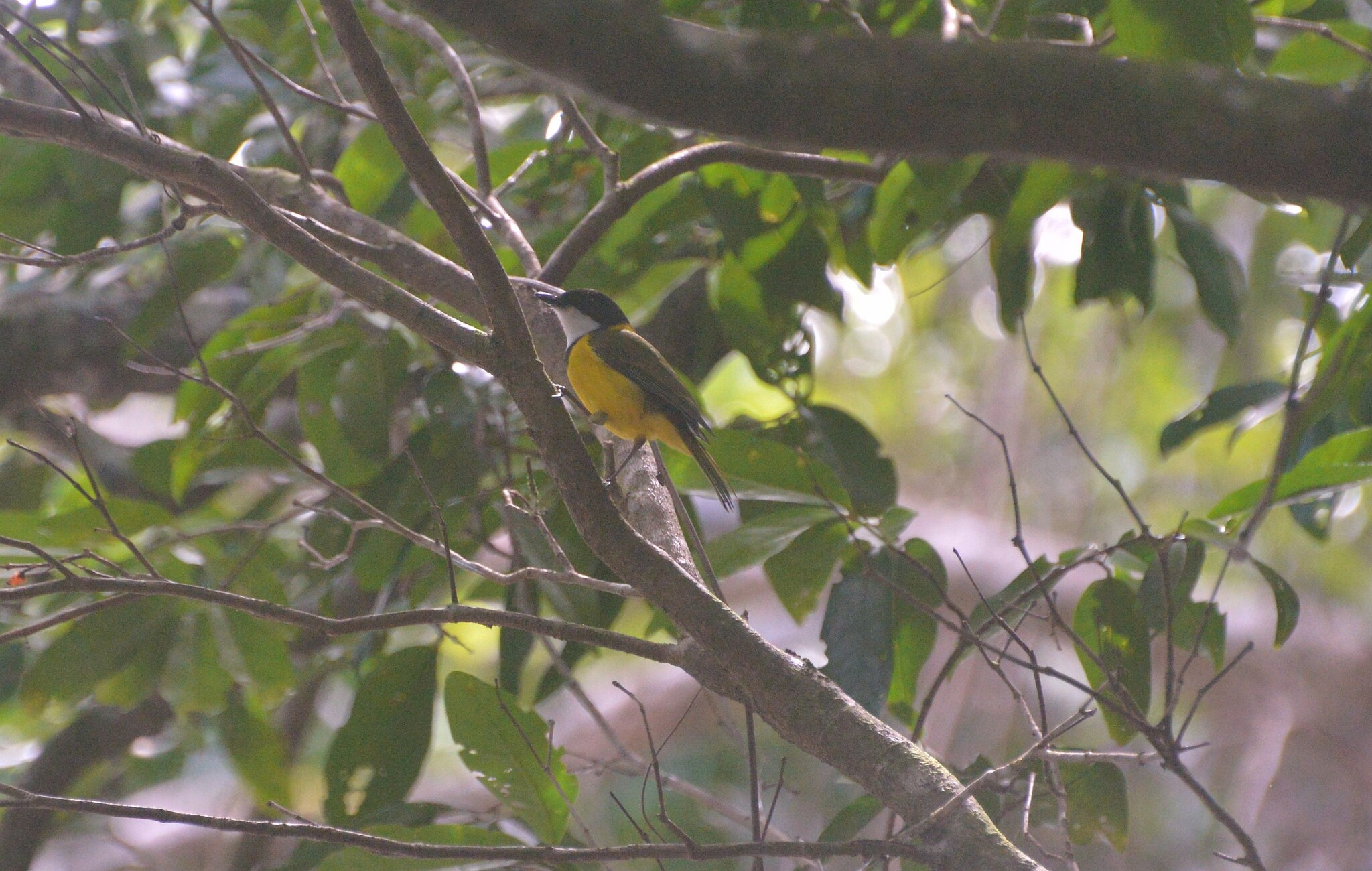
- Male (above) and female (below) of subspecies cucullata
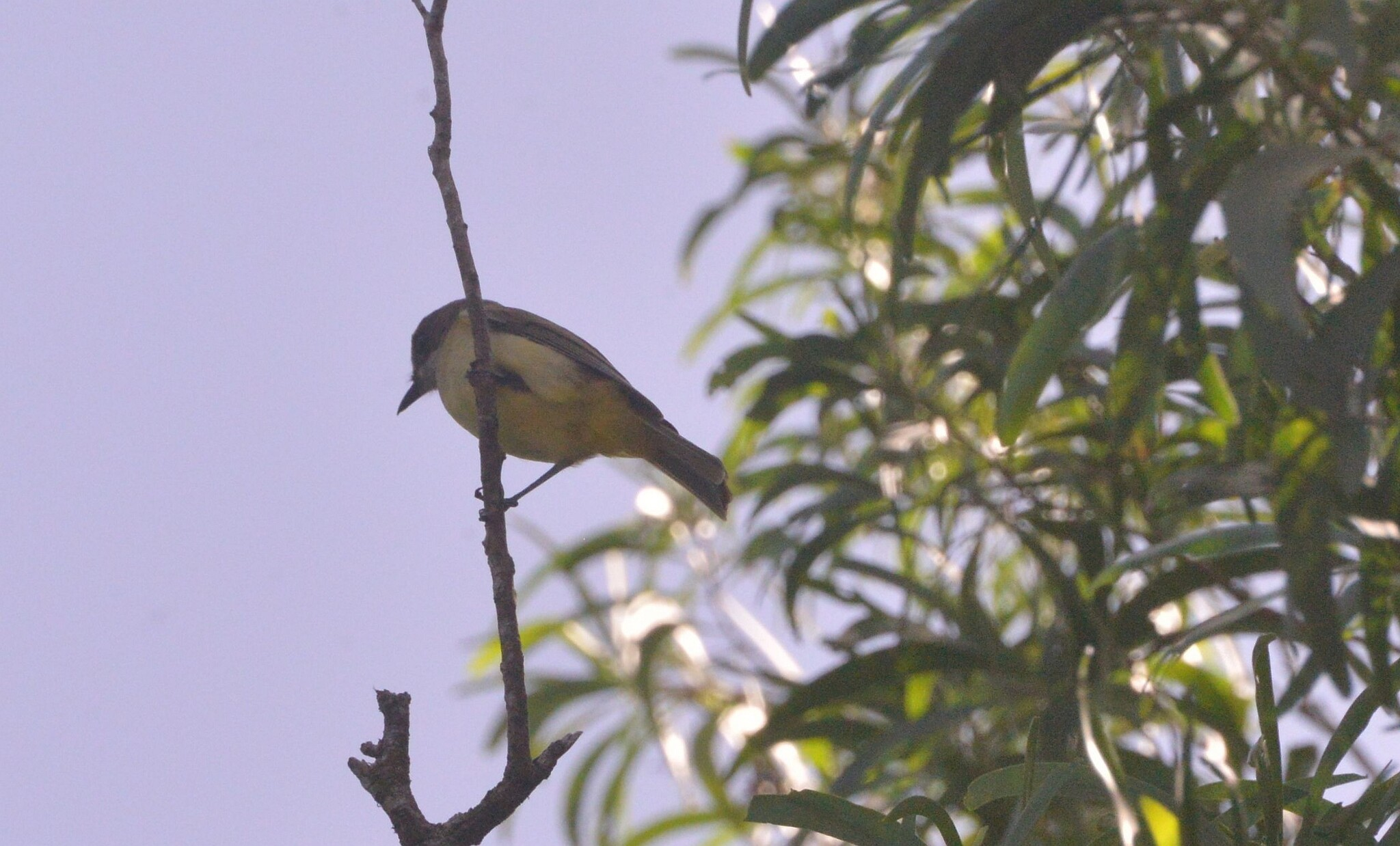

Scientific classification
- Kingdom: Animalia
- Phylum: Chordata
- Class: Aves
- Order: Passeriformes
- Family: Pachycephalidae
- Genus: Pachycephala
- Species: P. chlorura

Binomial name
- Pachycephala chlorura G.R. Gray, 1860

Subspecies
- See text

Synonyms
- Pachycephala caledonica chlorura; Pachycephala chlorurus; Pachycephala pectoralis chlorura

= Melanesian whistler =

Species of bird

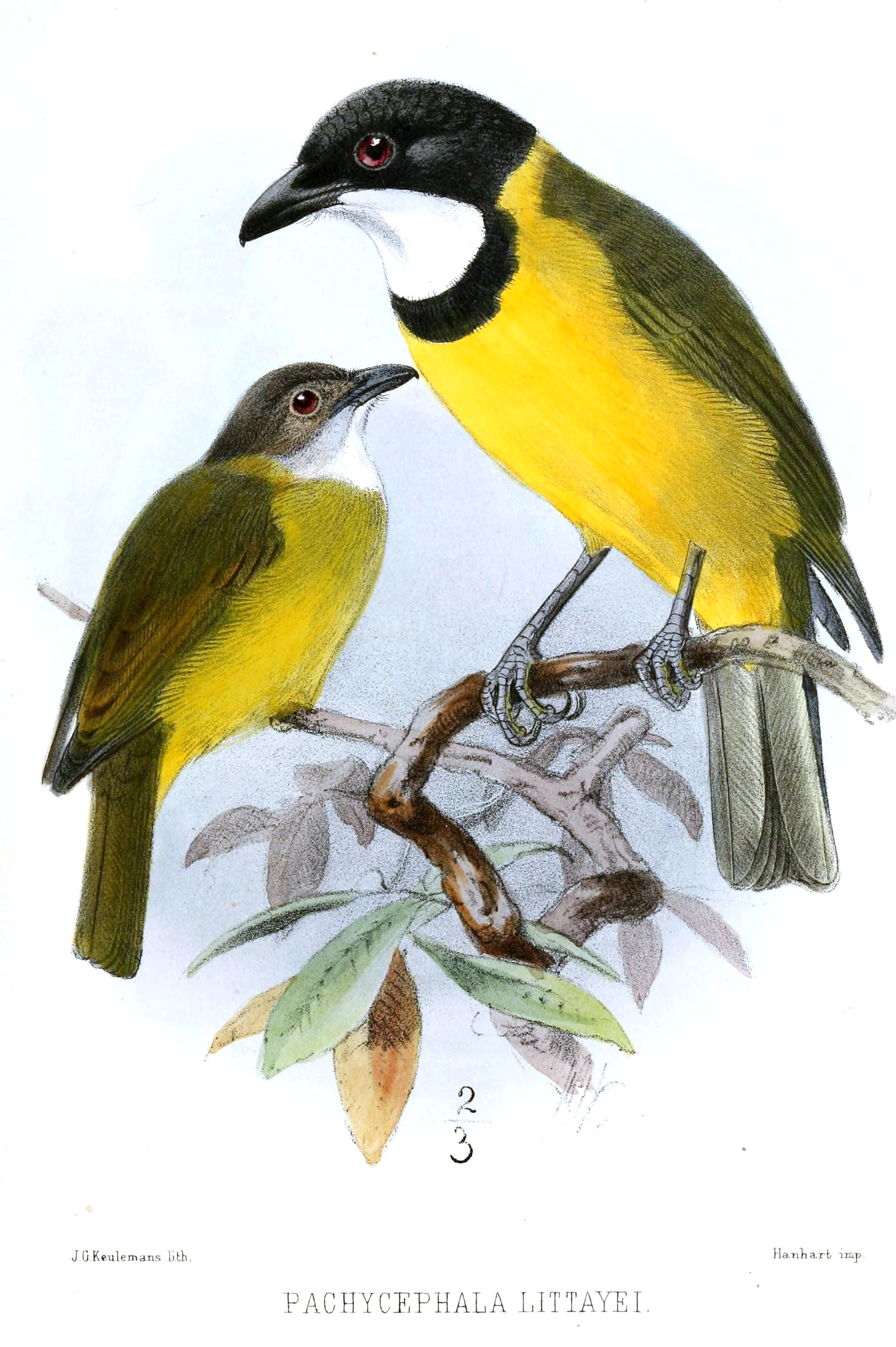
Pachycephala chlorura littayei

The Melanesian whistler (Pachycephala chlorura) or Vanuatu whistler, is a species of passerine bird in the whistler family Pachycephalidae. It is found on the Loyalty Islands, Vanuatu, and Vanikoro in the far south-eastern Solomons.

== Taxonomy and systematics ==
Until 2014, the Melanesian whistler was considered conspecific with the New Caledonian whistler. Formerly, it has also been treated as a subspecies of the golden whistler.

=== Subspecies ===
Four subspecies are recognized:

- P. c. intacta - Sharpe, 1900: Originally described as a separate species. Found on Banks Islands and northern and central Vanuatu
- P. c. cucullata - (Gray, G.R., 1860): Originally described as a separate species in the genus Eopsaltria. Found on Anatom Island (southern Vanuatu)
- P. c. chlorura - Gray, G.R., 1860: Found on Erromango (southern Vanuatu)
- Loyalty Island golden whistler (P. c. littayei) - Layard, EL, 1878: Originally described as a separate species. Found on the Loyalty Islands

== Description ==
The species is a medium-sized whistler, typically around 14–16 centimetres (5.5–6.3 in) in length and weighing 18–25 grams (0.63–0.88 oz), though some subspecies are larger. In the nominate subspecies the male has a dark slate-grey crown, face and nape, a white throat, ochraceous-yellow belly and rump, and olive back and wings with a black line between the throat and belly. The legs are dark brown. Males of other subspecies share the white throat, but are less ochraceous below, and may –depending on the exact subspecies involved– have a far broader black band between the throat and belly, and a black or olive crown, face and nape.

In the nominate subspecies the female is duller than the male with a buff belly and rump, no line between the throat and belly, and an olive-brown head, back and wings. The legs are lighter brown than in the male. Females of some other subspecies have a yellow belly, and a greyish, brownish or olive throat.

== Distribution and habitat ==
It inhabits humid forest, including degraded forest and forest edges, from sea level up to at least 900 metres (3,000 ft). They are relatively common in suitable habitat, particularly below 300 metres (980 ft). The species is sedentary.

== Behaviour and ecology ==
=== Breeding ===
A small nest (6 cm in diameter) is built out of sticks and spider web and suspended from small branches above the ground. Two eggs, which are white and blotched with brown, are laid and incubated by both parents.

=== Food and feeding ===
The Melanesian whistler feeds on insects, also taking snails and seeds. It feeds in the foliage of trees and shrubs, and on the branches, presumably in a similar fashion to the closely related golden whistler.
