= List of diplomatic missions of Vanuatu =

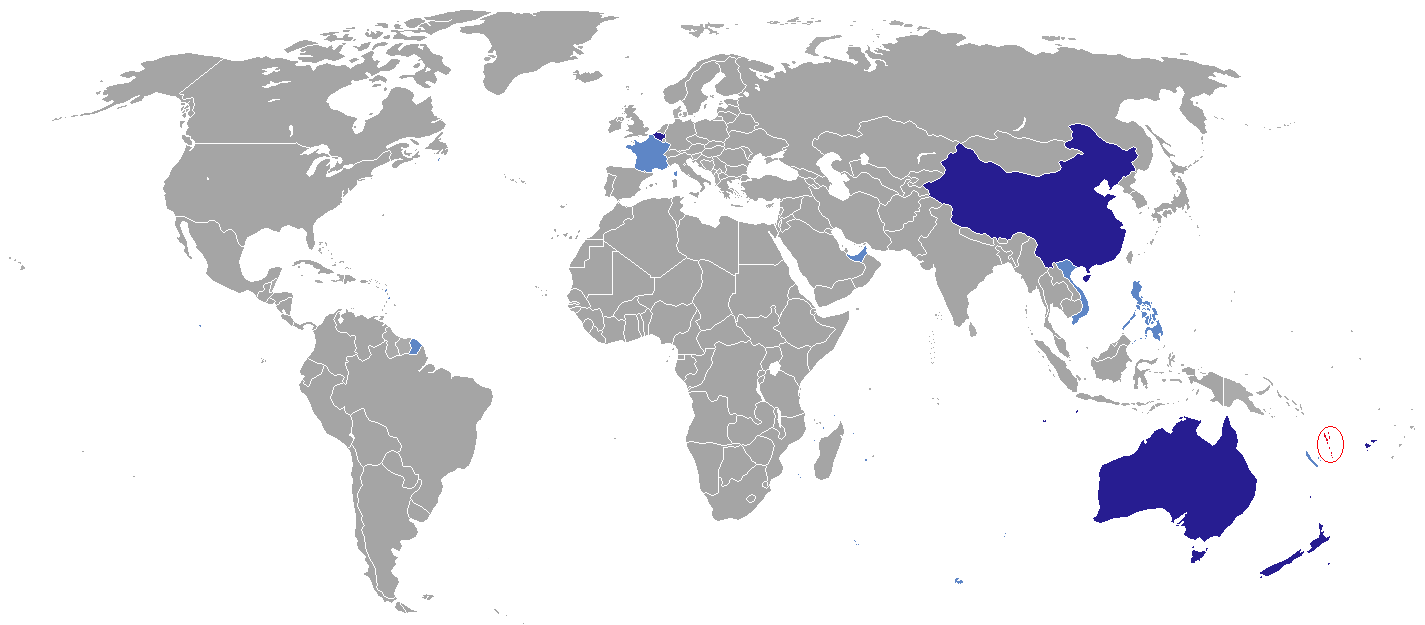
Location of diplomatic missions of Vanuatu: Vanuatu Embassy/High Commission Consulate-General

This is a list of diplomatic missions of Vanuatu. The Pacific island state of Vanuatu only has fifteen diplomatic missions abroad.

== Asia ==
- China
  - Beijing (Embassy)
  - Guangzhou (Consulate-General)
  - Hong Kong (Consulate-General)
  - Shanghai (Consulate-General)
- India
  - New Delhi (High Commission)
- Philippines
  - Manila (Consulate-General)
- United Arab Emirates
  - Dubai (Consulate-General)
- Vietnam
  - Ho Chi Minh City (Consulate-General)

== Europe ==
- Belgium
  - Brussels (Embassy) (Note: Also accredited to the European Union.)

== Oceania ==
- Australia
  - Canberra (High Commission) (Note: Also accredited to the Guatemala.)
  - Sydney (Consulate-General)
- Fiji
  - Suva (High Commission)
- New Caledonia
  - Nouméa, (Consulate-General)
- New Zealand
  - Wellington (High Commission)
  - Auckland (Consulate-General)

== Multilateral organisations ==
- United Nations
  - Geneva (Permanent Mission)
  - New York City (Permanent Mission)

== See also ==
- Foreign relations of Vanuatu
- Visa policy of Vanuatu
- List of diplomatic missions in Vanuatu
