= Telecommunications in Vanuatu =

The telecommunication systems in Vanuatu provides voice and data services to the island nation.

== Telephone ==
The country calling code is 678. The mobile phone system had 137,000 connections as of 2012. The operators are Vodafone – (GSM) (EDGE) and Digicel – (GSM) (HSPA+/3G) (EDGE). The fixed-line telephone system included 5,800 connections as of that year. It is operated by Vodafone.

The system is served by copper wire on the main island aided by radio links in outer islands. Satellite service is provided by Intelsat (Pacific Ocean).

== Radio ==
The nation has 2 AM, 4 FM, and 1 shortwave stations as of 2004. The count of radios was 62,000 in 1997.

== Television ==
The two television broadcast stations are 1NOMO TV Channel (Terrestrial- & web-distributed, English & Bislama content) and Television Blong Vanuatu (Terrestrial-distributed, Bislama & French content)

Three Pay-TV (local) providers offered service as of 2011:

- Telsat Pacific (Terrestrial-distributed, English content)
- CanalSat (Satellite-distributed, French content)
- Servicom (Satellite-distributed, English content)

== Internet ==
Vanuatu's country code (Top level domain) is .vu. It is managed by Telecom Vanuatu Limited (Vodafone Vanuatu) as "VUNIC".

=== Internet Service Providers (ISPs) ===
Digicel Vanuatu Limited – Provides WIMAX (1 Mbit/s - 20 Mbit/s), 3G & GPRS mobile internet services. Off-island connectivity is provided via fibre optic cable. The minimum speed offered for fixed internet is 1 Mbit/s on residential packages.

Business packages are offered in speeds of 1 Mbit/s to 20 Mbit/s and can be tailored to individual requirements. Business internet packages can be either shared or dedicated bandwidth. WAN, IPLC & other business data services are offered. Digicel has the widest coverage of any operator in Vanuatu and is the only operator capable of providing fixed internet services in many outer island locations.

Telecom Vanuatu Limited (TVL) – Provides WIMAX (256 kb – 1 Mb), ADSL (128 kb – 1 Mb), Wireless (limited to downtown Port Vila) and various fixed and leased line services. VSAT is available for rural Vanuatu. Prepaid and Postpaid options are available.

Telsat Broadband Limited – Provides Carrier-Grade Wireless coverage to Port Vila and surrounds via their own independent network. Telsat also supplies and maintains VSAT systems for the other remote parts of Vanuatu. The minimum speed offered is 256 kbit/s up to 2 Mbit/s but can tailor plans. Pre-Paid and Subscription options are available. Telsat Broadband has data caps in effect on all standard accounts but does not have lock-in contracts.

Wantok Network Limited provides wireless 4G internet in Port Vila and surrounding areas. The minimum speed offered is 1 Mbit/s with plans starting from Vt2,300 per month with no lock-in contracts.

Interchange Limited, has constructed the Interchange Cable Network which connects Port Vila, Vanuatu to Suva, Fiji via a fiber optic cable. The capacity of the cable is over 200 times Vanuatu's previous capacity, with the ability to upgrade the capacity in the future should more bandwidth be required. Interchange plans to construct two more cables, one will connect Port Vila to the Solomon Islands (with a spur to the Vanuatu island of Espiritu Santo). The other will connect Vanuatu to New Caledonia (with a spur to the Vanuatu island of Tanna).

== See also ==
- Media of Vanuatu
