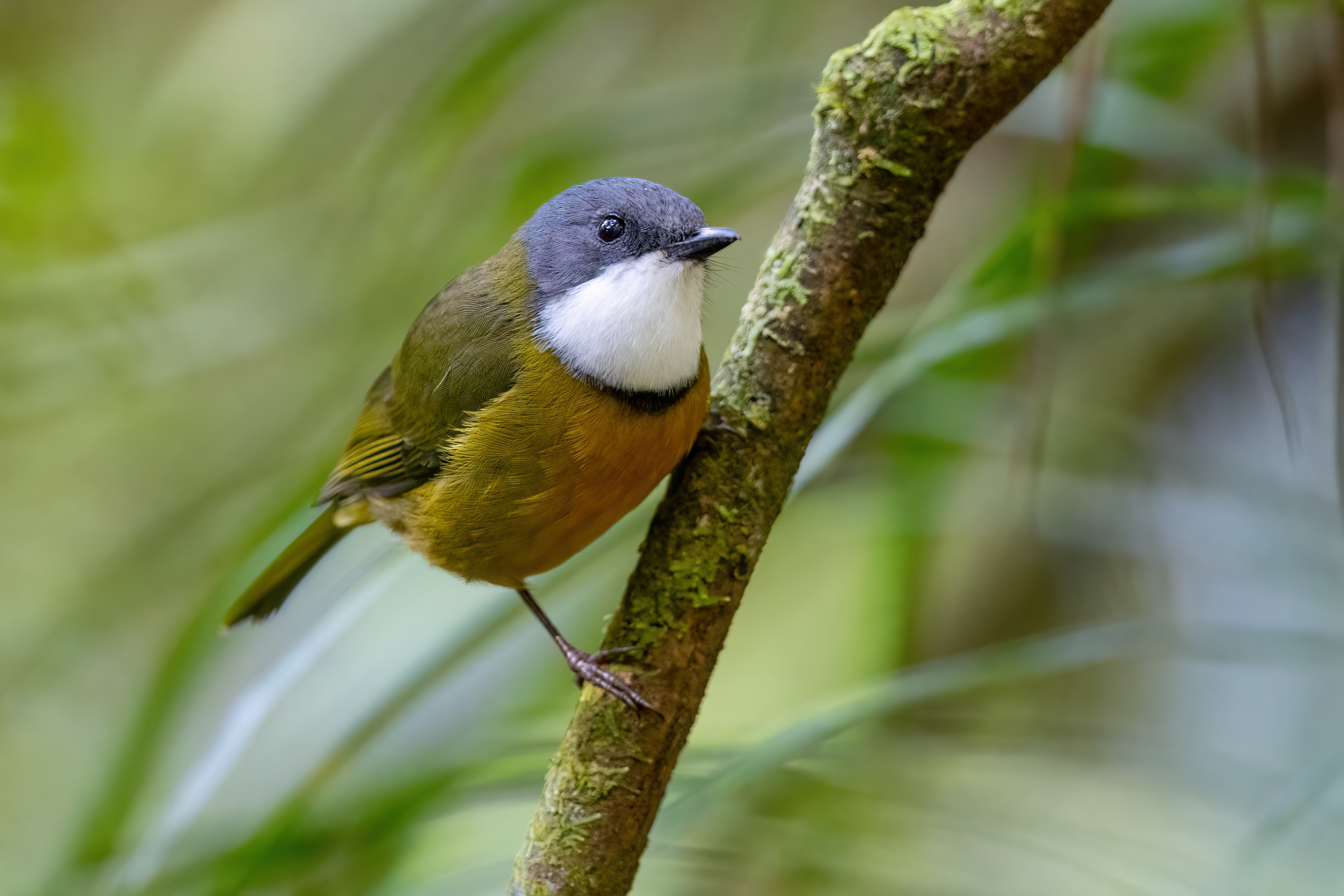

Conservation status
- Least Concern (IUCN 3.1)

Scientific classification
- Kingdom: Animalia
- Phylum: Chordata
- Class: Aves
- Order: Passeriformes
- Family: Pachycephalidae
- Genus: Pachycephala
- Species: P. caledonica

Binomial name
- Pachycephala caledonica (Gmelin, JF, 1789)

Synonyms
- Muscicapa caledonica; Pachycephala pectoralis caledonica

= New Caledonian whistler =

Species of bird

The New Caledonian whistler (Pachycephala caledonica) is a species of bird in the family Pachycephalidae. It is endemic to New Caledonia.

== Taxonomy ==
The New Caledonian whistler was formally described in 1789 by the German naturalist Johann Friedrich Gmelin in his revised and expanded edition of Carl Linnaeus's Systema Naturae. He placed it with the flycatchers in the genus Muscicapa and coined the binomial name Muscicapa caledonica. Gmelin based his account on the "olive flycatcher" from New Caledonia that had been described in 1783 by the English ornithologist John Latham in his book A General Synopsis of Birds. The naturalist Joseph Banks had provided Latham with a drawing of the bird. The species is monotypic: no subspecies are recognised.

The New Caledonian whistler was formerly treated as a subspecies of the golden whistler. Until 2014, it was considered conspecific with the Melanesian whistler.
