= Transport in Vanuatu =

Vanuatu's undeveloped road system, with fewer than 100 miles of paved roads, consists mostly of dirt tracks suitable only for four-wheel-drive vehicles. Every island has one or two short airstrips where Air Vanuatu’s Twin Otter planes land two or three times weekly. In addition, every island has a small port or wharf where small cargo ships and boats regularly dock.

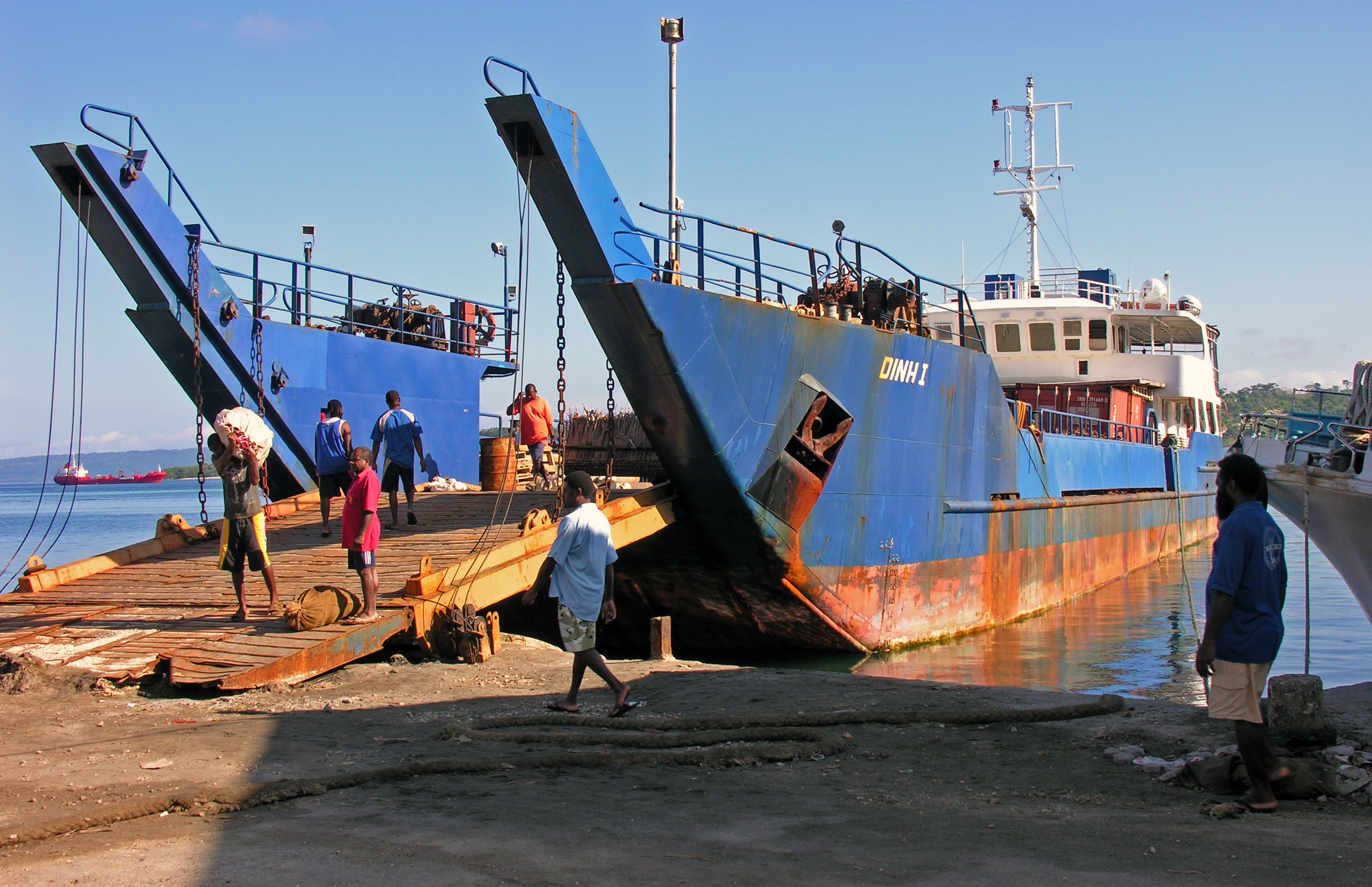
An inter-island ferry

After arrival on an island, transportation is usually via pickup truck, foot, or small boat. Bicycles are becoming popular in Vanuatu. Port Vila and Luganville have numerous taxis and mass-transit vans. There are no railways in Vanuatu, although there was a small rail line on Efate during the colonial era.

Vanuatu's main harbors are Forari, Port-Vila, Santo (Espiritu Santo).

== Modes of transport ==
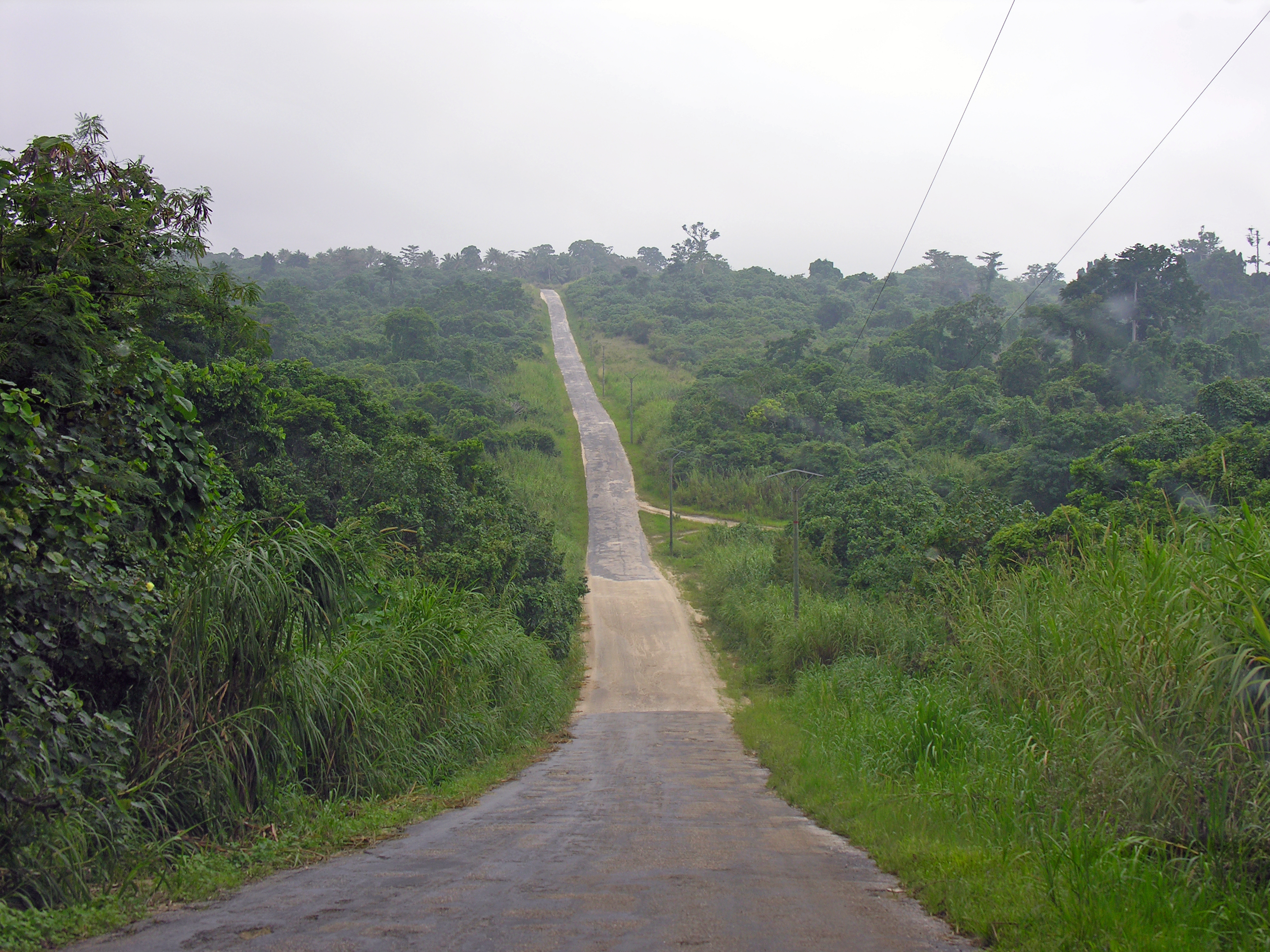
Efate main highway

Highways:
total: 1,070 km
paved: 256 km
unpaved: 814 km (1996 est.)

Merchant marine:
total: 78 ships (1,000 GT or over) totaling 1,266,634 GT/1,618,877 tonnes deadweight (DWT)
ships by type: bulk 27, cargo 24, chemical tanker 3, combination bulk 2, container 1, liquified gas 4, petroleum tanker 2, refrigerated cargo 9, vehicle carrier 6 (1999 est.)
note: a flag of convenience registry; includes ships from 15 countries among which are ships of Japan 28, India 10, US 10, Greece 3, Hong Kong 3, Australia 2, Canada 1, China 1, and France 1 (1998 est.)

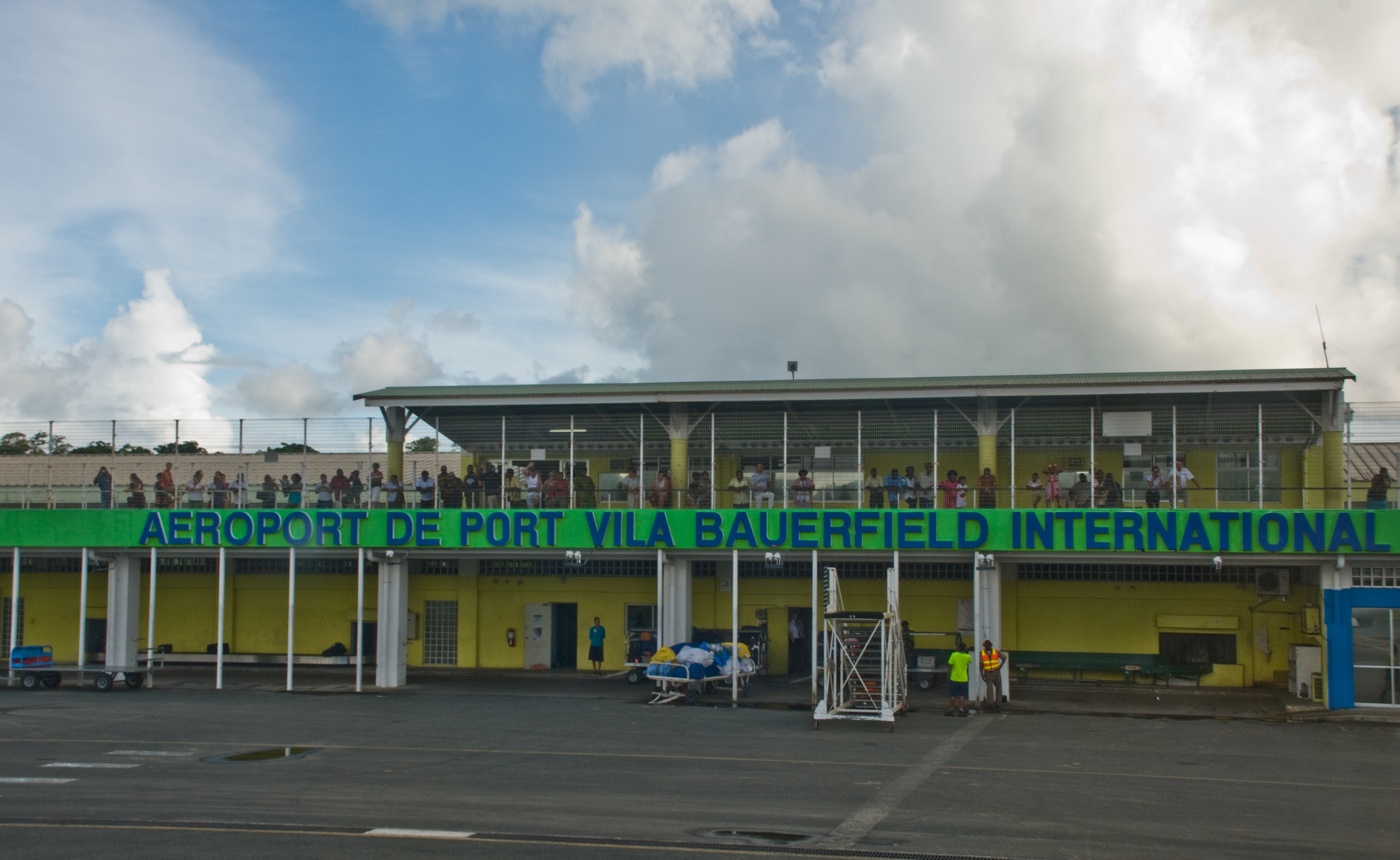
The international terminal, Port Vila Airport

Airports: 32 (1999 est.) (See Bauerfield International Airport.)

Airports - with paved runways:
total: 3
2,438 to 3,047 m: 1
1,524 to 2,437 m: 1
914 to 1,523 m: 1 (1999 est.)

Airports - with unpaved runways:
total: 29
1,524 to 2,437 m: 1
914 to 1,523 m: 11
under 914 m: 17 (1999 est.)
