= .vu =

Internet country code top-level domain for Vanuatu

- Introduced: 10 April 1995
- TLD type: Country code top-level domain
- Status: Active
- Registry: GoDaddy Registry
- Sponsor: Telecommunications Radiocommunications and Broadcasting Regulator
- Intended use: Entities connected with Vanuatu
- Actual use: Some use in and outside Vanuatu
- Registration restrictions: Some domain names reserved (archived)
- Structure: Registrations are taken directly at second level. Some third-level names also exist within second-level labels such as .gov.vu.
- Documents: Terms and conditions (archived)
- Registry website: www.hello.vu

.vu is the Internet country code top-level domain (ccTLD) for Vanuatu. Initially delegated to Telecom Vanuatu Ltd, it was redelegated to the Telecommunications Radiocommunications and Broadcasting Regulator in 2019. On 15 May 2019, Registry Services, LLC (GoDaddy Registry) became the registry operator for .vu.
