= Geography of Vanuatu =

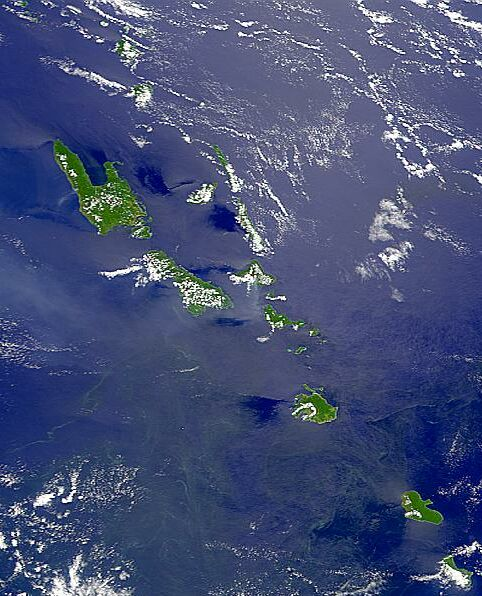
- Region: Pacific Ocean
- Coordinates: 16°00′S 167°00′E
- Area: Ranked 157th
  - Total: 12,189 km^{2} (4,706 sq mi)
  - Land: 100%
  - Water: 0%
- Coastline: 2,528 km (1,571 mi)
- Borders: None
- Highest point: Mount Tabwemasana; 1,877 metres (6,158 ft)
- Lowest point: Pacific Ocean; 0 metres (0 ft)
- Exclusive economic zone: 663,251 km^{2} (256,083 mi^{2})

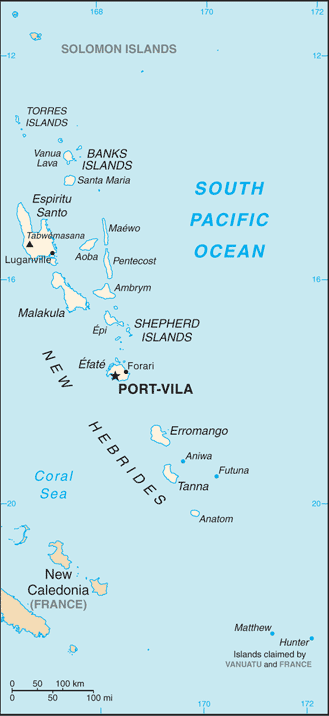
Map of Vanuatu

Vanuatu, known as the New Hebrides from 1774 until 1980, is a nation and group of around 80 mountainous islands in the South Pacific Ocean. It is part of Oceania. There are several active volcanoes among the islands, the most well-known one being Mount Yasur on Tanna. It has a tropical rainforest climate, and tropical cyclones occur between December and April. As of 2024 the population is around 318,000. The economy is mainly reliant on subsistence agriculture and tourism.

Vanuatu is party to a number of international agreements relating to the environment.

== Location and description ==
Vanuatu's geographic coordinates are 16°00′S 167°00′E. The archipelago is part of Oceania. Its immediate neighbours include the Solomon Islands and New Caledonia, and Australia is the closest continent.

It is composed of over 80 islands, of which around 65 are inhabited. It has 2,528 kilometres (1,571 mi) of coastline and a total surface area of 12,189 km^{2} (4,706 mi^{2}). Due to the spread-out islands, it has the 39th largest exclusive economic zone of 663,251 km^{2} (256,083 mi^{2}) (200 nautical miles).

== Geology and terrain ==
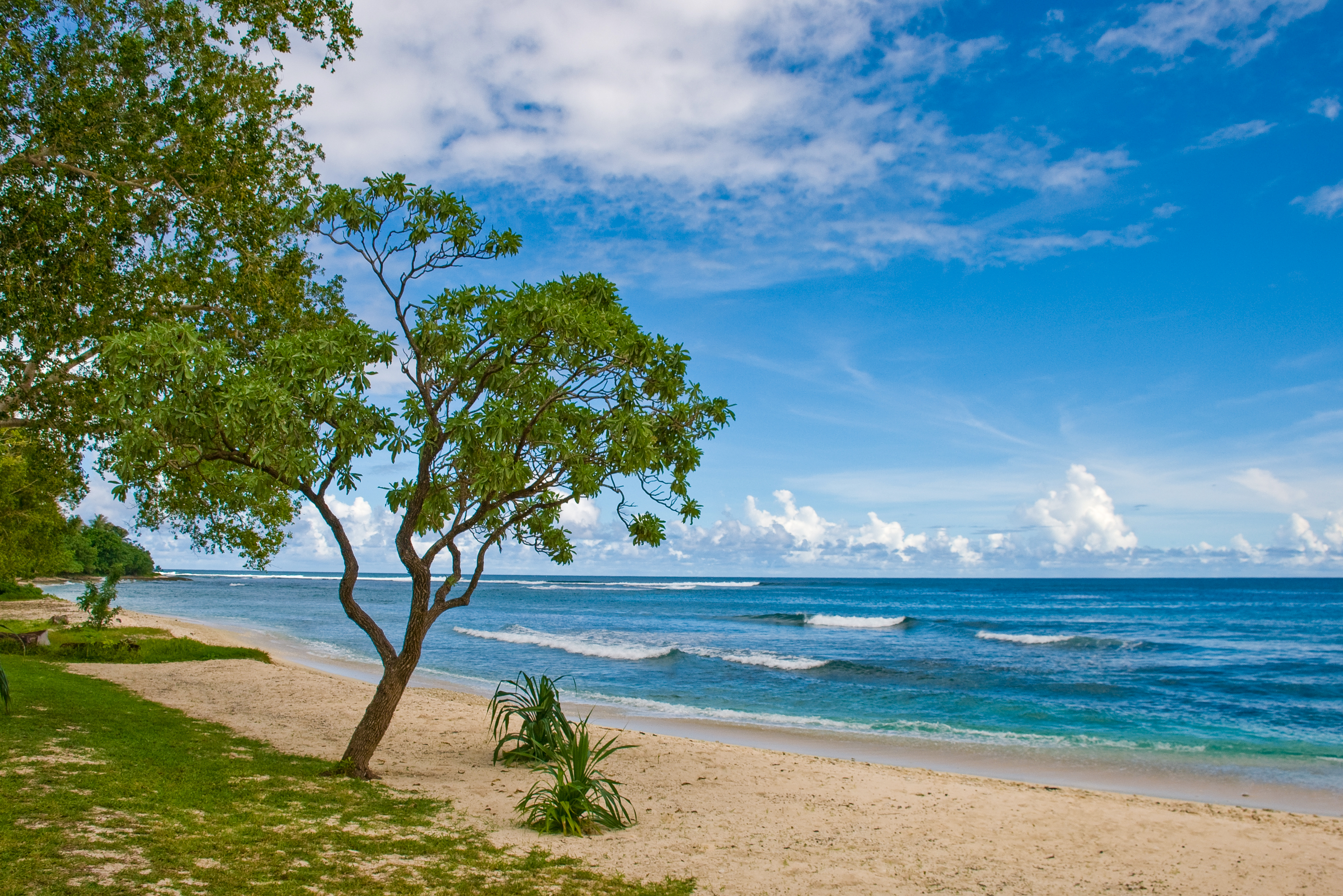
A beach on Efate

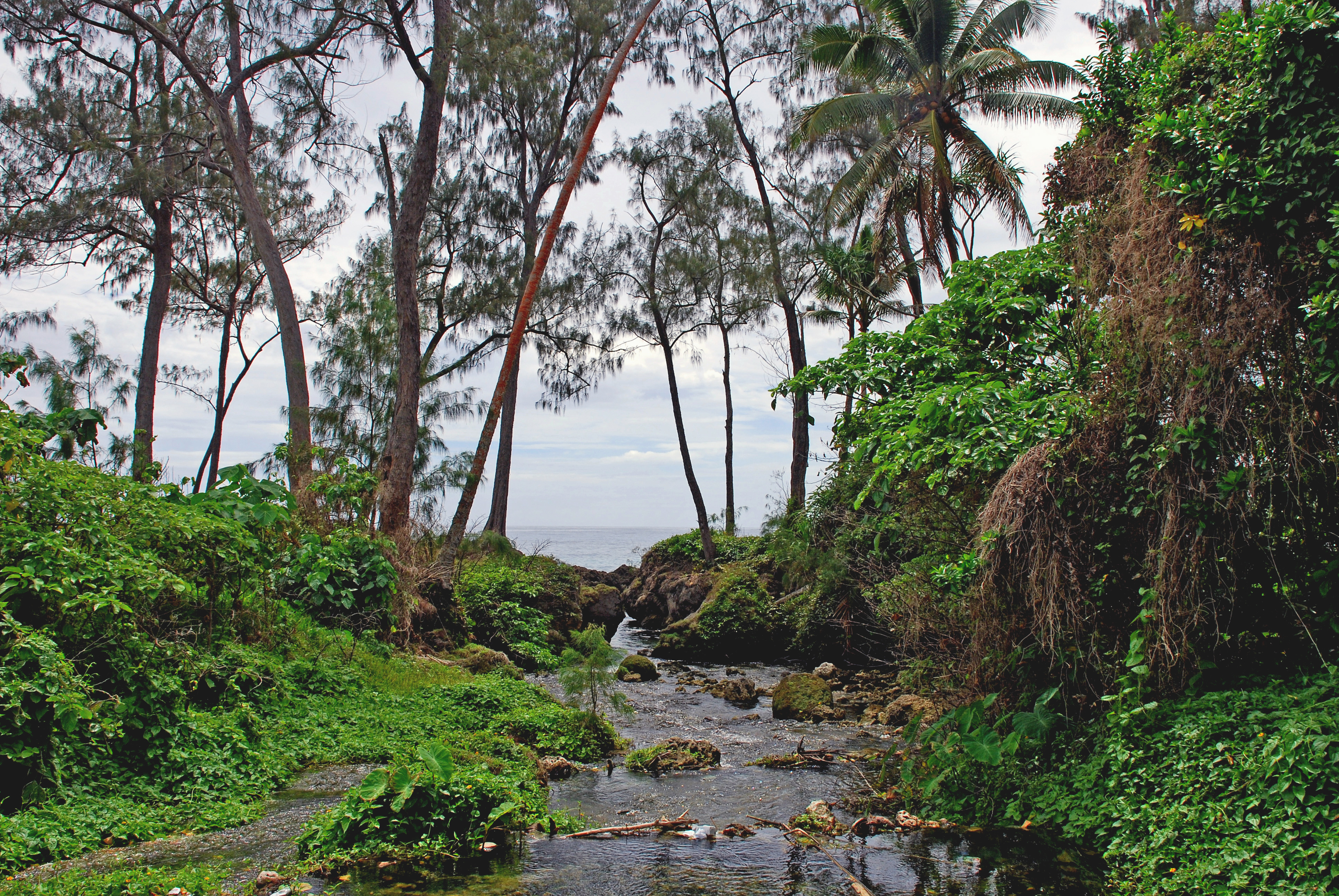
A stream on Efate

The island arc of Vanuatu occur at the boundary of the Pacific and Indo-Australian plates. The oceanic crust of the latter is pushing eastwards under the former, which leads to volcanic activity and earthquakes, and some parts of the islands are being raised up to 2 cm (0.79 in) per year, exposing raised coral reefs.

Vanuatu is a mountainous archipelago of volcanic origin with narrow coastal plains. The highest of all the mountains is Mount Tabwemasana at 1,877 metres (6,158 ft). Active volcanoes include Mount Yasur (361 m (1,184 ft)) on Tanna, the most active one, as well as potentially active ones such as Aoba, Ambrym, Epi, Gaua, Kuwae (a submarine volcano), Lopevi, Suretamatai, and Traitor's Head. There are also underwater volcanoes. Volcanic activity on and around the islands sometimes causes minor earthquakes, and tsunamis are also a hazard.

Between 1903 and 1905, one of the first major geological works of the region was produced by Australian geologist Sir Douglas Mawson. After spending from April to September 1903 exploring the islands with W.T. Quaife, Mawson produced a report which included the first geological maps of the island of Efate and of the south-west part of Santo. Mawson's detailed report, "The Geology of the New Hebrides", was published in the Proceedings of the Linnean Society of New South Wales in December 1905. Mawson made reference to previous geological and geographical observations made by Commodore Goodenough and local missionaries, as well as English, French, and German workers on the islands. He described the raised coral reefs on the island of Santo and included cross-section drawings of the reefs and Steep Gully in at Havannah Harbour on Efate. He also sailed past and made mention of all of the other islands, and described seeing volcanic activity and experiencing earthquakes. He was unable to land on Tanna and see Yasur first-hand, but derived notes from a local missionary about it. He also took photographs of geological features as well as taking extensive notes on the expedition, which are held in the Polar Collection of the South Australian Museum in Adelaide.

Later, paleontologist Frederick Chapman mentions Mawson's collection of Foraminifera specimens collected in the New Hebrides, and the two of them had a paper published about the calcareous alga Halimeda in the prestigious Quarterly Journal of the Geological Society in 1906.

== People and the economy ==
Vanuatu is a parliamentary republic. In 2024 the population of Vanuatu was around 318,007, of whom 99% are Ni-Vanuatu people, with more females than males. The median ages is 24.6 years. There are over 100 indigenous languages; the official ones are the creole English-based language Bislama, English, and French.

Around 26% of the population is urbanised, with most of these living in two cities, Port Vila on Efate (population 53,000) and Luganville on Espiritu Santo. The literacy rate in 2024 was estimated at 88%.

The islands' natural resources include manganese, hardwood forests, and fish. As of 2022, 1.6% of its land area was arable, with agricultural land comprising 15.3% of land use. Around 10.3% of that was devoted to permanent crops. Forests cover around 36.3% of the islands. Crops include coconuts, oranges, yams, cabbages, taro, bananas, chillies, chestnuts, sweet potatoes, and cassava.

The economy is heavily reliant on subsistence agriculture and tourism, which has been adversely affected by the COVID-19 pandemic and Tropical Cyclone Harold in 2020. It receives aid for road infrastructure from Australia.

Environmental concerns include water pollution, a limited supply of potable water in rural areas, inadequate sanitation, and deforestation.

== International agreements ==
Vanuatu is party to a number of international agreements, including:

- Climate Change-Kyoto Protocol
- Climate Change-Paris Agreement
- Comprehensive Nuclear-Test-Ban Treaty
- United Nations Convention on the Law of the Sea
- Convention for the Conservation of Antarctic Marine Living Resources
- Convention on Biological Diversity (1992)
- United Nations Convention to Combat Desertification
- Endangered Species
- Marine Dumping-London Convention
- Marine Dumping-London Protocol (1996)
- Montreal Protocol on Substances That Deplete the Ozone Layer
- Convention on Wetlands

Closely tied to the Law of the Sea, Vanuatu lays maritime claim to 24 nautical miles (nm) of contiguous zone, 12 nm of territorial sea, and 200 nm of continental shelf and exclusive economic zone.

== Climate ==
Vanuatu has a tropical climate, more specifically a tropical rainforest climate (Af in the Köppen climate classification), with noticeably wetter and drier months and hot, humid conditions year-round. As the southeast trade winds are almost permanent and tropical cyclones are not rare in Port Vila and Vanuatu, the climate is not equatorial but a maritime trade-wind tropical climate. Rainfall is moderate from December to April.

=== Tropical cyclones ===
Vanuatu can be affected by tropical cyclones from December to April.

In March 2015, Cyclone Pam was one of the worst cyclones to ever hit Vanuatu, and had been described as a worst-case scenario for the country, with the estimated cost of damage being in the hundreds of millions.

In April 2020, Cyclone Harold caused severe damage to Vanuatu and other Pacific nations.

Climate data for Port Vila (Köppen Af)
Month	Jan	Feb	Mar	Apr	May	Jun	Jul	Aug	Sep	Oct	Nov	Dec	Year
Record high °C (°F)	35.0 (95.0)	33.9 (93.0)	33.5 (92.3)	32.5 (90.5)	31.1 (88.0)	32.0 (89.6)	34.3 (93.7)	32.0 (89.6)	31.5 (88.7)	31.2 (88.2)	33.0 (91.4)	35.6 (96.1)	35.6 (96.1)
Mean daily maximum °C (°F)	31.3 (88.3)	31.2 (88.2)	30.8 (87.4)	29.9 (85.8)	28.8 (83.8)	27.4 (81.3)	26.4 (79.5)	27.0 (80.6)	27.7 (81.9)	28.5 (83.3)	29.2 (84.6)	30.7 (87.3)	29.1 (84.4)
Daily mean °C (°F)	26.4 (79.5)	26.5 (79.7)	26.3 (79.3)	25.3 (77.5)	24.1 (75.4)	23.0 (73.4)	22.1 (71.8)	22.0 (71.6)	22.7 (72.9)	23.4 (74.1)	24.6 (76.3)	25.7 (78.3)	24.3 (75.7)
Mean daily minimum °C (°F)	22.5 (72.5)	23.0 (73.4)	22.6 (72.7)	22.0 (71.6)	20.2 (68.4)	19.8 (67.6)	18.2 (64.8)	18.0 (64.4)	18.4 (65.1)	19.6 (67.3)	20.7 (69.3)	21.7 (71.1)	20.5 (68.9)
Record low °C (°F)	15.8 (60.4)	15.0 (59.0)	16.3 (61.3)	14.5 (58.1)	13.4 (56.1)	10.0 (50.0)	8.5 (47.3)	10.0 (50.0)	9.9 (49.8)	11.0 (51.8)	12.6 (54.7)	15.2 (59.4)	8.5 (47.3)
Average rainfall mm (inches)	316.1 (12.44)	273.7 (10.78)	320.9 (12.63)	255.2 (10.05)	210.3 (8.28)	180.0 (7.09)	94.4 (3.72)	87.4 (3.44)	87.3 (3.44)	134.1 (5.28)	192.3 (7.57)	187.2 (7.37)	2,338.9 (92.09)
Average rainy days (≥ 1.0 mm)	15.4	16.6	18.5	17.1	12.9	11.3	10.3	9.8	8.1	8.4	12.1	13.2	153.7
Average relative humidity (%)	84	85	86	87	85	85	83	82	80	81	82	83	84
Average dew point °C (°F)	24 (75)	24 (75)	24 (75)	23 (73)	21 (70)	21 (70)	20 (68)	20 (68)	20 (68)	21 (70)	22 (72)	23 (73)	22 (71)
Mean monthly sunshine hours	220.1	155.4	198.4	165.0	170.5	162.0	148.8	167.4	174.0	198.4	180.0	195.3	2,135.3
Mean daily sunshine hours	7.1	5.5	6.4	5.5	5.5	5.4	4.8	5.4	5.8	6.4	6.0	6.3	5.8
Source 1: Deutscher Wetterdienst
Source 2: Time and Date (dewpoints, between 2005-2015)

== Forests ==
=== REDD+ reference level and monitoring ===
Under the UNFCCC REDD+ framework, Vanuatu has submitted a national forest reference level (FRL) package. On the UNFCCC REDD+ Web Platform, the country's 2023 submission is listed as having an assessed reference level, while a national strategy, safeguards information and a national forest monitoring system are all listed as "not reported".

The first assessed FRL, submitted in 2023 and technically assessed in 2024, covered three REDD+ activities at national scale: reducing emissions from deforestation, reducing emissions from forest degradation, and enhancement of forest carbon stocks. Using a 2008-2017 reference period, the original and modified submissions both reported an FRL of 732,441 t CO2 eq per year. The technical assessment states that it included above-ground biomass, below-ground biomass and dead organic matter, excluded soil organic carbon, reported CO2 only, and used a forest definition of at least 0.5 hectares, 10 percent canopy cover and trees at least 5 metres tall or capable of reaching that height in situ.
