= List of diplomatic missions in Vanuatu =

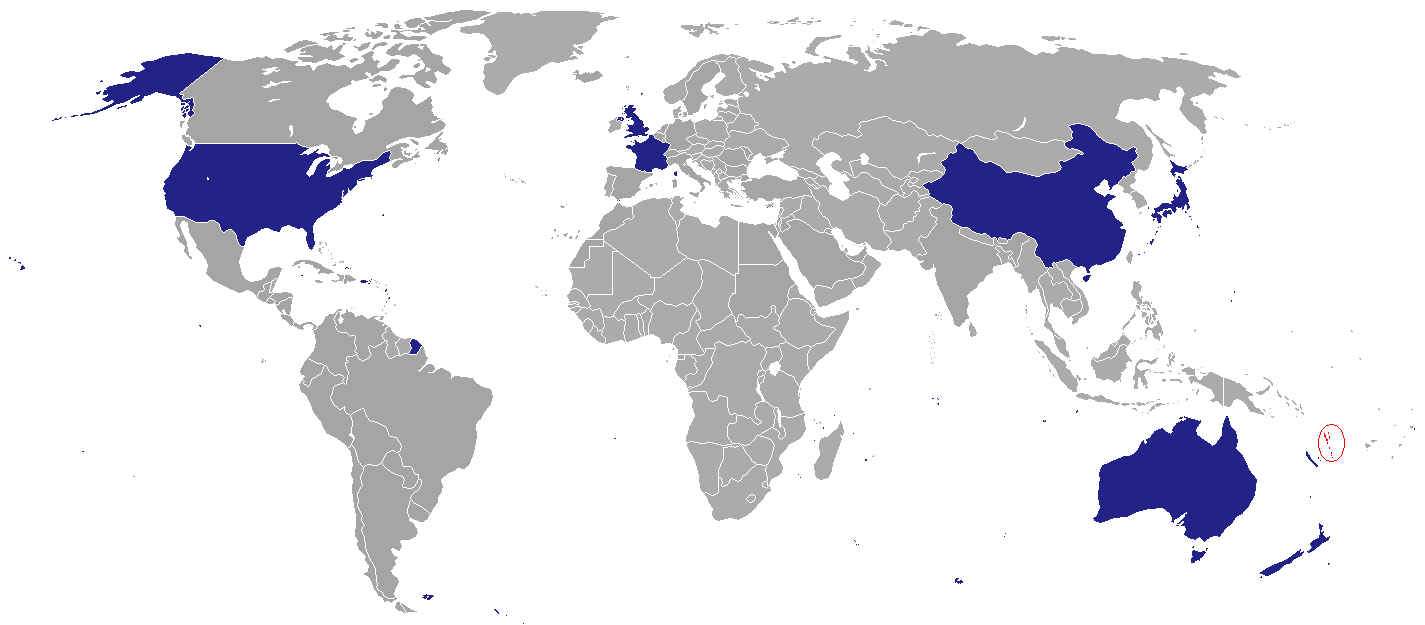
Diplomatic missions in Vanuatu

This article lists the diplomatic missions in Vanuatu. At present, the capital Port Vila hosts seven embassies. Several other countries are accredited through their embassies in Canberra or elsewhere.

== Embassies/High Commissions in Port Vila ==
1. Australia
2. China
3. France
4. Japan
5. New Zealand
6. United Kingdom
7. United States

== Other Posts in Port Vila ==
- European Union (Regionalised Delegation)

== Gallery ==
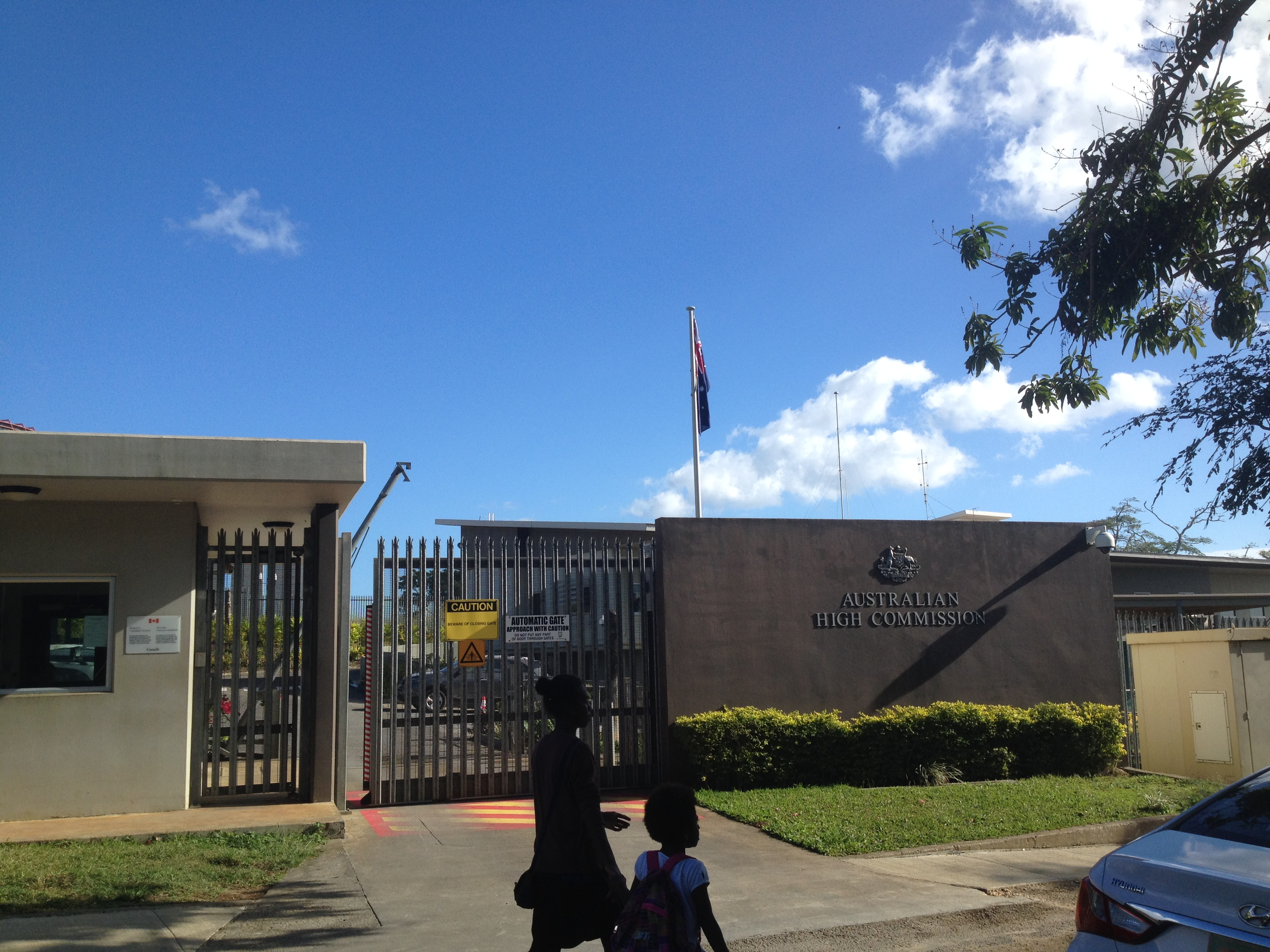
High Commission of Australia

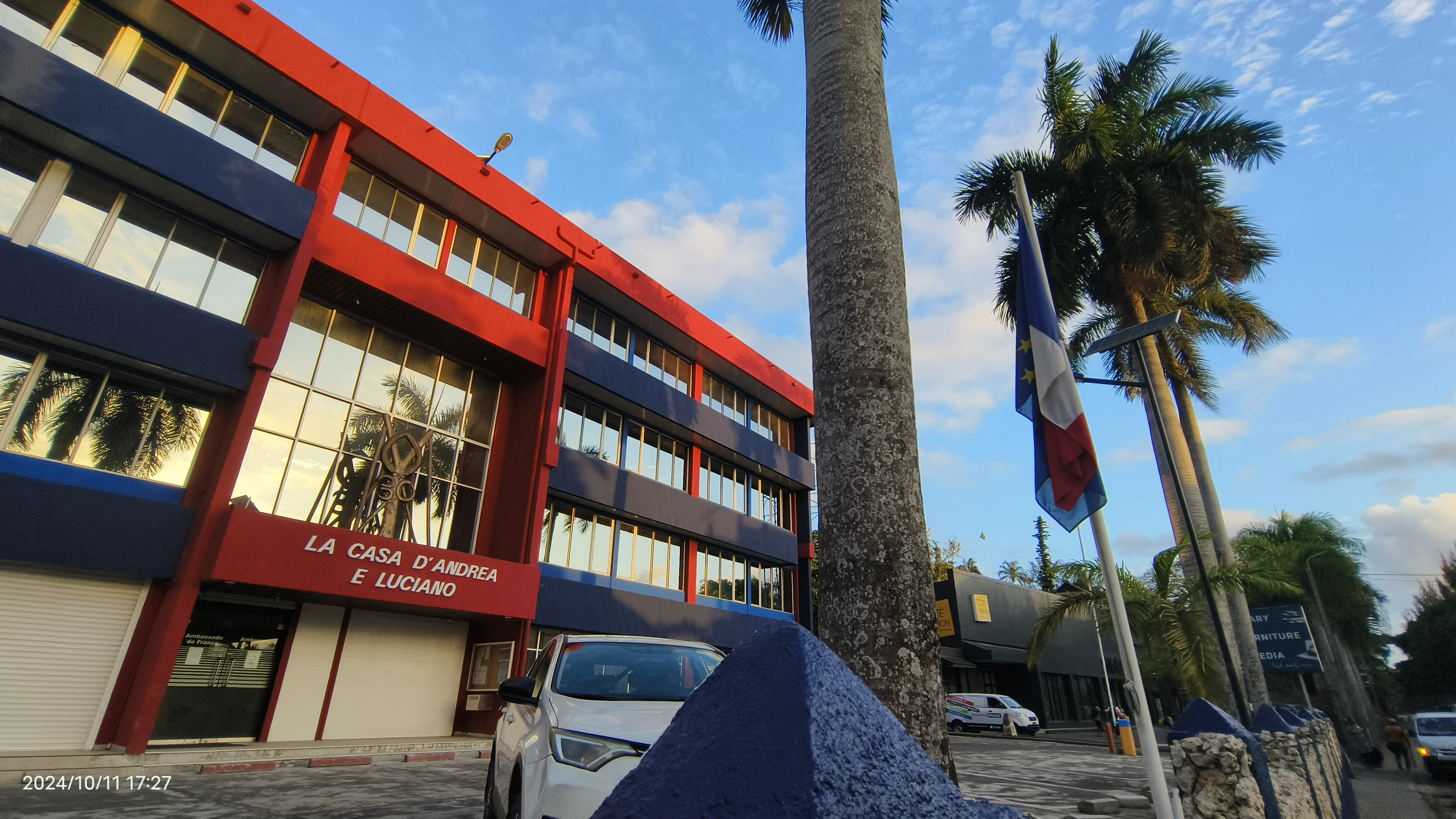
Embassy of France

== Non-Resident Embassies/High Commissions ==
Resident in Canberra, unless otherwise noted.

- Afghanistan
- Algeria
- Argentina
- Austria
- Antigua and Barbuda (Washington, D.C.)
- Bahrain
- Bangladesh
- Belgium
- Brazil
- Brunei
- Bhutan (Bangkok)
- Central African Republic (Pretoria)
- Cote d'Ivoire (Tokyo)
- Canada
- Chad (Beijing)
- Colombia
- Denmark
- Egypt
- Estonia
- Eswatini (Kuala Lumpur)
- Eritrea (Tokyo)
- Ethiopia
- Fiji (Port Moresby)
- Finland
- Ghana (Tokyo)
- Georgia
- Germany
- Guinea (Tokyo)
- Guinea-Bissau (Beijing)
- Indonesia
- India (Port Moresby)
- Iran
- Ireland (Wellington)
- Israel (Jerusalem)
- Italy
- Iraq
- Jordan
- Kuwait
- Kyrgyzstan (Tokyo)
- Kosovo
- Laos
- Lebanon
- Libya
- Lesotho (Tokyo)
- Maldives (Kuala Lumpur)
- Mali (Tokyo)
- Malaysia (Port Moresby)
- Malta (Valletta)
- Mexico
- Morocco
- North Korea (Jakarta)
- Nepal
- Norway
- Netherlands
- Oman (Tokyo)
- Palestine
- Pakistan
- Philippines
- Portugal
- Poland
- Qatar
- Russia
- Romania
- Sahrawi Republic (Dili)
- Serbia
- Seychelles (New York City)
- Sierra Leone (Seoul)
- Singapore (Suva)
- South Africa
- Saudi Arabia
- South Korea (Port Moresby)
- Spain
- Sudan
- Sweden (Stockholm)
- Switzerland
- Senegal (Tokyo)
- South Sudan
- Seychelles
- Thailand
- Taiwan (Port Moresby)
- Turkmenistan (Tokyo)
- Tajikistan (Tokyo)
- Timor-Leste
- Togo (Tokyo)
- Tonga (Suva)
- Turkey
- Tunisia
- United Arab Emirates
- Uruguay
- Uganda
- Uzbekistan
- Venezuela
- Vietnam
- Yemen
- Zambia (Tokyo)
- Zimbabwe (Tokyo)

== See also ==
- Foreign relations of Vanuatu
- List of diplomatic missions of Vanuatu
