= Interchange Cable Network =

Undersea data cable network

Interchange Cable
- Cable type: Fibre-optic
- Construction beginning: 2013
- Construction finished: 2014
- Design capacity: 1280 Gbit/s
- Lit capacity: 20 Gbit/s/cable
- Built by: Alcatel-Lucent
- Area served: Vanuatu
- Owner(s): Interchange Limited
- Website: interchange.vu

The Interchange Cable Network is a series of subsea fiber optic cables owned by Vanuatu-based company Interchange Limited. The first cable, ICN1 (Interchange Cable Network 1) links Fiji to Vanuatu and has been in service since 15 January 2014.

The cable landing points are:

- Blacksands Beach, Port Vila, Efate, Vanuatu
- Suva, Fiji

Alcatel Subsea Cable Vessel “Isle De Re” commenced cable laying on 10 November 2013 at the Fijian end of the cable. The cable arrived in Port Vila on 25 November 2013, 3 days ahead of schedule. This cable provides 20 Gbit/s, which is more than 200 times the previous capacity of Vanuatu's satellite system.

Two more cables are planned that will provide back-up to the Interchange Cable Network in case of a disruption. ICN2 (Interchange Cable Network 2) will link Port Vila with Honiara, Solomon Islands, and ICN3 will link the Vanuatu island Tanna with Noumea, New Caledonia. A spur is planned to connect ICN2 with Vanuatu's largest island by land area, Espiritu Santo.
