= List of airports in Vanuatu =

This is a list of airports in Vanuatu, sorted by location.

== Airports ==
Airport names shown in bold indicate the airport has scheduled commercial airline service.

City and/or Island	Province	ICAO	IATA	Airport name
Aneityum (Anatom) / Inyeug	Tafea	NVVA	AUY	**Anatom Airport** (Aneityum Airport)
Aniwa	Tafea	NVVB	AWD	Aniwa Airport
Craig Cove, Ambrym	Malampa	NVSF	CCV	**Craig Cove Airport**
Dillon's Bay, Erromango	Tafea	NVVD	DLY	Dillon's Bay Airport
Sisiwo, Emae, Shepherd Islands	Shefa	NVSE	EAE	Siwo Airport (Aromai Airport)
Futuna	Tafea	NVVF	FTA	Futuna Airport
Gaua, Banks Islands	Torba	NVSQ	ZGU	**Gaua Airport**
Ipota, Erromango	Tafea	NVVI	IPA	Ipota Airport
Lamap, Malekula	Malampa	NVSL	LPM	**Malekula Airport** (Lamap Airport)
Lamen Bay, Epi	Shefa	NVSM	LNB	**Lamen Bay Airport**
Longana, Ambae	Penama	NVSG	LOD	**Longana Airport**
Lonorore, Pentecost	Penama	NVSO	LNE	**Lonorore Airport**
Luganville, Espiritu Santo	Sanma	NVSS	SON	**Santo-Pekoa International Airport**
Maewo	Penama	NVSN	MWF	**Maewo-Naone Airport**
Mota Lava, Banks Islands	Torba	NVSA	MTV	**Mota Lava Airport** (Valua Airport)
Norsup, Malekoula	Malampa	NVSP	NUS	**Norsup Airport**
Olpoi, Espiritu Santo	Sanma	NVSZ	OLJ	Olpoi Airport (North West Santo Airport)
Tavie, Paama	Malampa	NVSI	PBJ	Paama Airport
Port Vila, Efate	Shefa	NVVV	VLI	**Bauerfield International Airport**
Quoin Hill, Efate	Shefa	NVVQ	UIQ	Quoin Hill Airport
Redcliffe, Ambae	Penama	NVSR	RCL	Redcliffe Airport
Sara, Pentecost	Penama	NVSH	SSR	**Sara Airport**
Sola, Vanua Lava, Banks Islands	Torba	NVSC	SLH	**Vanua Lava Airport**
Wintua, Malakula	Malampa	NVSX	SWJ	South West Bay Airport
Whitegrass, Tanna	Tafea	NVVW	TAH	**Whitegrass Airport** (Tanna Airport)
Tongoa, Shepherd Islands	Shefa	NVST	TGH	Tongoa Airport
Linua, Torres Islands	Torba	NVSD	TOH	Torres Airport
Ulei, Ambrym	Malampa	NVSU	ULB	Ulei Airport
Valesdir, Epi	Shefa	NVSV	VLS	Valesdir Airport
Walaha, Ambae Island	Penama	NVSW	WLH	**Walaha Airport**

== See also ==
- Transport in Vanuatu
- List of airports by ICAO code: N#NV - Vanuatu
- Wikipedia: WikiProject Aviation/Airline destination lists: Oceania#Vanuatu
