= List of inhabited locations in Vanuatu =

Below is a partial list of populated places in Vanuatu.

== Populated places ==
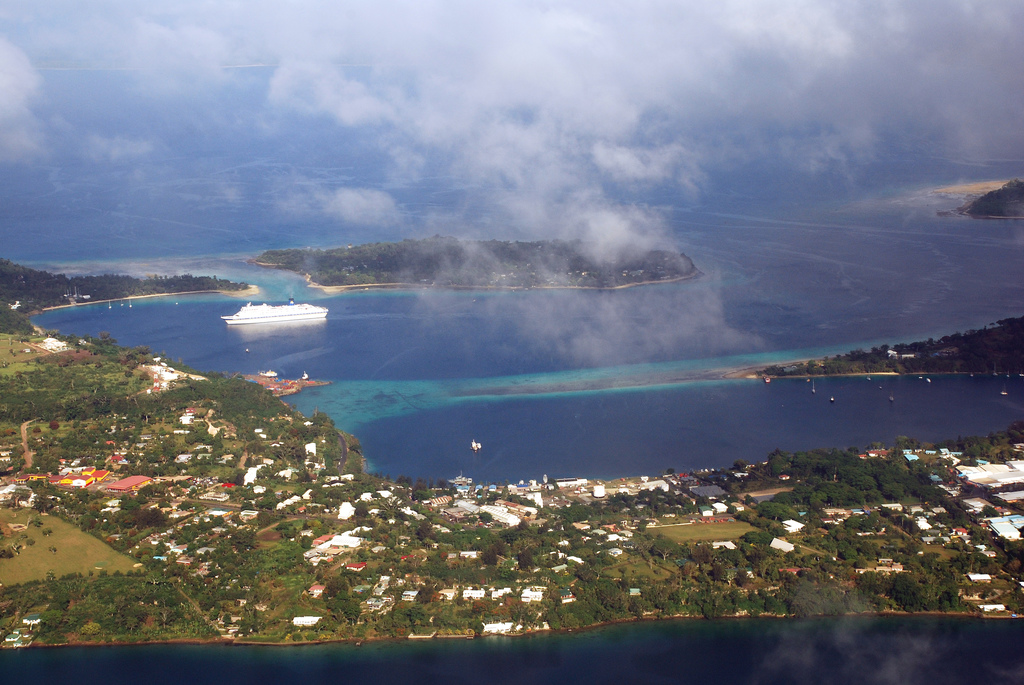
Port Vila, the Capital of Vanuatu.

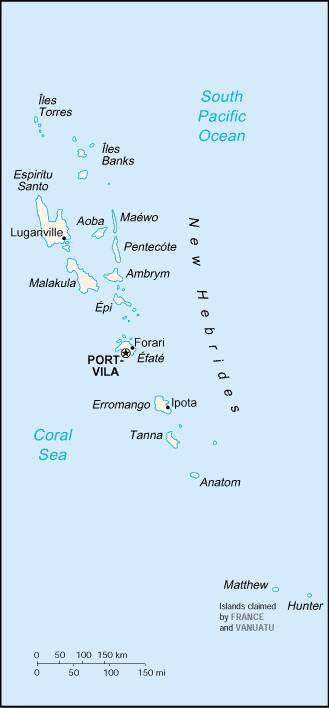
A map of Vanuatu

- Avire
- Bunlap
- Butmas
- Endu
- Forari
- Ipikil
- Ipota
- Isangel
- Lakatoro
- Lamap
- Loltong
- Longana
- Lorevilko
- Luganville
- Lenakel
- Norsup
- Port Olry
- Port Vila - Capital
- Rovo Bay
- Sola
- Sulphur Bay
- Whitesands
