= List of provinces of Vanuatu by Human Development Index =

Vanuatu sub-national HDIS

This is a list of provinces of Vanuatu by Human Development Index as of 2022.

| Rank | Region | HDI (2022) |
High human development
| 1 | Port Vila | 0.724 |
| 2 | Luganville | 0.709 |
Medium human development
| – | Vanuatu (average) | 0.614 |
| 3 | Shefa | 0.608 |
| 4 | Malampa | 0.590 |
| 5 | Sanma | 0.575 |
| 6 | Tafea | 0.565 |
| 7 | Torba | 0.554 |
| 8 | Penama | 0.552 |

== See also ==
- List of countries by Human Development Index
