= Ipikil =

- Village
- Location in Vanuatu
- Coordinates: 19°30′47″S 169°27′36″E
- Country: Vanuatu
- Province: Tafea Province
- Island: Tanna
- Time zone: UTC+11 (VUT)

Ipikil is a village nestled on Sulphur Bay on the island of Tanna in Vanuatu, set between New Guinea and Fiji.

It was once a stronghold of the John Frum movement. In April 2000, Lake Isiwi burst down the valley, destroying the village of Sulphur Bay without loss of life. The entire village had answered an urgent alarm bell from the nearby Church on the Rock, which was empty at the time, and no-one was killed. Thousands of villagers from the area officially declared themselves Christian in 2006.
