= ISO 3166-2:VU =

Entry for Vanuatu in ISO 3166-2

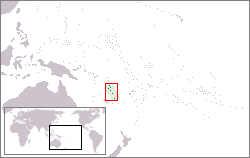
Map showing location of Vanuatu

ISO 3166-2:VU is the entry for Vanuatu in ISO 3166-2, part of the ISO 3166 standard published by the International Organization for Standardization (ISO), which defines codes for the names of the principal subdivisions (e.g., provinces or states) of all countries coded in ISO 3166-1.

Currently for Vanuatu, ISO 3166-2 codes are defined for six provinces.

Each code consists of two parts separated by a hyphen. The first part is VU, the ISO 3166-1 alpha-2 code of Vanuatu. The second part is three letters.

== Current codes ==
Subdivision names are listed as in the ISO 3166-2 standard published by the ISO 3166 Maintenance Agency (ISO 3166/MA).

Click on the button in the header to sort each column.

Code	Subdivision name (en, fr)
VU-MAP	Malampa
VU-PAM	Pénama
VU-SAM	Sanma
VU-SEE	Shéfa
VU-TAE	Taféa
VU-TOB	Torba

== See also ==
- Subdivisions of Vanuatu
- FIPS region codes of Vanuatu
