= Cyclone Dovi (2022) =

South Pacific tropical cyclone

Severe Tropical Cyclone Dovi
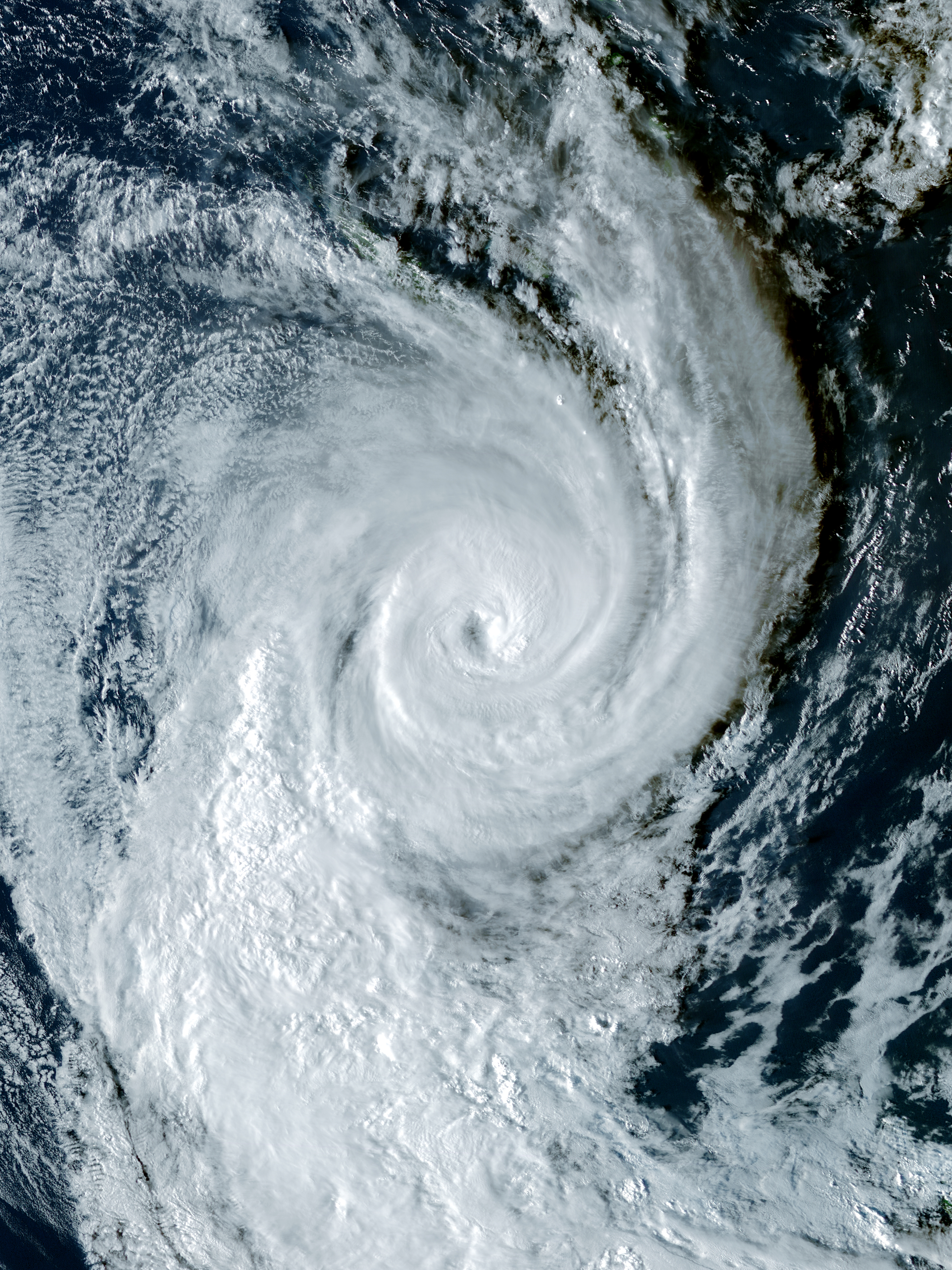
- Severe Tropical Cyclone Dovi near its peak intensity on 11 February

Meteorological history
- Formed: 8 February 2022
- Extratropical: 11 February 2022
- Dissipated: 13 February 2022

Category 4 severe tropical cyclone
- 10-minute sustained (MetService)
- Highest winds: 175 km/h (110 mph)
- Lowest pressure: 940 hPa (mbar); 27.76 inHg

Category 2-equivalent tropical cyclone
- 1-minute sustained (SSHWS/JTWC)
- Highest winds: 165 km/h (105 mph)
- Lowest pressure: 962 hPa (mbar); 28.41 inHg

Overall effects
- Fatalities: 1 indirect
- Damage: $84 million (2022 USD)
- Areas affected: Vanuatu, New Caledonia, Norfolk Island, New Zealand
- Part of the 2021–22 South Pacific cyclone season

Severe Tropical Cyclone Dovi was a powerful tropical cyclone across the Southern Pacific in February 2022. The system became the third named tropical cyclone of the 2021–22 South Pacific cyclone season. The storm first formed in the Australian basin on February 4 before crossing over into the South Pacific. The storm caused one death in New Caledonia, and several mudslides occurred in New Caledonia and Vanuatu. Dovi also caused flight cancellations and damage out of New Zealand.

== Meteorological history ==
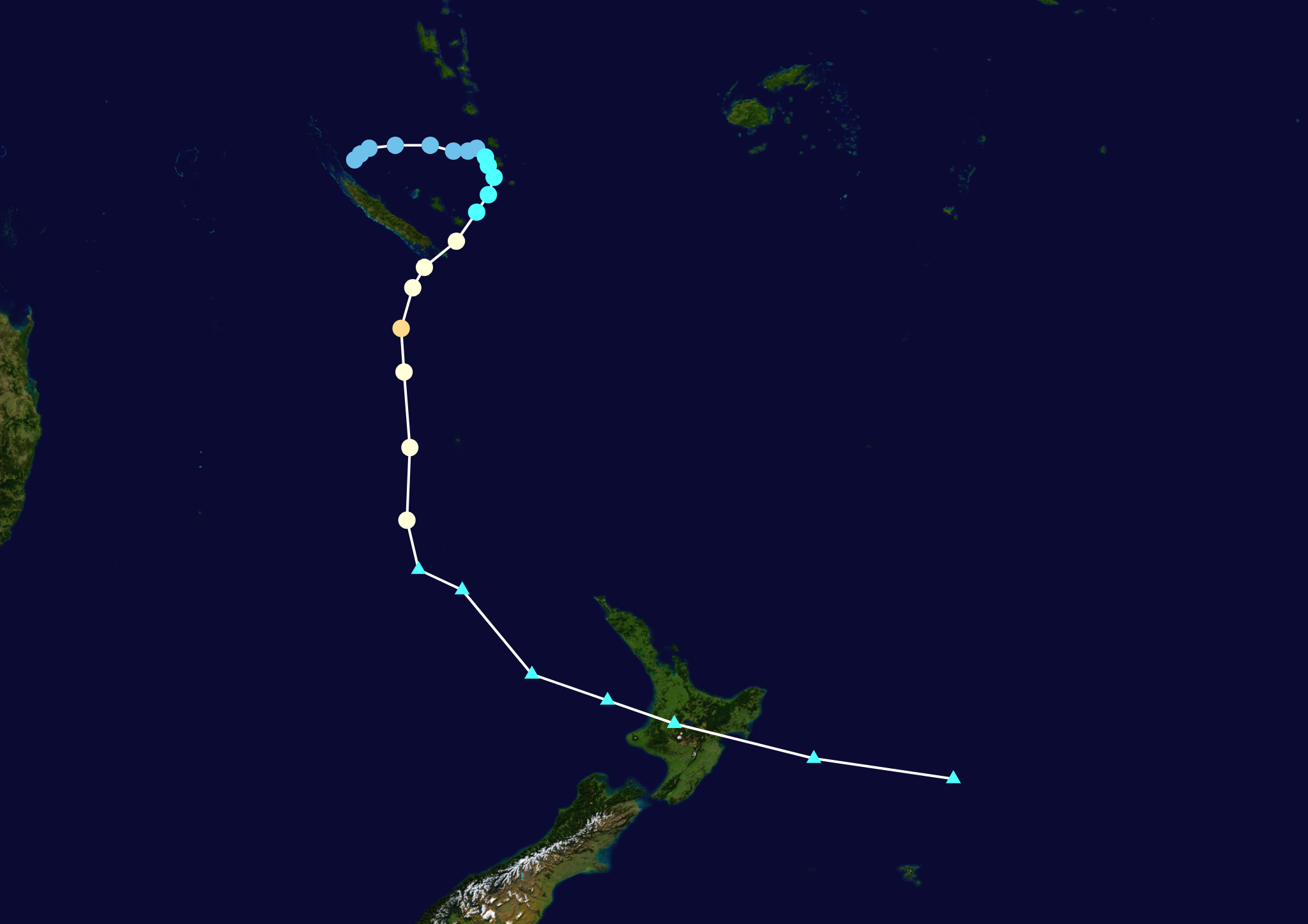
Map plotting the storm's track and intensity, according to the Saffir–Simpson scale Map key Saffir–Simpson scale Tropical depression (≤38 mph, ≤62 km/h) Tropical storm (39–73 mph, 63–118 km/h) Category 1 (74–95 mph, 119–153 km/h) Category 2 (96–110 mph, 154–177 km/h) Category 3 (111–129 mph, 178–208 km/h) Category 4 (130–156 mph, 209–251 km/h) Category 5 (≥157 mph, ≥252 km/h) Unknown Storm type Tropical cyclone Subtropical cyclone Extratropical cyclone, remnant low, tropical disturbance, or monsoon depression

On February 4, the United States Joint Typhoon Warning Center reported that a tropical disturbance, had developed within the Australian region about 1,285 km (800 mi) to the west of New Caledonia. The disturbance was starting to develop a low-level circulation, which was accompanied by fragmented atmospheric convection, along a frontal boundary that extended across the Cape York Peninsula and the Coral Sea. Over the next couple of days, the Australian Bureau of Meteorology (BoM) and the Fiji Meteorological Service (FMS) started to monitor the poorly organized system as Tropical Low 18U and Tropical Disturbance 08F, as it moved eastwards within the frontal boundary towards Vanuatu and the South Pacific basin. During February 7, the system started to slowly consolidate, as it passed to the north of New Caledonia, before the FMS classified the system as a tropical depression. At this stage, the depression was moving eastwards and was predicted to continue to move eastwards towards Fiji, however, the depression slowed down as it approached the islands of southern Vanuatu during February 8.

== Impacts ==
Dovi resulted in $84 million (2022 USD) in losses throughout Vanuatu, Norfolk Island, New Caledonia, and New Zealand.

=== Vanuatu, Norfolk Island, and New Caledonia ===
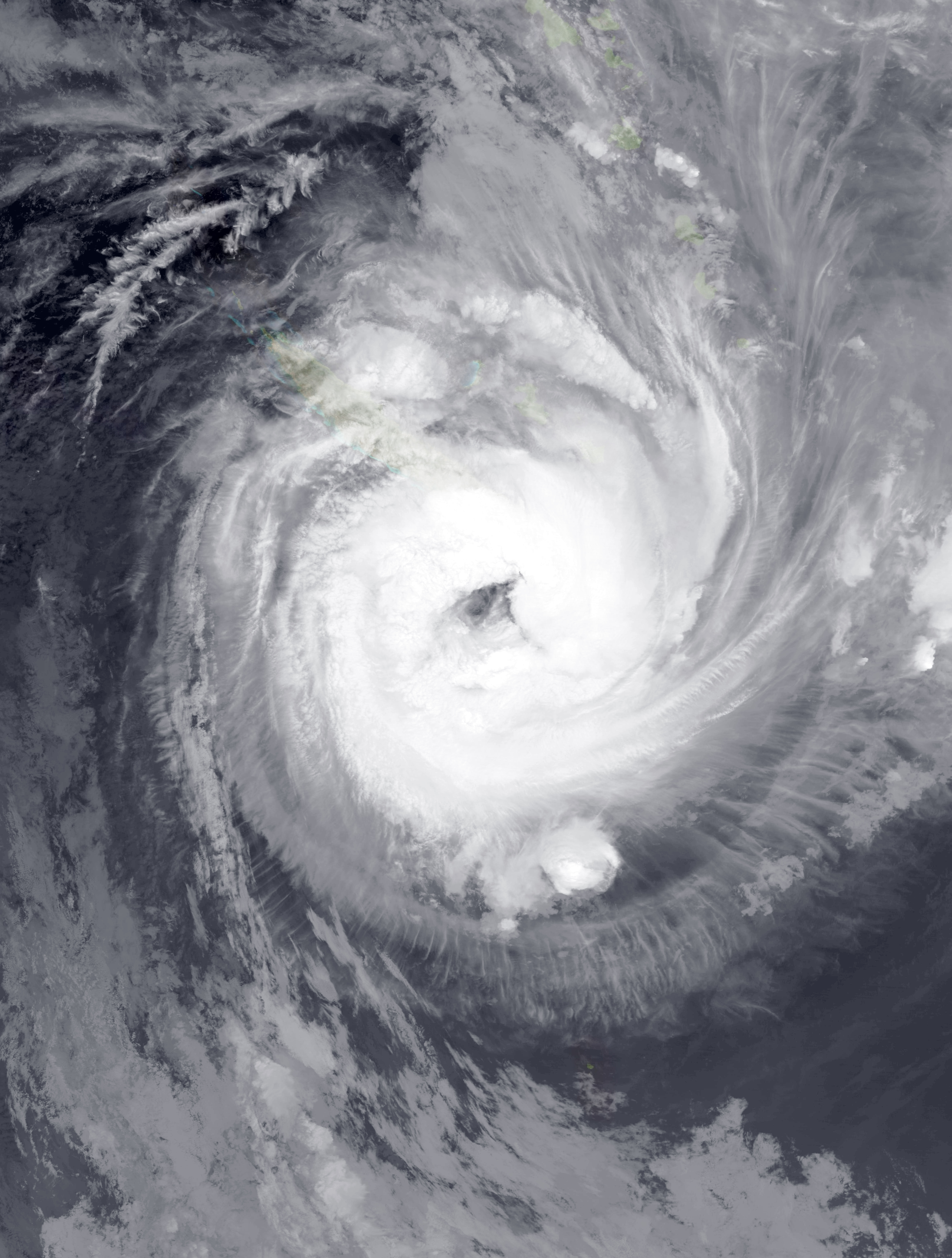
Cyclone Dovi near New Caledonia on 10 February

The Vanuatu Meteorology and Geohazards Department (VMGD) issued storm warnings for Dovi on 9 February. Schools in Shefa and Tafea provinces were closed and principals were ordered to secure equipment for the storm. Government buildings were closed around lunchtime on 9 February, as residents packed grocery stores for supplies. As Cyclone Dovi moved through Vanuatu, heavy rainfall was observed which resulted in major flash flooding. The Vanuatu Police Force evacuated several families from the Teouma Valley to shelters, after their homes were flooded. The Teouma River overflowed during the cyclone due to days of torrential rainfall. Residents in Port Vila, Efate, and other islands were affected by flooding, although exact figures on those affected and evacuated were unknown. The Erromango River overflowed and flooded areas about 196 feet (60 m) from its banks. This flooding damage crops along the banks of the river and flooded part of the regional council building. A road project funded by the World Bank between Dillon's Bay and the Ipota Airport was affected by the cyclone. Lower atmospheric pressure increased sea levels in Tafea Province simultaneously with annual high tides. A mudslide occurred along the La Colle River, where bridges were destroyed near Port Vila International Airport. Flooding was observed in the city which entered some buildings. Over 400 people nationwide had to flee to shelters due to the cyclone. Following Dovi, authorities warned of potential outbreaks of foodborne and waterborne illnesses due to the storm, encouraging families to boil water and wash fruits and vegetables prior to consumption.

On Norfolk Island, the BOM issued a tropical cyclone warning on February 11 due to the threat of strong winds and heavy rainfall from Dovi. A peak wind gust of 57 mph (92 km/h) was observed on the island as Dovi passed to the west between 11 and 12 February.

A Level 2 cyclone alert was issued on 9 February ahead of Dovi in New Caledonia. Along with this alert came a stay-at-home order and halting of activities. Flights from Air Calédonie were cancelled on 10–11 February; reception centers were set up. Schools across northern and southern New Caledonia, and the Loyalty Islands all businesses, public buildings, and schools were closed. Multiple evacuation centres were opened across the Loyalty Islands. Heavy rainfall affected the entire territory as the cyclone passed close to Le Caillou. In Yahoué, a landslide swept away and toppled a home on stilts. The mudslide also blocked a road, isolating five residences. Over 100 families were evacuated to a shelter in the territorial capital, Nouméa. Many roads in the southern part of New Caledonia were blocked by flooding, forcing motorists to be stranded for several hours. A peak wind gust of 96 mph (154 km/h) was measured on the Isle of Pines. Meanwhile, a peak rainfall accumulation of 8.26 inches (210 mm) was observed in Goro. A water release from the Yaté Dam caused at least one fatality and two injuries in southern Grande Terre on 12 February. As a result of the cyclone, a rescue alert was issued within the territory as the system pulled away from the region.

=== New Zealand ===
The MetService of New Zealand declared the extratropical remnants of Dovi a "significant weather event". Heavy rain and wind watches were put in effect for North Island. MetService issued a total of 17 storm warnings for North Island. The NZ Transport Agency warned of the closure of the Auckland Harbour Bridge, which was closed on the morning of 13 February. Vector Limited made preparations for Dovi and advised residents to keep their devices charged and to keep a power bank and torch handy. Motorists were told to avoid non-essential travel on roadways. More than 100 Air New Zealand flights were cancelled due to the storm. The extratropical remnants of Cyclone Dovi caused heavy rainfall over New Zealand, peaking at 6 inches (150 mm) in Kelburn. The national capital of Wellington measured its wettest February-day in recorded history, with 3.18 inches (81 mm) of precipitation reported at Wellington Airport, which was also the second-wettest day in the city since 1960. Protesters over vaccine mandates at the grounds of parliament buildings in Wellington were affected by the cyclone and covered the lawns outside parliament buildings with hay to prevent mud. Ferries across the Cook Strait were cancelled due to the threat of strong wind gusts and large swells. A peak wind gust of 96 mph (154 km/h) was reported at the strait. A large mudslide on State Highway 2 near Melling blocked a northbound lane of the Highway and pushed a nearby home to the edge of a cliff; State Highway 1 was also closed due to mudslides. Another landslide covered a narrow road in the Aro Valley, while a home in the valley was flooded and a mudslide occurred behind a nearby home. Residents in the area were seen placing sandbags during the middle of the night due to the cyclone. A vehicle was trapped underneath a landslide in Plimmerton; four households were forced to evacuate due to the landslide. A wind gust of 91 mph (146 km/h) was measured at Mount Kaukau. A home was crushed by a mudslide and downed tree in Evans Bay. Another landslide in Wadestown toppled a retaining wall onto a residence and a house was evacuated on Houghton Bay. Mudslides were also observed in Hornsey and Melrose. A landfall in the area was closed due to a combination of rockslides and flooding, while streets in Mākara and Ohariu were submerged. Deep water flooding in Carterton trapped a man in his vehicle, who required rescue but was unscathed. First responders received more than 300 emergency calls due to severe weather from Dovi, mostly related to downed trees and power lines. A man in Raglan was injured after a tree fell onto his vehicle and was taken to Waikato Hospital in serious condition. Another large tree fell onto a truck near Hamilton with three people inside who were left uninjured. Flooding overtopped the banks of the Waipoua River, combined with downed trees causing road closures in Wairarapa. Street flooding was also observed throughout Masterton. The Waihenga Bridge connecting Featherston and Martinborough was closed as a result of rising water levels. In the former city, residents were placed under a water boil advisory after the Boar Bush Reservoir was contaminated. Backflow issues were also reported in Carterton.

In Taranaki, surface flooding forced road closures on state highways 45 and 1. Multiple households across the region were affected by power outages in Hāwera and New Plymouth. A vaccination clinic in Hāwera was closed due to a power outage. A large pōhutukawa tree fell and blocked a highway south of Ōakura, taking 15 to 20 people to clear the road. High volumes of emergency calls overwhelmed volunteer first responders in South Taranaki; crews were sent from New Plymouth to relieve these volunteers from work. A cowshed in South Taranaki was flooded by the storm. The lee breakwater at Port Taranaki was shut down to the public, however, crowds still gathered nearby to view large swells. Rocks and other debris were scattered across a parking lot in the area and minor damage was reported to jetties and boat ramps. A wave tower at Port Taranaki was left unrepairable after the cyclone and a 164 ft (50 m) exclusion zone was placed around the structure in order to create a safe zone for demolition. In Piha, plastic cladding was shredded at a major construction site. At the peak of the cyclone, over 50,000 customers lost electricity across the Auckland Region. Local emergency agencies received 300 reports of fallen trees, 240 of which had been attended to by 14 February. A total of 12 crews were deployed to responds to major storm-related incidents such as blocked roads and those involving vehicles and homes. A wind gust of 108 mph (174 km/h) was observed on Great Barrier Island during the cyclone. Several COVID-19 testing sites were either moved indoors or closed, the Auckland Zoo ceased operations, and ferries were cancelled for roughly an hour. Several boats in Russell and Opua of the Northland Region were broken free from their moorings. Police in the region received 35 calls of incidents; trees were downed which damaged homes in Kauri and Whangārei. More than 5,000 customers lost electricity in the area due to Dovi.

On New Zealand's South Island, severe storms from Dovi contributed to the wettest February in the island's history. Flooding, downed trees and blocked roads were reported in Marlborough District. Between Kaikōura and Waipara, State Highway 1 was closed off due to a combination of mudslides and flooding; detours were set up. Dovi and previous severe weather events impacted farmland on South Island, causing damage to infrastructure, paddocks, and barn structures. Bales of winter supplementary feed were swept away during flooding which left many crops underwater. Hundreds of residents north of Westport were stranded after State Highway 67 was blocked due to infrastructure damage and landslides; aid was delivered to the area by helicopter. A preliminary damage estimate of NZ$54.8 million {US$36.3 million) was reported by the Insurance Council of New Zealand.

== Aftermath ==
The Government of New Zealand classified Cyclone Dovi as an adverse weather event and allocated $200,000 of funding for relief efforts. Waipa District council worked to clear trees, which potentially cost up to $30,000.

== See also ==
- Tropical cyclones in 2022
- Weather of 2022
- Cyclone Zelia (2011)
- Cyclone Lusi (2014)
- Cyclone Donna (2017)
- Cyclone Hola (2018)
- Cyclone Gabrielle (2023)
