= Anatom Airport =

Airport in Inyeug, Vanuatu

Anatom Airport Aneityum Airport
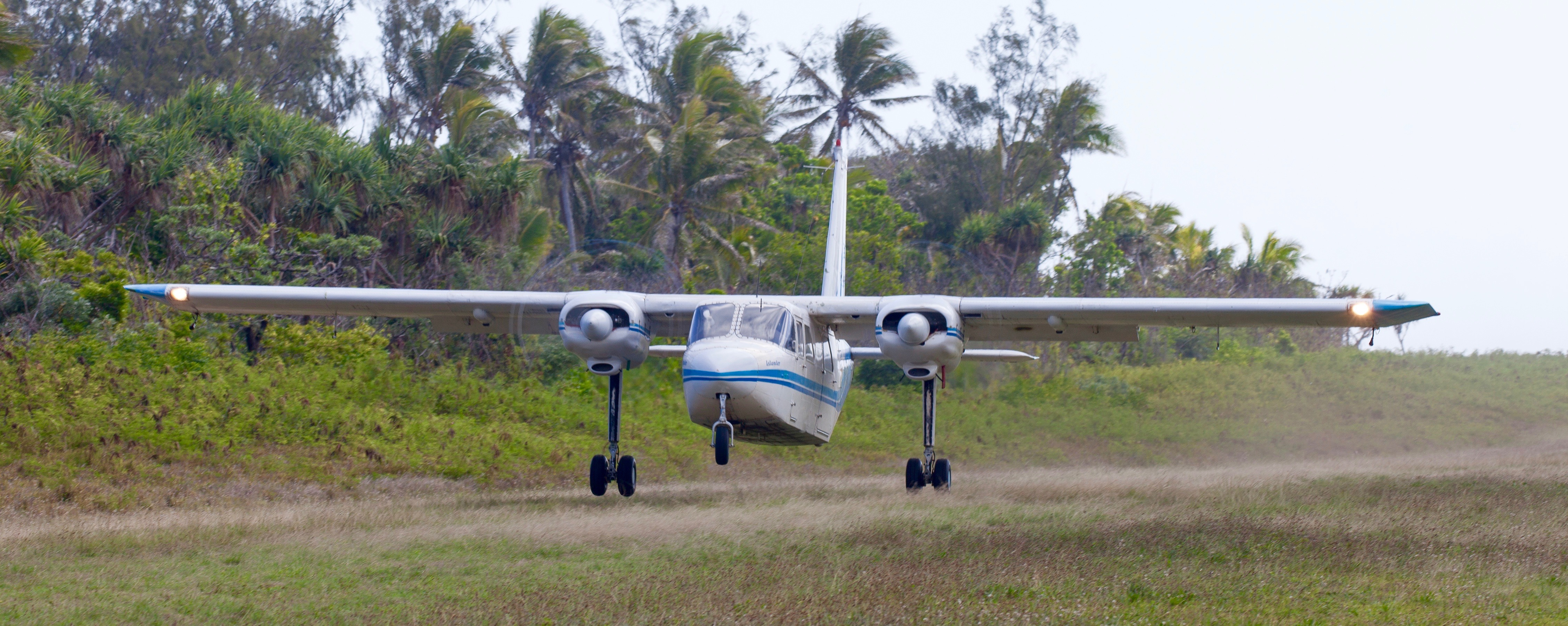
- Unity Airlines Britten-Norman Islander landing at Aneityum Airport (2015)
- IATA: AUY; ICAO: NVVA

Summary
- Airport type: Public
- Serves: Anatom (Aneityum), Taféa, Vanuatu
- Location: Inyeug
- Elevation AMSL: 7 ft (2.1 m)
- Coordinates: 20°14′57″S 169°46′17″E

Map
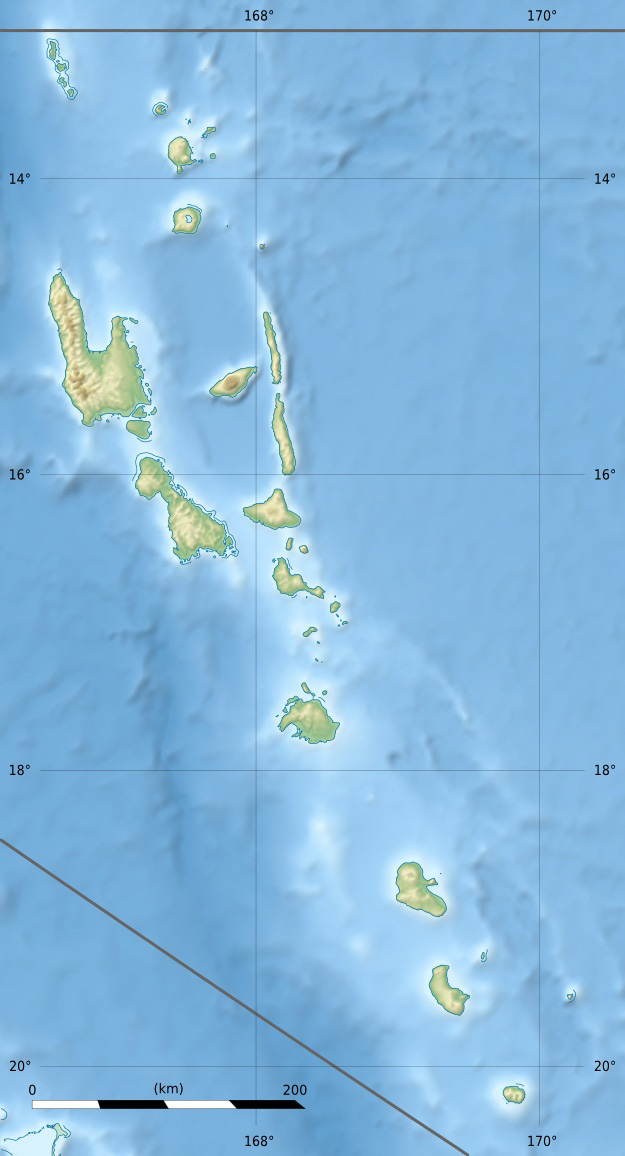
- Location of airport in Vanuatu

Runways
Direction	Length		Surface
Direction	m	ft	Surface
	610	2,001	grass

Anatom Airport (IATA: AUY, ICAO: NVVA), also known as Aneityum Airport, is an airfield serving the island of Aneityum, in the Taféa province in Vanuatu. The airfield is actually located on the smaller Inyeug island.

== Facilities ==
The airport resides at an elevation of 7 feet (2 m) above mean sea level. It has one runway which is 610 metres (2,001 ft) in length.
