= DLY =

DLY may refer to:

- DLY, the IATA airport code for Dillon's Bay Airport, Taféa, Vanuatu
- DLY, the National Rail station code for Dalry railway station, North Ayrshire, Scotland
