= Longana =

- Village
- Location in Vanuatu
- Coordinates: 15°18′20″S 167°58′2″E
- Country: Vanuatu
- Province: Penama Province
- Island: Ambae

Area
  - Total: 50 km^{2} (19 sq mi)
- Time zone: UTC+11 (VUT)

Longana is a village located on the eastern part of Ambae island in Penama Province, Vanuatu.

It covers land area of approximately 50 square kilometres (19 sq mi).

== Saratamata ==
Saratamata, the headquarters of Penama province, is on this part of the island. A plan has been proposed by the provincial Government to develop this area into a town.

== Transportation ==
The village is served by Longana Airport, IATA code LOD.
