= Redcliffe Airport (Vanuatu) =

Airport in South Ambae, Vanuatu

- IATA: RCL; ICAO: NVSR

Summary
- Airport type: Public
- Serves: Aoba Island, Penama, Vanuatu
- Location: South Ambae
- Elevation AMSL: 36 ft / 11 m
- Coordinates: 15°28′S 167°50′E

Map
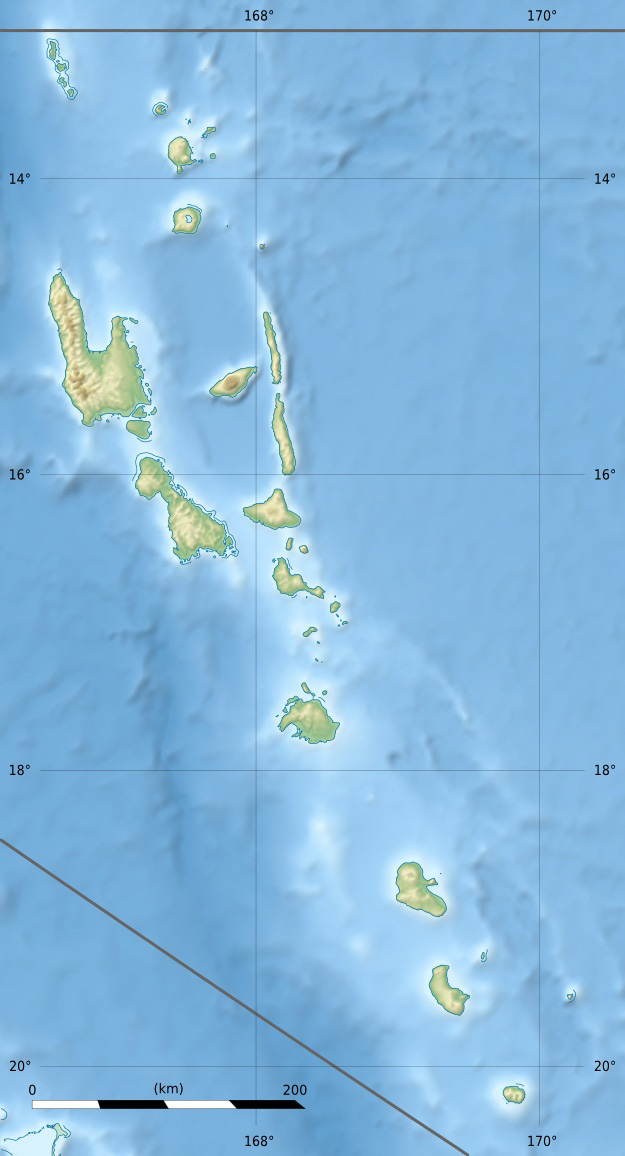
- Location of airport in Vanuatu

Runways
Direction	Length		Surface
Direction	m	ft	Surface
	660	2,165

Redcliffe Airport is one of three local airports on the island of Ambae, part of Vanuatu. (IATA: RCL, ICAO: NVSR)

Redcliffe is secondary to Vanuatu's international airport, Bauerfield.

Its runway length is 2,230 ft. and its runway elevation is 36 ft.
