= Vete Manung =

Island in Vanuatu

Goat Island
Native name: Vete Manung
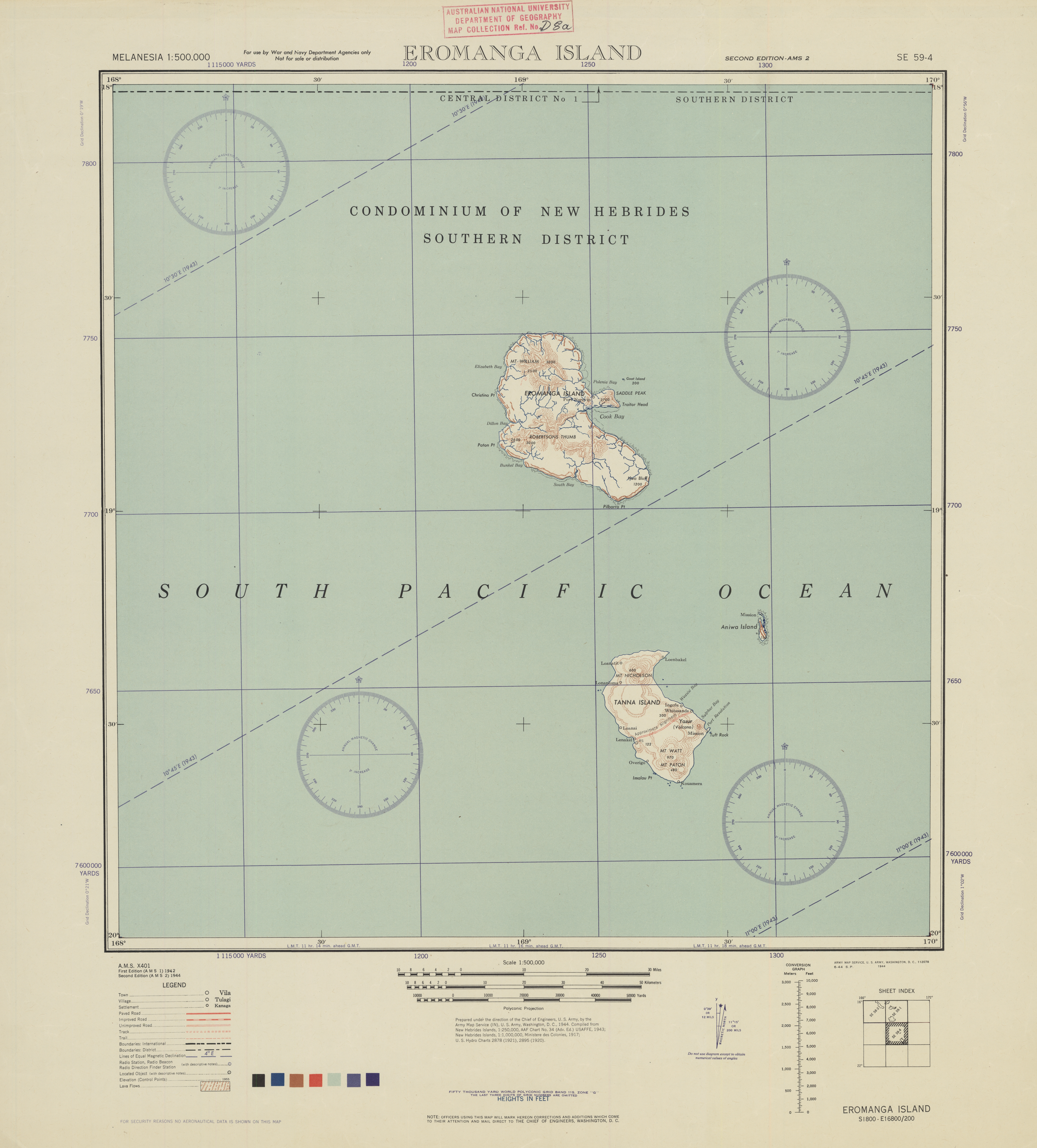
- Goat Island on map sheet
- Interactive map of Goat Island

Geography
- Location: Pacific Ocean
- Coordinates: 18°42′00″S 169°16′59.50″E
- Archipelago: Vanuatu
- Area: 0.12 km^{2} (0.046 sq mi)
- Highest elevation: 91 m (299 ft)

Administration
- Vanuatu
- Province: Tafea Province

Demographics
- Population: 0 (2015)
- Ethnic groups: None

Vete Manung, also Vetemanu, formerly Goat Island, Île Rocher, Île de la Chèvre or La Chèvre, is a small uninhabited island in Tafea Province of Vanuatu in the Pacific Ocean. Vete Manung Island is located 5.6 km northeast of Pointe Bodiroua on the north-east coast of Erromango Island.

== Geography ==
Goat Island lies 150 km south of Port-Vila.
