= Manaro Voui =

Volcano in Vanuatu

- Manaro Vui
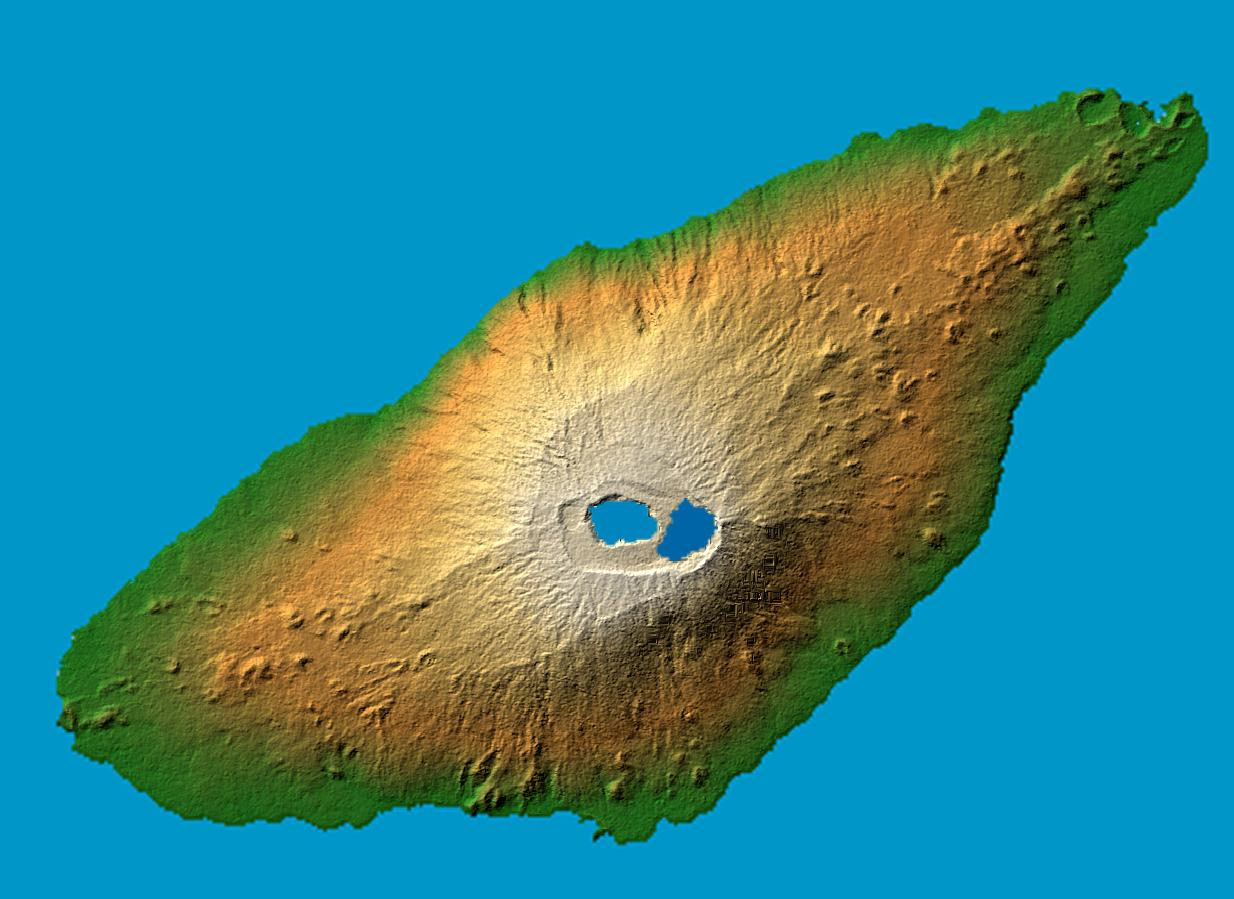
- False color (elevation) and computed shadows map of Manaro Voui

Highest point
- Elevation: 1,496 m (4,908 ft)
- Prominence: 1,496 m (4,908 ft)
- Listing: Ribu
- Coordinates: 15°23′24.21″S 167°49′49.63″E

Geography
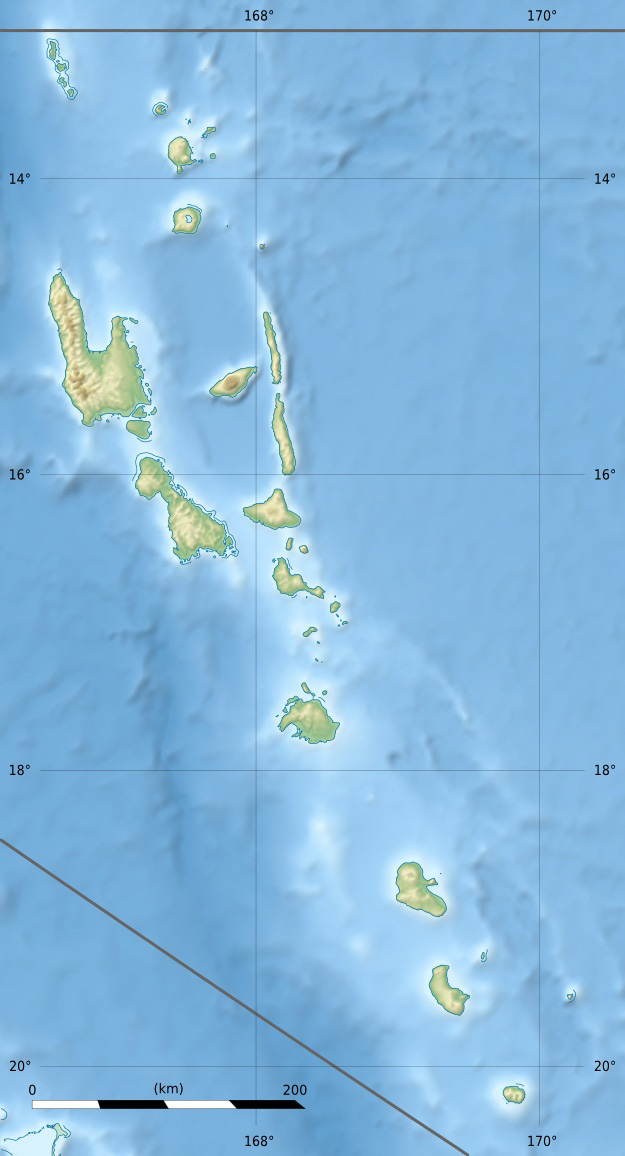
- Location within Vanuatu
- Location: Ambae Island, Vanuatu

Geology
- Mountain type: Shield volcano
- Last eruption: January 7, 2026 (ongoing)

Manaro Voui, or Manaro Vui, is a shield volcano whose emergent portion is known as the island of Ambae in Vanuatu. The summit is 1,496 metres (4,908 ft) above sea level and about 3,900 m (12,800 ft) above the sea floor. According to indigenous custom Chief Virenaliu Paul Vuhu, the summit's valley and lakes are considered the "sacred place and paradise" where they believe after death, their spirits go to live happily ever after'. The Vanuatu Meteorology and Geohazards Department maintains a live webcam and seismological chart.

== Name ==
Volcanologists use the term 'volcano' to refer to either a "vent in the surface of the Earth through which magma and associated gases and ash erupt", or "the form or structure (usually conical) that is produced by the ejected material."

Aoba is the name of the volcano used by Volcano World in their world database in their list of Vanuatu's 9 volcanoes. Manaro is the name they use to refer to the summit crater, which contains multiple vents and lakes.

Aoba is also the name used by Smithsonian Institution's Global Volcanism Program in their list of 14 volcanoes on Vanuatu. Manaro Ngoru and Lake Voui are the names they use for the summit craters. In a 2005 report, The Bulletin of the Global Volcanism Network stated that Aoba is "referred to locally as Manaro or Lombenben"

Aoba is also the name used in The World Factbook written by United States Central Intelligence Agency.

Aoba is also the name used in a 2017 peer reviewed article in the journal Science, whose lead author works at NASA, and holds a joint appointment at the University of California, Los Angeles.

Lombenben is the name used on a 2017 map published by Vanuatu's National Disaster Management Office.

Lombenben is also the name used by the daily newspaper Vanuatu Daily Post in recent articles.

Manaro Voui is the name used in various articles in 2017 by Vanuatu Digest, Reuters, Associated Press and Radio New Zealand.

Manaro is the name used in Encyclopædia Britannica in their entry on Aoba.

Manaro is also the name used in 2017 articles in Vanuatu Daily Post and The Guardian for the volcano (cinder cone) in the middle of the lake on top of Mount Lombenben.

== Volcanic activity ==
The volcanic mountain is one of the most dangerously active volcanoes in the world; its last eruption was recorded in 2017. Previously, up to 5,000 people living near the volcano have had to be evacuated for their safety.

The volcano's recent history includes eruptions in 1966, 2005 and 2016. In general, the new activity can happen anywhere on Ambae, but with highest likelihood in the rift zone, a long 2 km (1.2 mi) wide region that runs the length of the island and contains the summit.

=== September 2017 Eruptions ===
| Date | Summary |
|---|---|
| mid-September 2017 | New eruptions began in the summit crater below the surface of Lake Voui, leading the Vanuatu Meteorology and Geohazards Department (VMGD) to raise the Alert Level to 3. |
| 22 September | VMGD raised the Alert Level to 4 upon observing lava breech the surface of Lake Voui for the first time, as the underwater dome grew into a new volcanic island in the summit crater. |
| 25 September | Vanuatu Government's Council of Ministers declared a State of Emergency on Ambae island in response to the eruption of Manaro Voui volcano. |
| 28 September | The government of Vanuatu ordered the complete evacuation of Ambae's 11,000 residents (evacuation map). |
| 1 October | The VMGD advised of a possible stabilization of volcanic activity, but kept the Alert Level at 4. |
| 4 October | All but a handful of the island's 11,500 residents had been evacuated to neighboring islands through grassroots efforts largely initiated and carried out by Ni-Vanuatu. The Alert Level remained at 4 (out of 5). |
| 6 October | VMGD lowered the Alert Level from 4 to 3. They reported that the 'danger zone' is within 3 km (1.9 mi) from the vent in Lake Voui, and stated that in this area, flying rock and volcanic gases may be present. |
| 7 October | The lava flow down the new cinder cone island and into the lake had stopped and measured seismic energy was decreasing. Later that day, it was reported that only 15 Ambaen residents remained on the island. |
| 10 October | The government of Vanuatu extended by two weeks the State of Emergency, allowing the National Disaster Management Office to carry out an expanded assessment of the island that will cover the state of the villages and properties including houses and gardens. |

=== 2018 eruption ===
After residents were allowed to return to Ambae Island, Manaro Voui once again began erupting with heavy ashfalls on the island in late March 2018; Volcanic Alert Level 3 was instituted on 19 March. The ashfalls were severe enough, but coupled with rains, made the ash heavy and wet enough that roofs collapsed and even tree limbs were brought down by the weight of the heavy, wet ash. By April, around 750 residents out of 13,000 had been rendered homeless by the volcanic ash and landslides, and Vanuatu government declared a mandatory evacuation, which was met with resistance. The ashfall decreased over the following months, but the eruption picked up again in July. 16 July saw a heavy ashfall, prompting people to use umbrellas and turn on artificial lighting in late afternoon. All schools on Ambae were closed the following week. The government proclaimed a state of emergency, and called for an immediate evacuation of all Ambae residents to Maewo Island.

=== December 2025 emissions ===
During late November to early December 2025, satellite imagery showed emissions coming from Manaro Voui.

=== 2026 ===
The volcano erupted on 26 August.

== Ceremonial offerings ==
To "quieten the fire of Lake Voui", a highly valued animal (pig) was slaughtered, and food, meats and mats were released into the waters from the shores of Lake Voui as an offering to Kelevu, the custodian of the lake, during a lakeside kastom ceremony around 20 September 2017, conducted by delegation of high-ranking Ambaen kastom chiefs and led by North Ambae Paramount Chief Tari One of Ambanga Village.

== Lakes ==
There are three warm freshwater crater lakes on the volcano, near its peak: Manaro Ngoru, Vui (Voui) and Manaro Lakua. Vui, the inner crater, contains 50 million cubic metres of water.
