= Butmas =

- Village
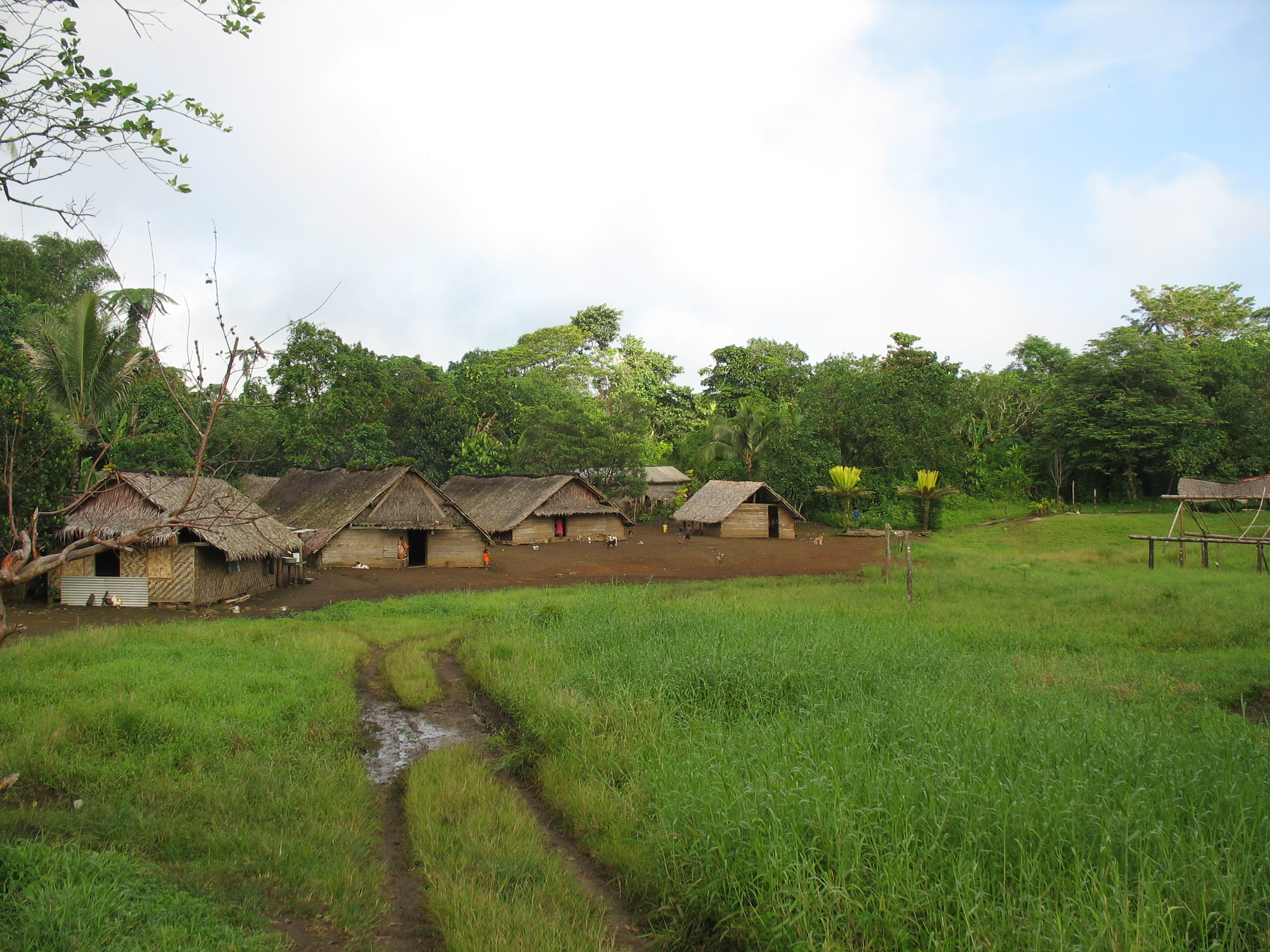
- Butmas

- Location in Vanuatu
- Coordinates: 15°22′03″S 167°00′06″E
- Country: Vanuatu
- Province: Sanma Province
- Island: Espiritu Santo
- Elevation: 500 m (1,600 ft)

Population (2009)
  - Total: 100
- Time zone: UTC+11 (VUT)

Butmas is a small community in the island nation of Vanuatu, home to the families of six local clan lineages. The community is composed of around 100 villagers, 50 of which are children attending the local primary school. The village speaks a local dialect, Butmas-Tur (one of 5 East Santo languages).

== Location ==
The village is located on the island of Espiritu Santo, Vanuatu's largest island, and geographically the village is quite central in the interior of the island at a relatively high altitude in relation to the surrounding plain areas.

== Population ==
Because it is located above 500 meters in elevation the village attracts much rain and the area is home to a local rainforest that remains free from logging and plays a large role in survival of the people. Living at high altitude also inhibits the growth of many traditional local food crops that the people rely on for sustenance. Thus the population is quite nomadic, moving between gardens at lower elevations and the village above which accounts for the rough population figure given previously. There are 93 individuals that refer to the village at Butmas as their home and another 22 individuals who refer to their garden houses as their permanent homes, though they have houses in the Butmas village and their children attend the school there.

Since the village comprises families from a number of clans there is in theory more than one chief in the village. However the chief of Butmas clan, chief Lolos, is acknowledged as the traditional village leader as he is the chief of the ground on which the clans have come together to live.

The predominant religion of the locals is Christianity with 90.00% of the population declaring themselves as such (Evangelical 41.00%). The rest of the population follows local religions.

== Economy ==
The villagers rely mostly on agriculture and gardening for both sustenance and income generation. The major crops are kava, taro, yams, cabbage, banana, corn, pumpkin, sweet potato, and cucumber. Apart from gardening, hunting plays a very important part in their diet. Their main sources of protein are pig, chicken, cows, river prawns and eel fish, with these supplemented by fruit bat and a number of local birds.
