= Futuna Airport =

Airport in Vanuatu

- IATA: FTA; ICAO: NVVF

Summary
- Airport type: Public
- Serves: Futuna, Taféa, Vanuatu
- Coordinates: 19°30′59″S 170°13′55″E

Map
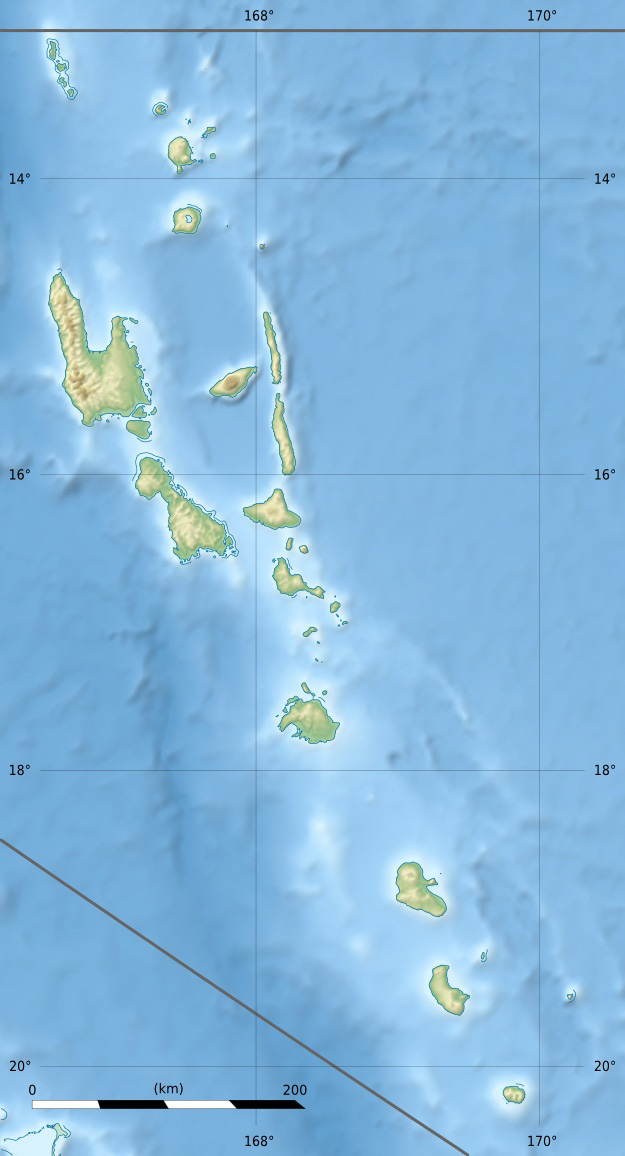
- Location of airport in Vanuatu

Runways
Direction	Length		Surface
Direction	m	ft	Surface
	579	1.899

Futuna Airport (IATA: FTA, ICAO: NVVF) is an airfield on the island of Futuna, in the Taféa province in Vanuatu.
