= Ipota Airport =

Airport in Ipota, Vanuatu

- IATA: IPA; ICAO: NVVI

Summary
- Airport type: Public
- Serves: Erromango, Taféa, Vanuatu
- Location: Ipota
- Elevation AMSL: 23 ft / 7 m
- Coordinates: 18°51′23″S 169°17′00″E

Map
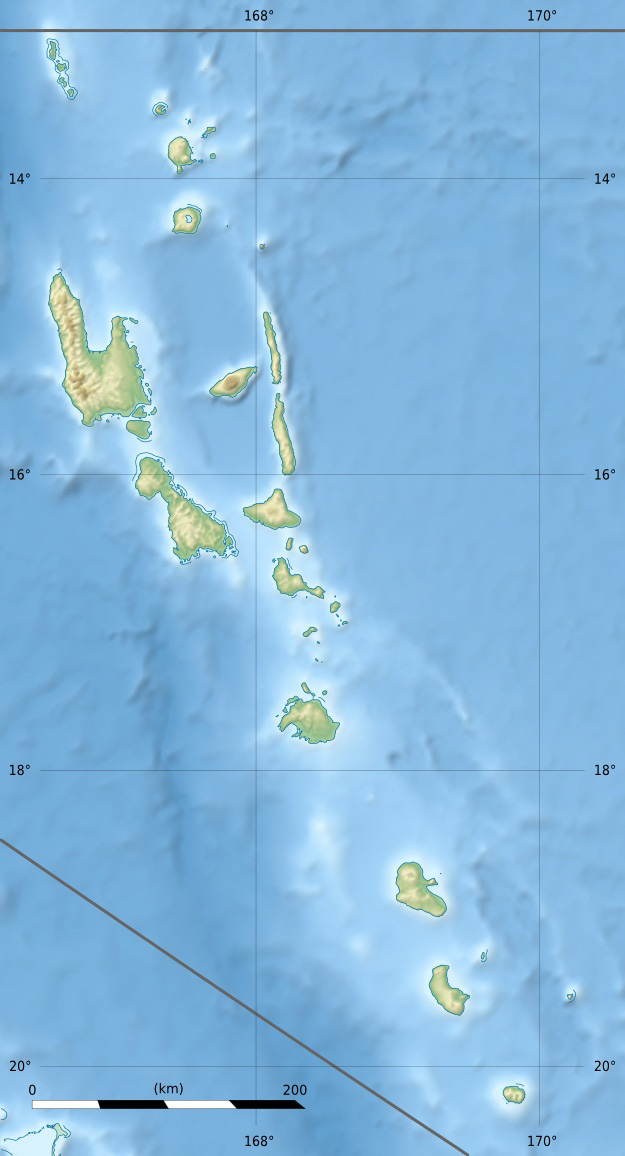
- Location of airport in Vanuatu

Runways
| Direction | Length | | Surface |
| Direction | m | ft | Surface |
|---|---|---|---|
| | 930 | 3,051 |

Ipota Airport (IATA: IPA, ICAO: NVVI) is an airfield near Ipota on the island of Erromango, in the Taféa province in Vanuatu. It is one of two airfields in the island, the other being Dillon's Bay Airport in the west.

== Facilities ==
The airport resides at an elevation of 23 feet (7 m) above mean sea level. It has one runway which is 930 metres (3,051 ft) in length.
