= Kanegai =

Kanegai is a surname. Notable people with the surname include:

- Bruce Kanegai (born c. 1948), teacher and contestant on Survivor: Panama
- Nadia Kanegai (fl. 1982), Vanautu politician and entrepreneur
