= Futuna (island of Vanuatu) =

Island in Vanuatu

- Interactive map of Futuna

Geography
- Location: South Pacific Ocean
- Coordinates: 19°32′S 170°13′E
- Archipelago: Vanuatu
- Area: 11 km^{2} (4.2 sq mi)
- Highest elevation: 666 m (2185 ft)
- Highest point: Tatafou

Administration
- Vanuatu
- Province: Tafea Province
- Largest settlement: Imounga

Demographics
- Population: 613 (2016)
- Ethnic groups: Melanesians

Futuna is an island in the Tafea province of Vanuatu. It is the easternmost island in the country.

== Geography ==
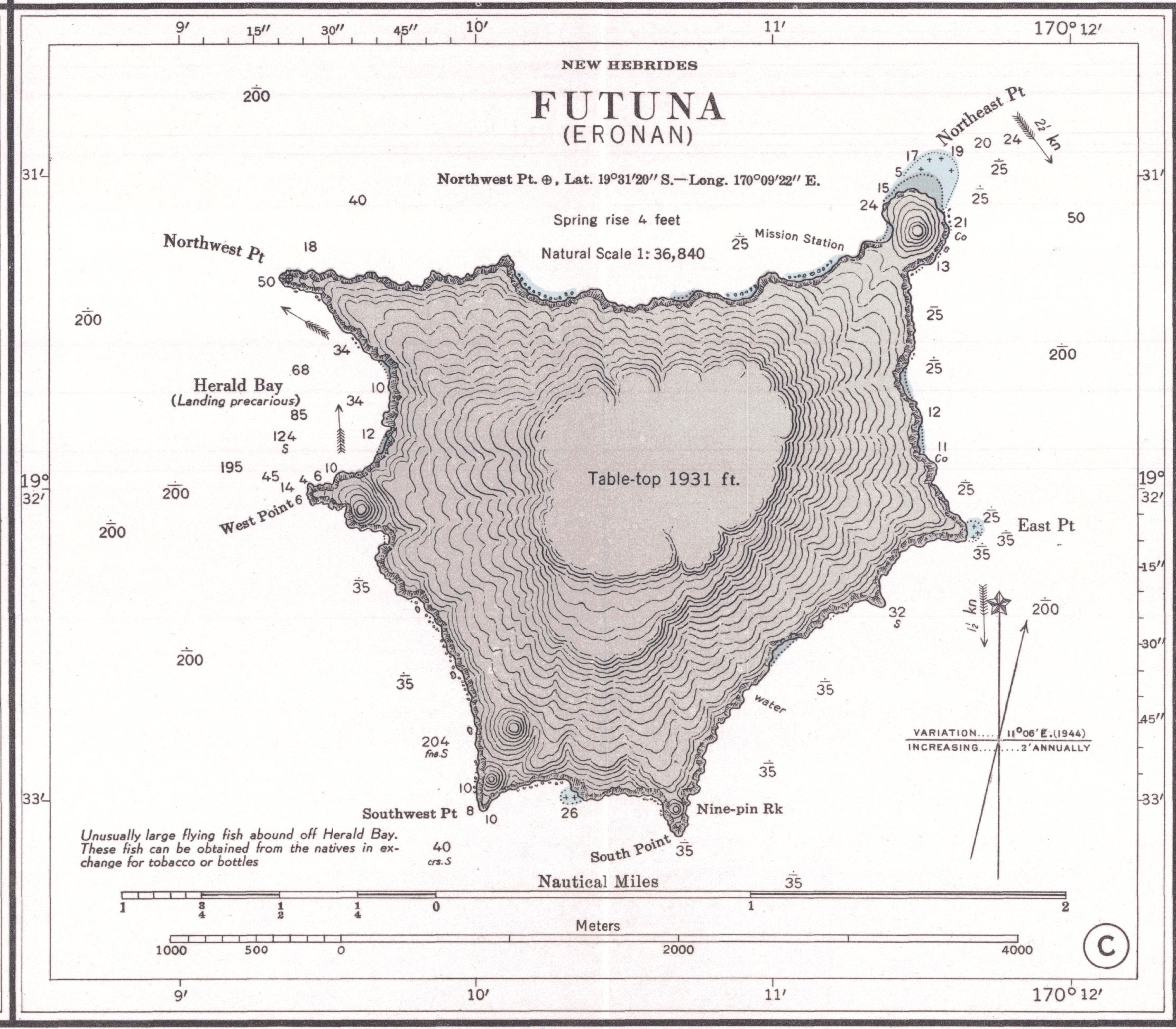
Nautical chart of Futuna island

It was formed by the uplift of an underwater volcano, which last erupted in the Pleistocene, at least 11,000 years ago. The volcano reaches a height of 666 m (2,185 ft) and gives the island an area of 11 km^{2} (4.2 sq mi). The island is sometimes called West Futuna to distinguish it from Futuna Island, Wallis and Futuna, and also can be known Erronan by its island neighbour, Tanna. Although it is part of the Melanesian country of Vanuatu it is considered to be a Polynesian outlier. To the immediate east of the island the seafloor occupies a 3.6 km (2.2 mi) deep and 25–30 km (16–19 mi) wide intra-arc sedimentary basin called the Futuna Trough that separates the island from Anwai and Tanna islands to the nor-east and Aneityum island to the south-east.

=== Geology ===
The top of the Pliocene part of the basaltic andesite volcano is overlain by a 4 km^{2} (1.5 sq mi) mid-Pleistocene cap of limestone called the Tanafu Plateau. This has sinkholes up to 15 m (49 ft) deep in a karst landscape. The uplift of the volcano that was last active 1.8 ± 0.05 Ma ago, has resulted in seven, now on land, coral reef steps at the islands sea margin commencing from 520,000 years ago but effectively ceasing about 210,000 years ago. The Tanafu Plateau is the 160 m (520 ft) thick deposits of the lagoon bottom of this original reef.

=== Ecology ===
The island has a cover of rainforest and is surrounded by coral reefs with typical South Pacific island ecosystems.

== History ==
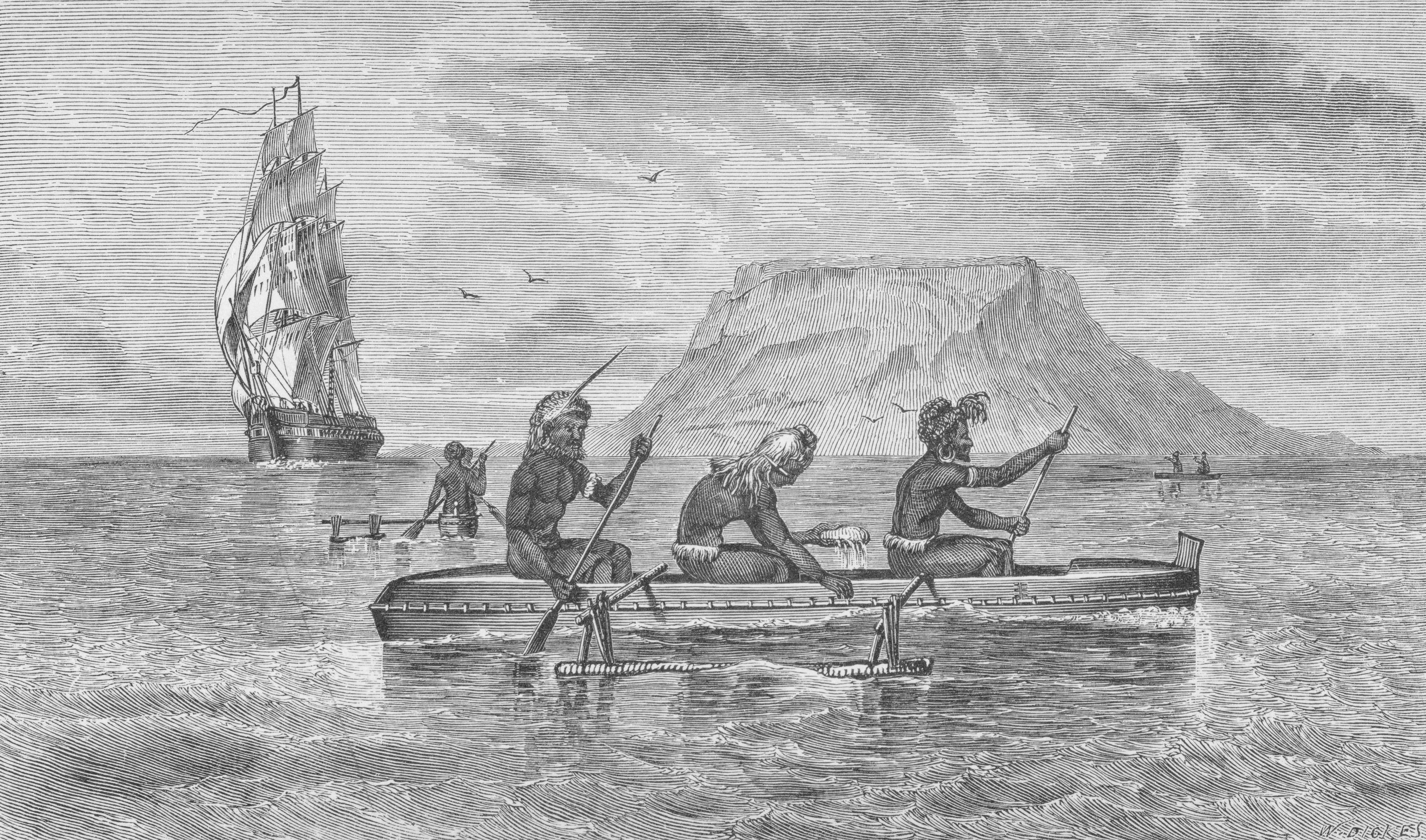
1863 engraving of the natives of Futuna

Futuna is sometimes said to be the 'Gateway' to the gospel in Vanuatu, the first island where its inhabitants converted to Christianity. During the late 1800s several missionaries lived on this island for the purpose of preaching the gospel to the natives, and in coordination with missionaries living on other neighbouring islands tried to introduce western living and influence for improvement of the well-being of its people. Notable missionaries that have lived on this island are Rev. Joseph Copeland, and medical doctor William Gunn.

Rev. Joseph Copeland had lived on the island for 10 years, from 1866, before he moved on to Tanna. Dr. William Gunn had lived on the island from 1883 to 1917. He is more well known to the local Futunese, as he had made a bigger impact to the establishments of churches around the island, and had brought many to be converted and baptised. He has also made significant contributions to the translation of bible and hymns from English to the Futunese language, and documented many Futunese customs and cultural practices in his book "The Gospel in Futuna".

== Population ==
The island has a population of 535 according to the 2009 census. There are currently 5 main villages on Futuna Island:

- Iasoa
- Ipao
- Matangi (Consists of Iraro, Marae, Itavai and Iakana)
- Ihsia
- Imounga

The main village is Imounga, in the northwest. Ipao, in the northeast, is just west of the airport. The island has ten regions: Iraro, Itapapa, Itapasiesi, Matangi, Matowei, Nabao, Nariari, Rakaoroa, Serinao, and Tchinaroa.

The island also have several Futunese diaspora communities living in other islands such as main island Efate, Tanna, Aneityum and Espiritu Santo.

== Transportation ==
The island is served by its only domestic airport, Futuna Airport, which requires passengers to transit from Tanna. The airport operates on 2 flights a week. The island also has a small shipping dock at Herald Bay, where cargo ships and ferry travel every couple of months.

The irregularity of the shipping boat visits has been an inconvenience to the communities needing to ship various goods between the Tafea islands. The current frequency of ship travels has decreased compared to past ship travels during missionary years (1800-1900), where it is known for ships to travel to Futuna twice a month. During the missionary years, missionaries living on other Tafea islands were the cause for much of the shipping traffic, with goods, letters, persons exchanged/transported between islands frequently.

== Education ==
The island has a school located in the village of Ihsia. Previously known as Ihsia Secondary School, the school changed its name in 2015 to Edward Nipake Natapei Memorial School in honor of famous politician, Edward Nipake Natapei.

The school offers education from Year 1 to Year 7 as part of its primary school education; and Year 8 to Year 10 as part of its secondary.

== Music and Dance ==
Fatuana group performing a dance at the Festival dei Cuori, Italy, 2009.

=== Music ===
The inhabitants of the island have a style of hymn singing, established by 19th century missionaries, which is distinctive among Pacific islands. Futuna has a rich history in 'kastom songs', traditional songs that have been passed down from generation to generation.

These songs may contain stories of real persons, events or myths. Some of the 'kastom songs' share historical events such as 'Tahfe Tiatea itoga (The Queensland song). This song tells the story several Futunese who were recruited as farm labourers during the 'blackbirding' period, in particular, several were recruited to work in Bundaberg, Maryborough and Mackay.

During that same period, more 'kastom songs' were created based on the labourers who also visited neighbouring Fiji.

=== Dance ===
Futuna is quite well known in Vanuatu for its strong custom dance practices and creative Christian worship dance groups. It is common in Futuna to participate in dance groups to perform in any occasion whether it be weddings, religious events or commemorate national holidays.

Some of these custom dance practices have become commercialized to become a means of income for some Futunese communities, with the rise of cultural groups such as Ekasup Cultural Group and Pepeio Cultural Group, performing to tourism and hospitality events.

These groups often perform custom ceremonies and performances in traditional costumes to educate tour groups about Futunese cultural food, stories, songs and other ways of living.

== Notable people ==
- Edward Nipake Natapei

== See also ==
- Polynesian outliers
