= HMS Havannah =

Only one ship of the Royal Navy has borne the name HMS Havannah, after the Cuban city of Havana. However, an unregistered gunboat at Gibraltar also bore the name:

- HMS Havannah (1811) was a 36-gun fifth-rate Apollo-class frigate launched in 1811. She was cut down to a 24-gun sixth rate in 1845, converted to a training ship in 1860, and sold for breaking in 1905.
- Havannah was a gunboat based, and probably locally acquired, at Gibraltar during the Napoleonic Wars. On 25 October 1805 a convoy was transiting the Straits of Gibraltar. Rear-Admiral Purvis sent out all the ships and gunboats available to escort the convoy, Havannah among them. Havannah, under the command of Lieutenant Foote from HMS Queen, sailed to a vessel of the convoy that the Spaniards had captured and that was under tow by her captor. Unfortunately, it turned out the captor was much better armed than Havannah and Foote was forced to surrender after having lost most of his crew to casualties. In all, Havannah had five men killed, two drowned, and 11 wounded, Foote among them.
