= Saratamata =

- Town
- Location in Vanuatu
- Coordinates: 15°17′15″S 167°59′25″E
- Country: Vanuatu
- Province: Penama Province
- Island: Ambae Island
- Elevation: 150 m (490 ft)
- Time zone: UTC+11 (VUT)

Saratamata is the capital of Penama Province of the island country of Vanuatu. It is situated on the eastern shore of Ambae Island and is the largest settlement in that island.

== Economy and infrastructure ==
There are a couple of retail shops, a restaurant, a guest house and a local market selling locally farmed goods. Saratamata is served by a small airfield located in the nearby settlement of Longana with regular domestic flights to Port Vila and Luganville operated by Air Vanuatu.
