= Dillon's Bay Airport =

Airport in Dillon's Bay, Vanuatu

- IATA: DLY; ICAO: NVVD

Summary
- Airport type: Public
- Serves: Erromango, Taféa, Vanuatu
- Location: Dillon's Bay
- Elevation AMSL: 538 ft / 164 m
- Coordinates: 18°46′10″S 169°00′05″E

Map
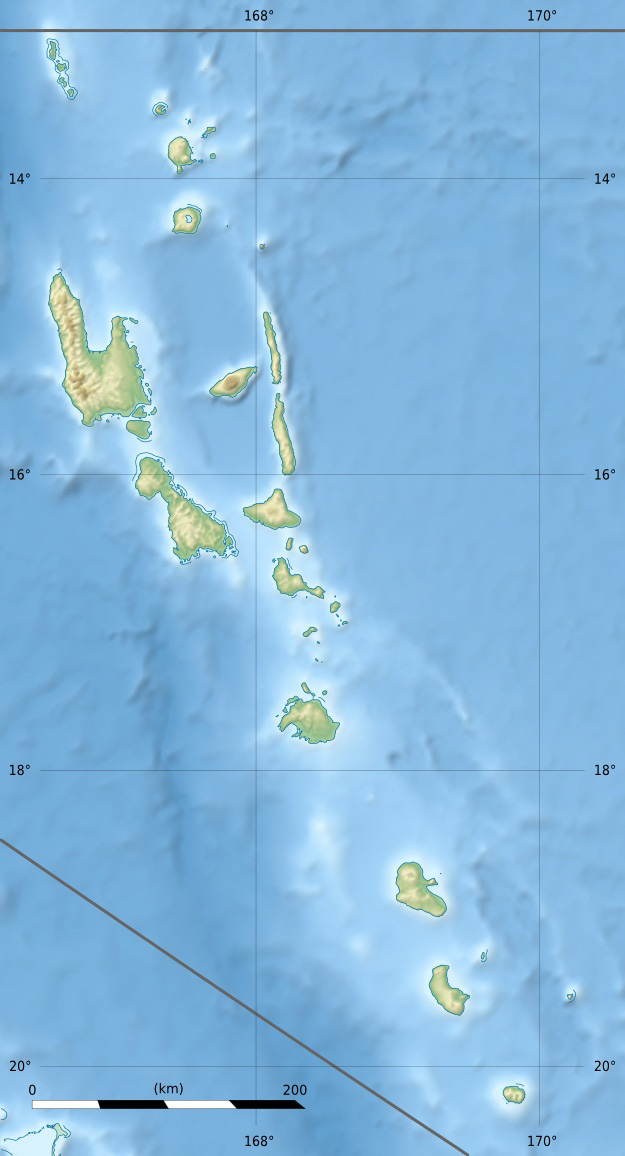
- Location of airport in Vanuatu

Runways
Direction	Length		Surface
Direction	m	ft	Surface
	660	2,165

Dillon's Bay Airport (IATA: DLY, ICAO: NVVD) is an airfield near Dillon's Bay on the island of Erromango, in the Taféa province in Vanuatu.

It is one of two airfields in the island, the other being Ipota Airport in the east.

== Facilities ==
The airport resides at an elevation of 538 feet (164 m) above mean sea level. It has one runway which is 660 metres (2,165 ft) in length.
