= Mount Yasur =

Stratovolcano on Tanna Island, Vanuatu

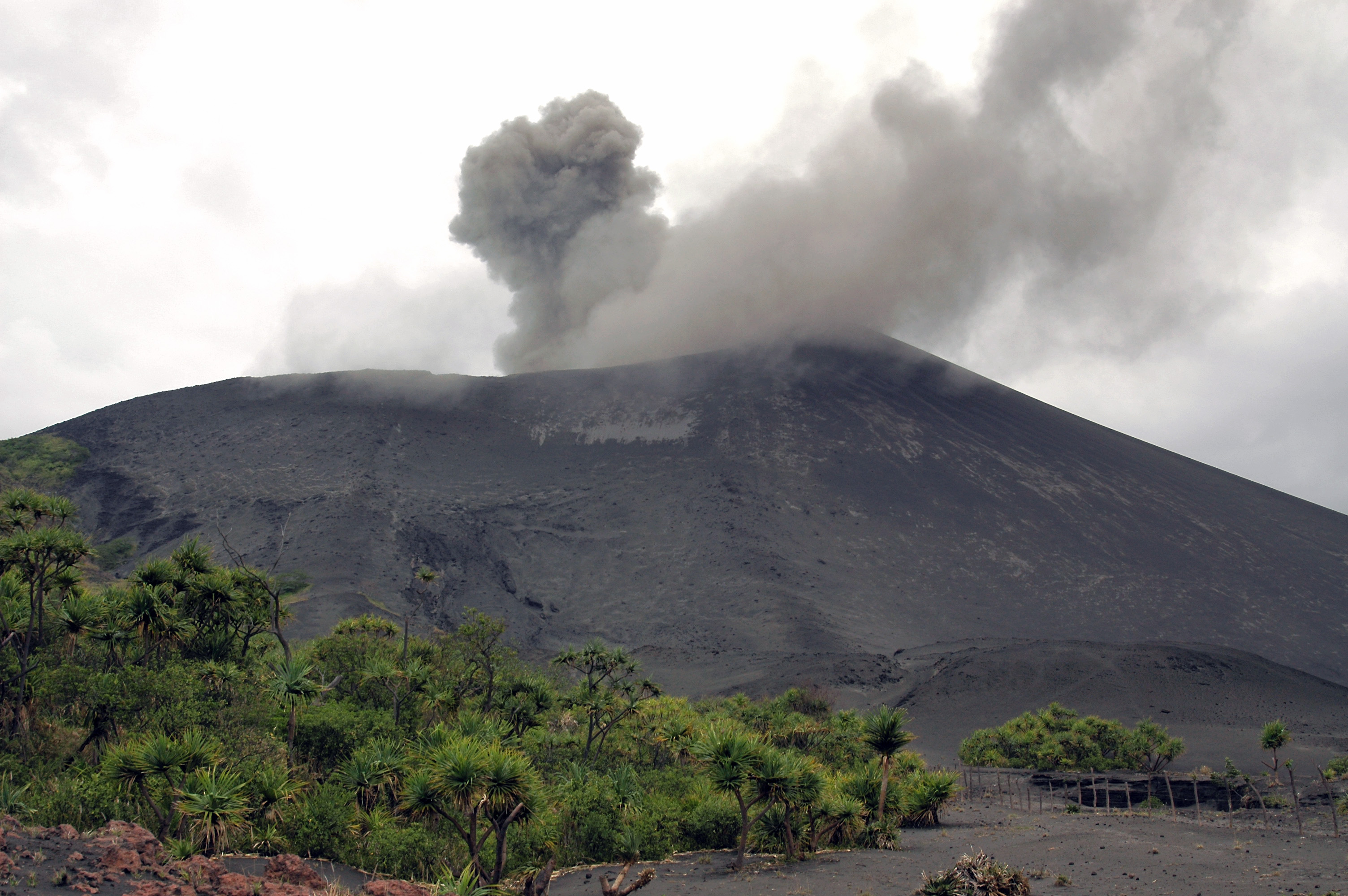
- Mount Yasur

Highest point
- Elevation: 361 m (1,184 ft)
- Coordinates: 19°31′42″S 169°26′54″E

Geography
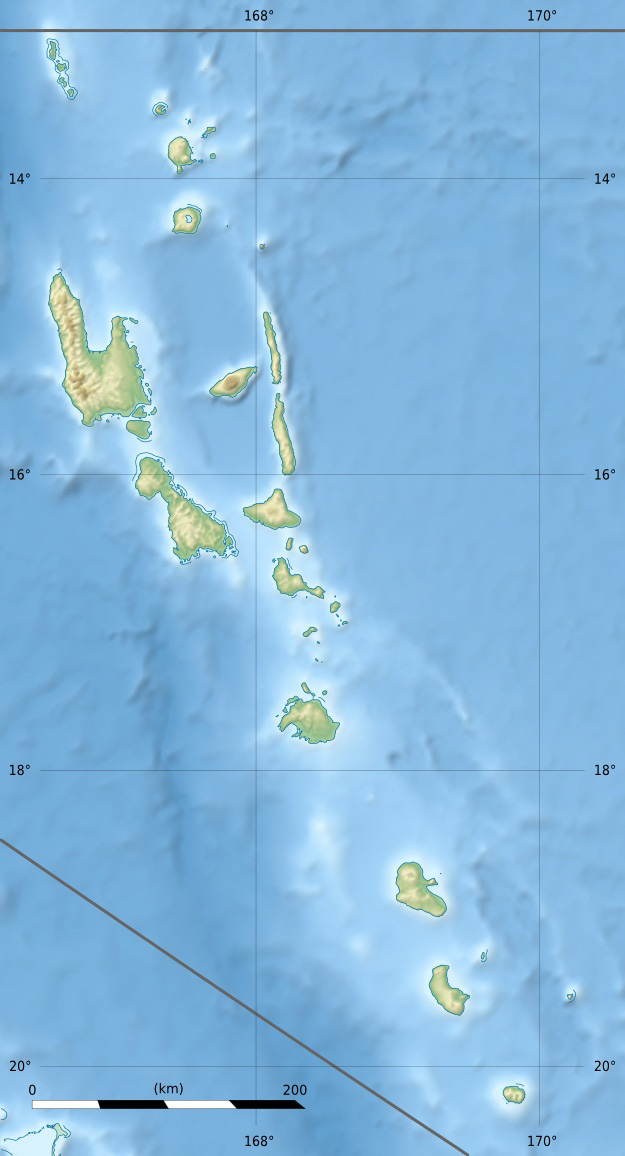
- Location within Vanuatu
- Location: Tanna, Vanuatu

Geology
- Formed by: Volcanism along the Vanuatu subduction zone
- Mountain type: Stratovolcano
- Last eruption: 1774 (possibly earlier) to 2026 (ongoing)

Mount Yasur is an active volcano on Tanna Island, Vanuatu, 361 m (1,184 ft) high above sea level, on the coast near Sulphur Bay, northeast of the taller Mount Tukosmera, which was active in the Pleistocene. It has a largely unvegetated pyroclastic cone with a nearly circular summit crater 400 m in diameter.

It is a stratovolcano, caused by the eastward-moving Indo-Australian Plate being subducted under the westward-moving Pacific Plate. It has been erupting nearly continuously for several hundred years, although it can usually be approached safely. Its eruptions, which often occur several times an hour, are classified as Strombolian or Vulcanian. A large lava plain creeps across the valley at the base.

The glow of the volcano was apparently what attracted Captain James Cook on the first European journey to the island in 1774. Today, the mountain is a sacred area for the John Frum cargo cult. Members of the cult revere John Frum, a deified messenger who foretold the bringing of wealth to the island by American forces, and believe he resides in Mount Yasur with his countrymen. The village of Sulphur Bay, the center of the movement, claims the volcano as part of their territory.

== Name ==
The name of this volcano comes from the Kwamera term iasur meaning "volcano".

== IUGS geological heritage site ==
In respect of its 800-year-long eruption, and being called the lighthouse of the Pacific, the International Union of Geological Sciences (IUGS) included the Yasur–Yenkahe volcanic complex in its assemblage of 100 geological heritage sites around the world in a listing published in October 2022. The organisation defines an IUGS Geological Heritage Site as "a key place with geological elements and/or processes of international scientific relevance, used as a reference, and/or with a substantial contribution to the development of geological sciences through history."

== Public hazards ==
Eruptions on Mount Yasur

Mount Yasur is an easily accessible active volcano, and is a major Vanuatu tourist attraction. The Vanuatu Government monitors the level of volcanic activity in the interests of the public, both tourists and locals alike. This monitoring is carried out by the Vanuatu Geo-Hazards Observatory.

The importance of the volcano to Tanna's tourism industry has resulted in the local government creating levels to alert people. These levels range from 0–5 and notes that An eruption may occur at any level

Volcanic alert levels
Level	Description / status
0	Normal / quiet
1	Signs of volcanic unrest
2	Major unrest
3	Minor eruption
4	Moderate eruption
5	Very large eruption
Tanna / Vanuatu government.
