= Avire, Vanuatu =

Coordinates: 14°12′S 167°34′E

Avire is a city in Vanuatu. It gave its name to the Martian crater Aviré.
