= Longana Airport =

Airport in Vanuatu

- IATA: LOD; ICAO: NVSG

Summary
- Airport type: Public
- Serves: Longana, Aoba Island, Vanuatu
- Elevation AMSL: 167 ft (51 m)
- Coordinates: 15°18′24″S 167°58′02″E

Map
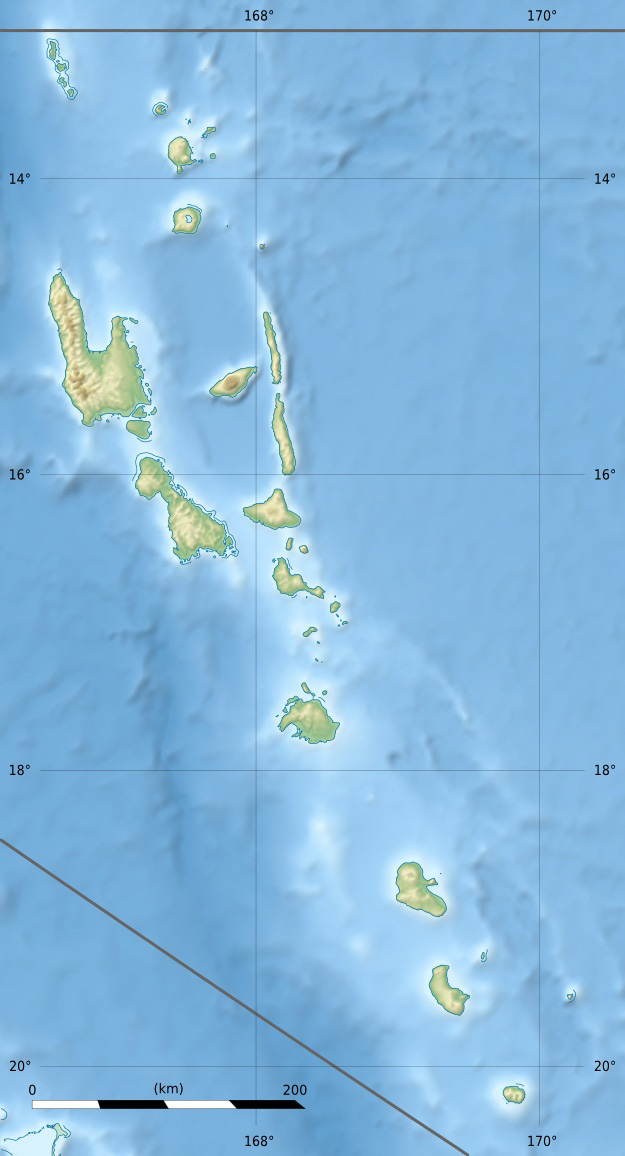
- Location of airport in Vanuatu

Runways
Direction	Length		Surface
Direction	m	ft	Surface
	710	2,297

Longana Airport is an airport in Longana, Vanuatu (IATA: LOD, ICAO: NVSG).

== Airlines and destinations ==
Air Vanuatu connects Longana Airport to Santo International Airport (Luganville) and Port Vila International Airport.
