= Aneityum =

Island in Vanuatu

Anejom̃ (Aneityum)
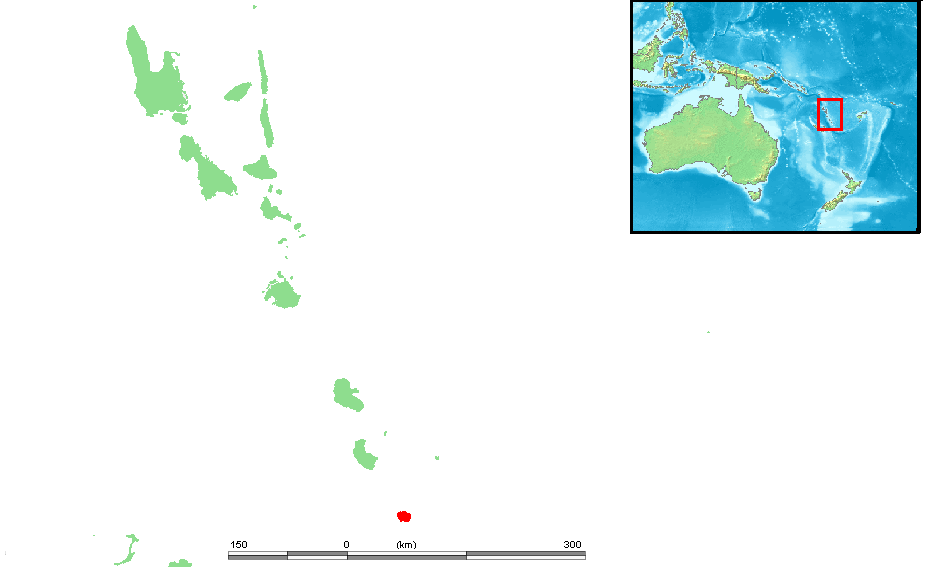
- Location
- Interactive map of Aneityum

Geography
- Coordinates: 20°12′S 169°49′E
- Area: 159.2 km^{2} (61.5 sq mi)
- Highest elevation: 852 m (2795 ft)
- Highest point: Mount Inrerow Atamein

Administration
- Vanuatu

Demographics
- Population: 915 (2009)
- Languages: Aneityum, Bislama, English, French

Aneityum, also known as Anatom or Keamu, and also spelt Aneitum is the southernmost island of Vanuatu, in the province of Tafea.

== History ==
=== Indigenous population ===
The population of the island is believed to have been between 9,000 and 20,000 prior to the arrival of the Europeans in 1793. However, introduced diseases and blackbirding played a major role in Aneityum's massive depopulation, which left the island with fewer than 200 inhabitants in 1930.

=== Traditional chiefdoms ===
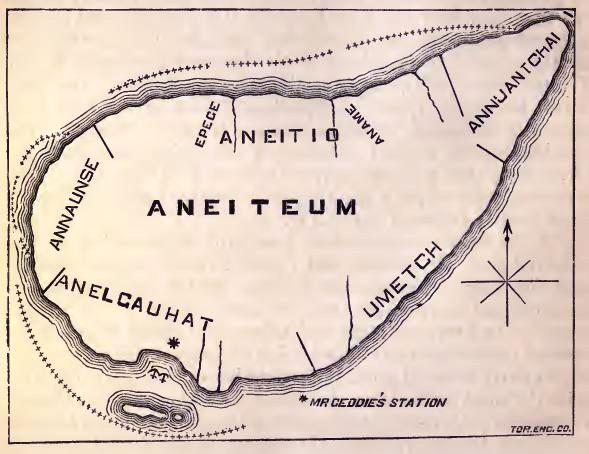
Map of 1882

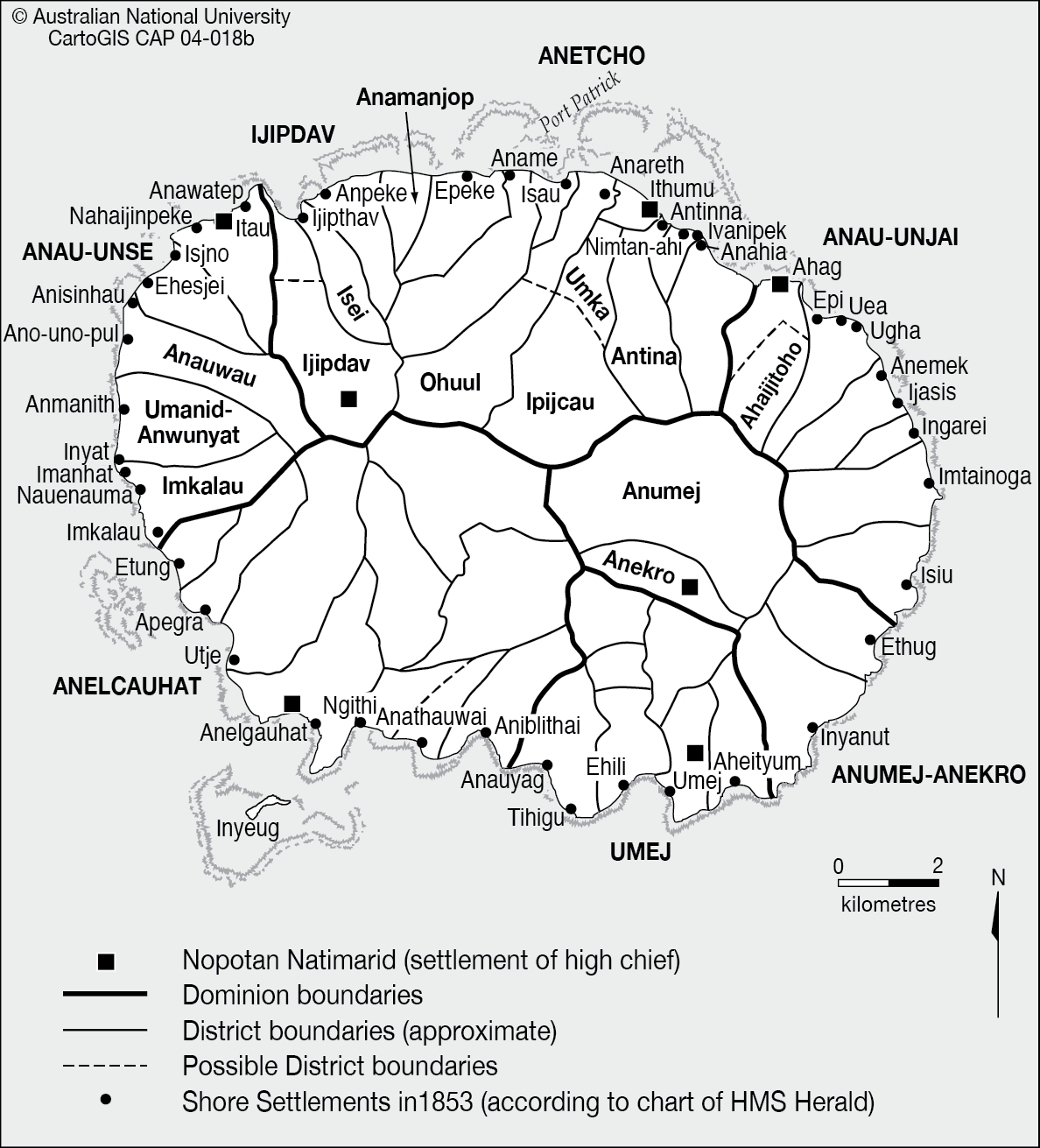
Map of the traditional chiefdoms and districts

At the time of first contact with Europeans (around 1830) the island was subdivided into seven chiefdoms (nelcau) that each were presided by a natimarid (high chief) (clockwise, starting in Northwest:):

- Anau-Unse (Annaunse)
- Ijipdav (Epege)
- Anetcho (Aneitio)
- Anau-Unjai (Aname)
- Anumej-Anekro (Annuantchai)
- Umej (Umetch)
- Anelcauhat

The chiefdoms were further subdivided into more than 50 districts that were presided by minor chiefs (natimi alupas). The power of the chiefs was mainly of ritual nature.

=== European contact ===
The Royal Navy vessel HMS Havannah visited the New Hebrides (now Vanuatu) in late 1850, stopping at "Aneitum", along with the islands of Tanna, Erromango, Efate, Malakula (also with variant spellings) and other islands in the South Pacific Ocean. A second visit was made by the same ship, for the purpose of transporting missionaries to the islands, in May 1851.

== Geography ==
Aneityum is the southernmost island of Vanuatu, in the province of Tafea. The Matthew and Hunter Islands, to the south, are disputed with New Caledonia, but considered by the people of Aneityum Island part of their customary ownership.

Its southeastern cape, Nétchan Néganneaing, is the southernmost point of land in Vanuatu, more southerly than the southern satellite islet Inyeug. The latter, however, is surrounded by Intao Reef, that extends even further south, albeit submerged, thus being the southernmost feature of Vanuatu.

The island is 159.2 km^{2} (61.5 sq mi) in size. It rises to an elevation of 852 m (2,795 feet) in Mount Inrerow Atamein.

The larger of its two villages is Anelcauhat (a.k.a. Anelghowhat), on the south side.

== Population ==
Aneityum had a population of 915 in 2009.

The main language of Aneityum island is also called Aneityum, or Anejom̃ in the local orthography.

== Transport ==
The island is served by Anatom Airport, not on the main island itself, but on the tiny island to its south, Iñec (or Inyeug, also known as "Mystery Island"), across the main village, which has three weekly flights from Port Vila via Tanna.
