= Ambae =

Island in the South Pacific island nation of Vanuatu

Aoba
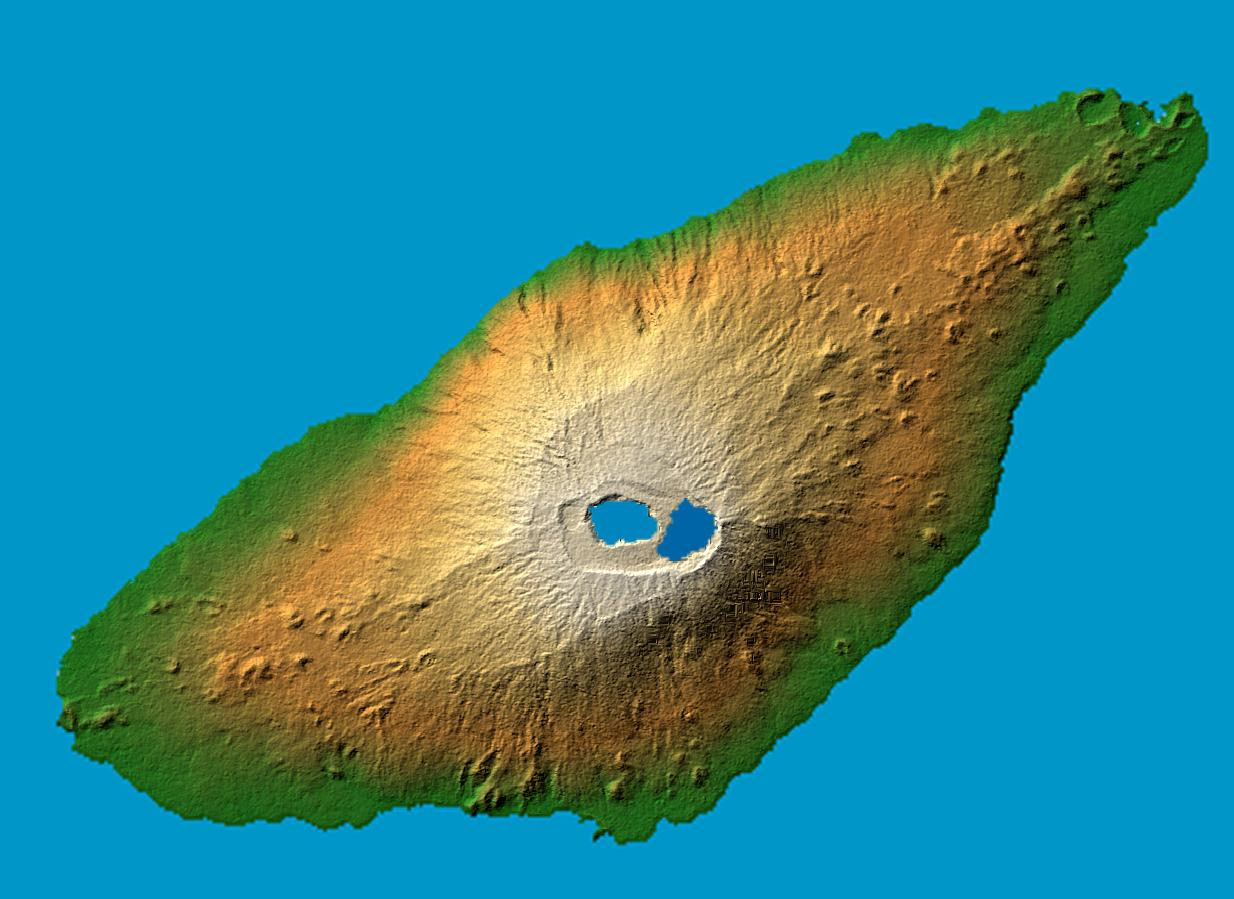
- False color (elevation) and computed shadow map of Ambae Location within Vanuatu

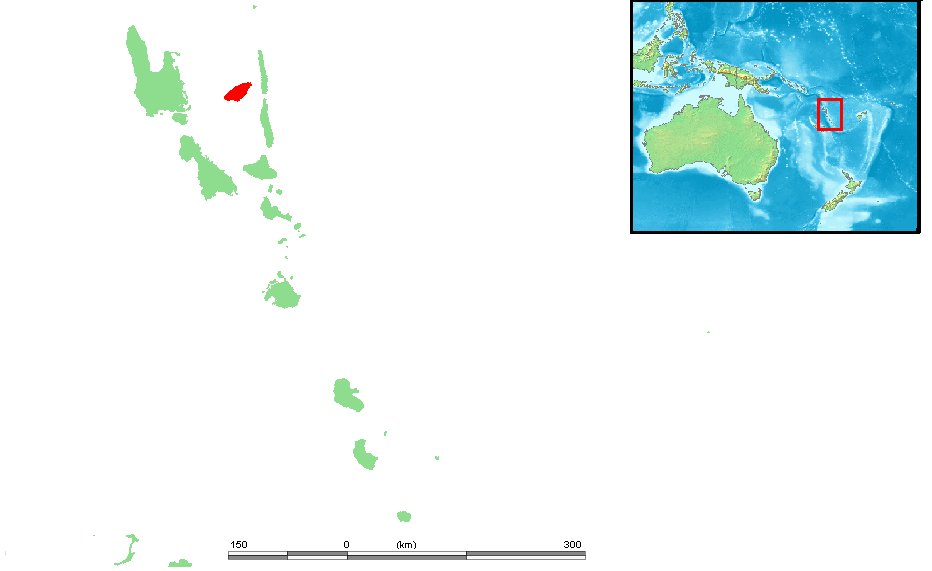
- Map of Ambae

Geography
- Location: Pacific Ocean
- Coordinates: 15°24′0″S 167°50′0″E
- Archipelago: New Hebrides
- Area: 398 km^{2} (154 sq mi)
- Highest elevation: 1,496 m (4908 ft)
- Highest point: Aobahi

Administration
- Vanuatu
- Province: Penama

Demographics
- Population: 9,856 (2020)
- Ethnic groups: Ni-Vanuatu

Geography
- Location: Vanuatu
- Topo map: 400 km^{2} (154 sq mi)

Geology
- Mountain type: Shield volcano
- Last eruption: June to July 2011

Ambae, also known as Aoba, Omba, Oba, or Opa and formerly Lepers’ Island, is an island in the South Pacific island nation of Vanuatu, approximately 310 kilometres (165 nautical miles) north-northwest of Vanuatu's capital city, Port Vila. It is also Vanuatu's largest active volcano.

== Name ==
The various names of Ambae come from the indigenous Oceanic languages spoken within Vanuatu. The forms with a- reflect a locative marker added to the proper name of the island, spelled Oba or Omba, both reflecting a pronunciation of [oᵐba] in the local dialects spoken there. In Mota, once the lingua franca of the Melanesian Mission, it is called Opa [opa]. All of these terms come from a Proto-North-Central Vanuatu form *oᵐba.

== History ==
The first recorded sighting by Europeans was by the Spanish expedition of Pedro Fernández de Quirós in the spring of 1606.

The misty sight of Ambae from neighboring Espiritu Santo, which served as a major World War II airbase, inspired the mythical Bali Ha'i in James Michener's Tales of the South Pacific.

== Geography ==
Rough, black basalt stones compose its shoreline and surface in many places, though the soils (where present) are rich. The island appears to be covered in nearly unbroken vegetation; inhabited areas feature large gardens and managed forests above, with coconut and cacao plantations usually closer to shore. There are no reliable sources of surface water (rivers, streams, or lakes), save the crater lakes which are inaccessible. Water for all human uses comes from cement-lined wells or water tanks filled with rainwater.

There are no permanent rivers on the island, but the population rarely suffers from water shortages.

The climate is both humid tropical with slight seasonal variations. The average annual temperature on the coast is 30 °C, on the caldera - 23 °C. The average annual rainfall varies from 2500 to 3500 mm of rain. The rainy season lasts from November to April.

=== Important Bird Area ===
The upper slopes of the island have been recognised as an Important Bird Area (IBA) by BirdLife International because they support populations of Tanna fruit doves, red-bellied fruit doves, palm lorikeets, cardinal myzomelas, Vanuatu honeyeaters, fan-tailed gerygones, Polynesian trillers, long-tailed trillers, streaked fantails, Melanesian flycatchers, buff-bellied monarchs, southern shrikebills, Vanuatu white-eyes and rusty-winged starlings.

=== Volcano ===
Ambae is the emergent portion of Vanuatu's most voluminous volcano, Manaro Voui, which rises 1,496 meters above sea level, or about 3,900 meters above the sea floor. A steam and ash eruption began on November 27, 2005, leading to a Level 2 volcano alert and preparations for evacuations. On December 8, 2005, the eruption became stronger, displacing more than 3,000 of Ambae Island's inhabitants to elsewhere on the island and requiring the evacuation of two hospitals.

On September 28, 2017, after a week of increasing volcanic activity to Level 4 (Level 5 being a major eruption), the government of Vanuatu ordered a complete evacuation of the island, home to about 11,000 residents. Ash from the eruption has covered the island, killing crops and polluting the air and water. In April 2018 the remaining approximately 10,000 residents were ordered to evacuate permanently.

== Demographics ==
The population is Melanesian, though (anecdotally) ancient Polynesian admixtures have given Man-Ambae lighter complexions and Polynesian languages. Religiously Ambae is exclusively Christian, split into many denominations. These can be characterized in three stages: the original colonial-missionary churches (Anglican, Catholic), the second-stage, often American-origin evangelical denominations (Apostolic, Church of Christ, Assemblies of God), and the newer, less orthodox, fusion/'unity' sects. This last category includes many grass-roots groups originating within Vanuatu. Missionary activity from outside the country continues, especially from Mormons, who have a growing following on west and north Ambae.

== Population ==
Ambae has a population of less than 11,000, divided into 3–4 discernible language groups (North/East Ambae language centered on the Lombaha area, West Ambae language centered on Nduindui, and South Ambae language centered on Redcliffe). The island has no considerable towns, though the Penama provincial center is located at Saratamata on East Ambae.

== Economy and agriculture ==
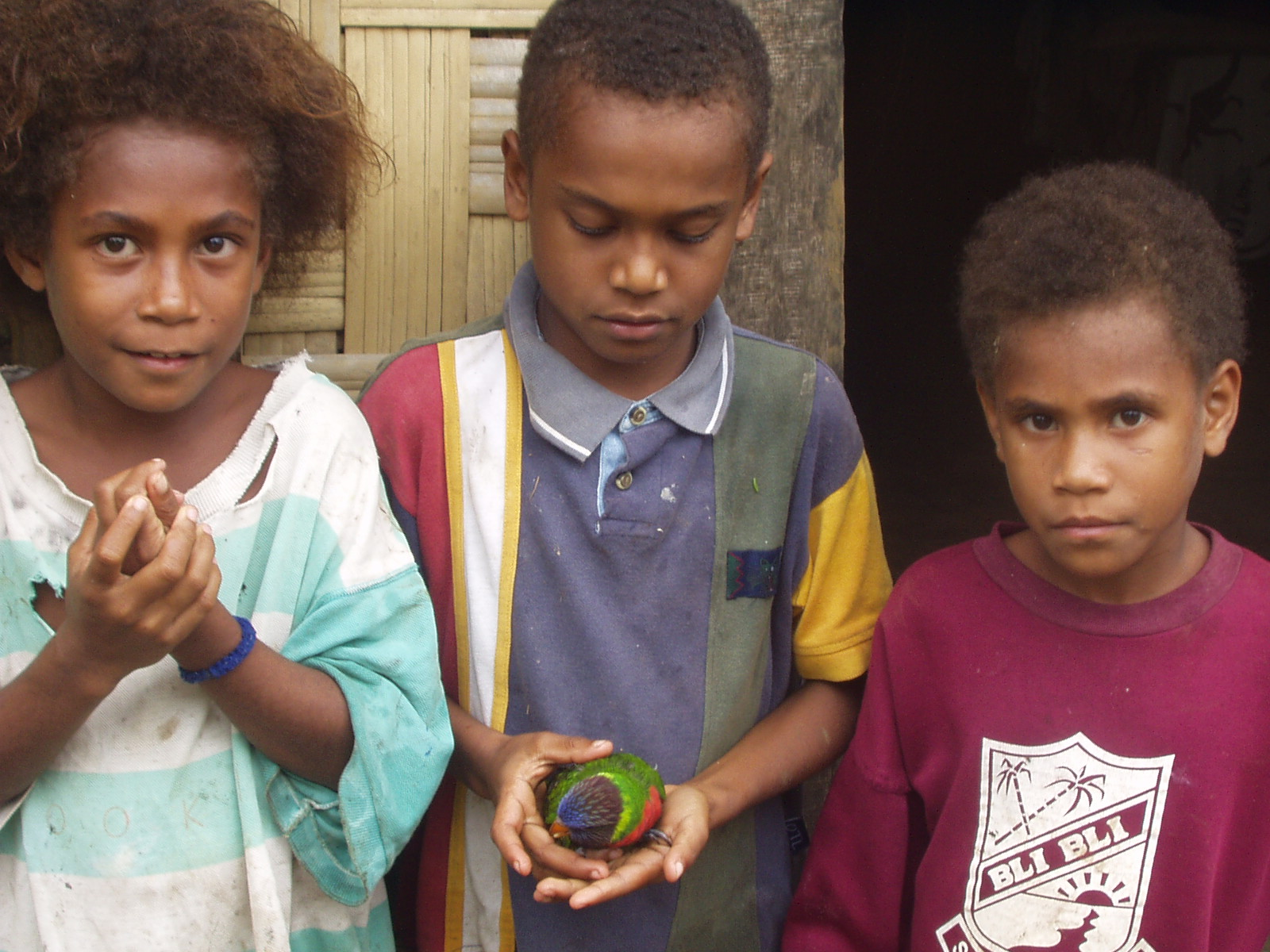
Ambae children with pet lorikeet

The local economy is largely non-monetary, with cash crop income (from copra, cacao, and dried kava) being used primarily for school fees and sundry items like soap, salt, kerosene, etc. Most regular employment is in the public sector, as teachers. Remittances from employed relatives in the towns of Santo or Vila also contribute cash to the local economy.

Ambae is serviced by fewer than 100 telephone lines, mostly on the east side. It has two post offices and National Bank of Vanuatu branches, at Saratamata and Nduindui, regular interisland ship traffic, and several Vanair flights a week. Of the small-to-medium outer islands of Vanuatu (i.e., not Efate, Santo, Tanna or Malekula), Ambae must be considered one of the more "developed."

Traditional subsistence agriculture satisfies food needs, while most villagers engage in small-scale cash crop production as well. Often grown in large upland gardens (with good rainfall and safe from roving pigs), the primary crops are taro, banana, yam, and manioc. Sweet potatoes, vegetables, fruits and nuts are staples of the local diet, though protein is occasionally lacking. Without substantial reefs, seafood is less significant a protein source compared with other islands of Vanuatu and in any case is inaccessible to the large populations living at high inland elevations.

== Transportation ==
The island is served by three airstrips with services by Air Vanuatu: Walaha Airport in the southwest, Redcliffe Airport in the south and Longana Airport in the northeast.

== Notable people ==
- Nadia Kanegai - social entrepreneur and politician.
- Merilyn Tahi - women's rights activist and co-founder of Vanuatu Women's Centre.
