= Mystery Island (Vanuatu) =

Island in Vanuatu

Inyeug
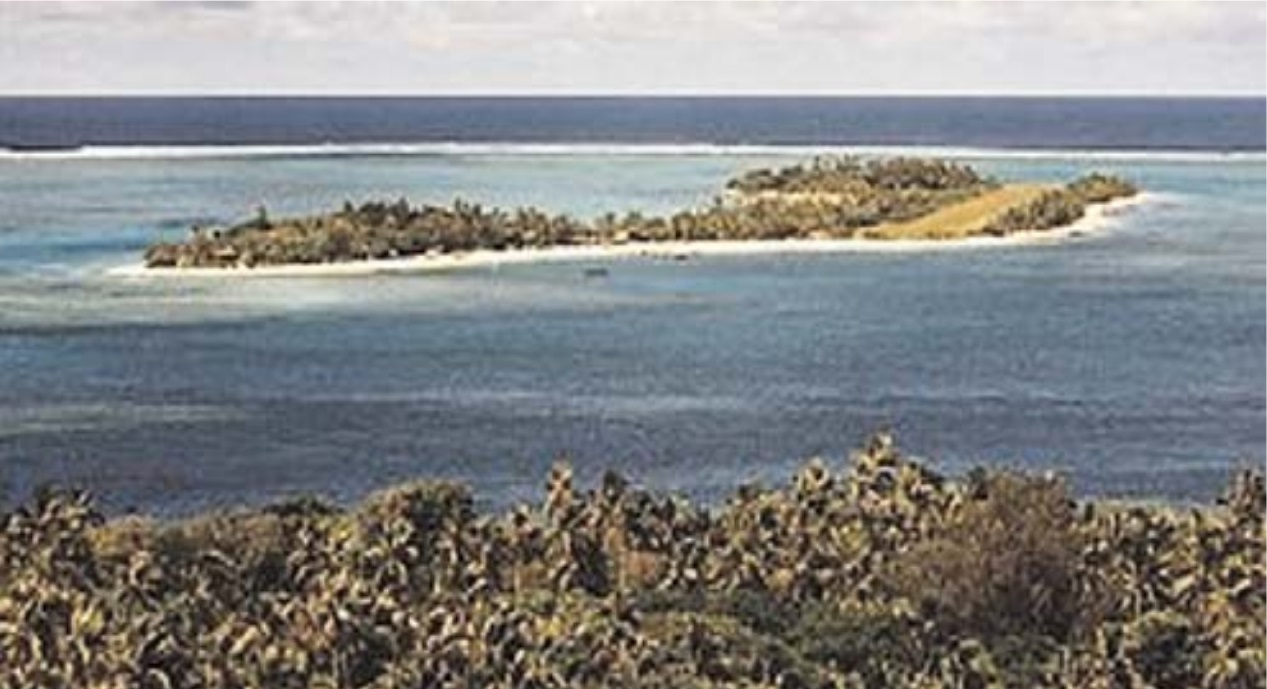
- Inyeug in 2017.
- Interactive map of Inyeug

Geography
- Location: Pacific Ocean
- Coordinates: 20°14′57.08″S 169°46′16.22″E
- Archipelago: Vanuatu

Administration
- Vanuatu
- Province: Tafea Province

Demographics
- Population: 0 (2015)

Inyeug Island, also known as Mystery Island, is a small uninhabited island in Tafea Province of Vanuatu in the Pacific Ocean. "Inyeug" means "Small Island" in a local language.

Inyueg is also called Mystery Island by the cruise ships that regularly visit the island.

The island was visited by Queen Elizabeth II and Prince Philip in 1974, with the name "Mystery Island" coined to generate a more interesting headline of the report of the visit.

== Geography ==
The island has an area of about 15.9 hectares and is located only 1 km south of the island of Aneityum. Inyeug is flanked to the west and south by the coral Intao Reef, that extends further south, and, albeit submerged, is the southernmost point of Vanuatu.

The island has the airport for the neighboring inhabited Aneityum Island. The airport is basically a grass airstrip, which gets small plane flights twice weekly from Port Vila via Tanna Island.
