= Ipota =

- Village
- Location within Bosnia and Herzegovina
- Coordinates: 44°15′N 17°17′E
- Country: Bosnia and Herzegovina
- Entity: Federation of Bosnia and Herzegovina
- Canton: Central Bosnia
- Municipality: Jajce

Area
  - Total: 3.19 sq mi (8.25 km^{2})

Population (2013)
  - Total: 310
  - Density: 97/sq mi (38/km^{2})
- Time zone: UTC+1 (CET)
  - Summer (DST): UTC+2 (CEST)

Ipota is a village in the municipality of Jajce, Bosnia and Herzegovina.

== Demographics ==
According to the 2013 census, its population was 310.

Ethnicity in 2013
Ethnicity	Number	Percentage
Bosniaks	278	89.7%
Serbs	1	0.3%
other/undeclared	31	10.0%
Total	310	100%
