= Sulphur Bay =

Bay on the eastern side of Tanna Island in Vanuatu

Coordinates: 19°30′39.6″S 169°27′54″E

Sulphur Bay is a bay on the eastern side of Tanna island in Vanuatu. Nearby is Mount Yasur, called the world's most accessible volcano.

== History ==
Sulphur Bay was the first part of the island visited by Westerners, when the glow of Mount Yasur attracted James Cook in 1774.

The area is the center of the John Frum cargo cult, a movement that believes their savior, an American World War II GI, resides within Yasur with his men.
