= Provinces of Vanuatu =

Vanuatu has been divided into six provinces since 1994. The names in English of all provinces are derived from the initial letters of their constituent islands:

#	Province	Capital	Main islands	Land Area (km^{2})	Population Census 2020
1	Malampa	Lakatoro	Ambrym, Malakula, Paama	2,779	42,499
2	Penama	Saratamata	Pentecost Island, Ambae, Maéwo	1,198	35,607
3	Sanma	Luganville	Santo, Malo	4,248	60,884
4	Shefa	Port Vila	Efate, Shepherd Islands, Epi	1,455	103,987
5	Tafea	Isangel	Tanna, Aniwa, Futuna, Erromango, Anatom	1,628	45,714
6	Torba	Sola	Banks and Torres Islands	882	11,330
	Vanuatu	Port Vila		12,190	300,019

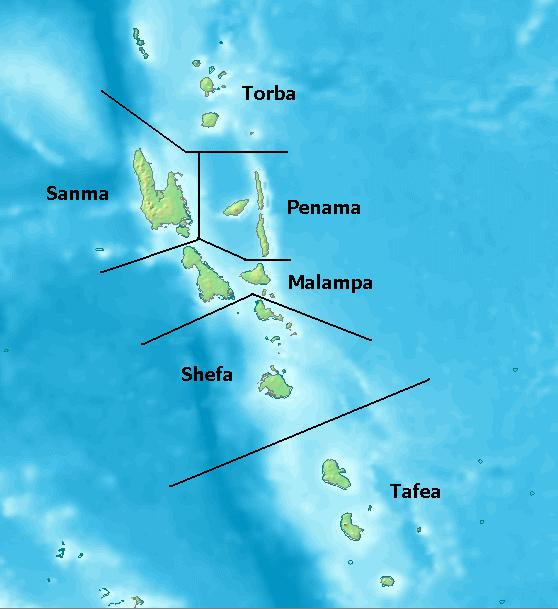
Provinces of Vanuatu

== Municipalities ==
The provinces are in turn divided into municipalities headed by a council and a mayor elected from among the members of the council.

In Tafea Province, for example, are the following municipalities (council areas):

- North Erromango
- South Erromango
- North Tanna
- West Tanna
- Middle Bush Tanna
- Whitesands
- South West Tanna
- South Tanna

The islands of Aniwa, Futuna and Aneityum appear to consist of one municipality each.

== Island regions (historical) ==
From 1985 to 1994 it was divided into eleven island regions:

Island Region	Capital	part of current Province	Land Area (km^{2})	Population Census 1999 or estimate
Ambae & Maéwo	Longana	Penama	708	14,646
Ambrym	Eas	Malampa	678	7,787
Banks &Torres	Sola	Torba	882	7,757
Éfaté	Port Vila	Shefa	915	50,000
Epi	Ringdove	Shefa	451	3,000
Malakula	Lakatoro	Malampa	2,043	23,361
Paama	Liro	Malampa	58	1,557
Pentecost	Loltong	Penama	490	12,000
Santo &Malo	Luganville	Sanma	4,248	36,084
Shepherd Islands	Morua	Shefa	89	1,439
Taféa	Isangel	Tafea	1,628	29,047
New Hebrides	Port Vila		12,189	186,678

== Districts (historical) ==
During the Condominium era, specifically from 1968 to 1984 the group was divided into four administrative districts:

District	Capital	Main Islands	Current Provinces	Land Area (km^{2})	Population Census 1999
Southern District (Tanna)	Lénakel	Tanna, Aniwa, Futuna, Erromango, Anatom	Tafea	1,628	29,047
Central District 1 (Efaté)	Port Vila	Efate, Epi, Shepherd Islands	Shefa	1,455	54,439
Central District 2 (Malékoula)	Lamap	Ambrym, Malakula, Paama, Pentecôte	Malampa, Penama (part)	3,269	44,705
Northern District (Santo)	Luganville	Santo, Malo, Banks and Torres Islands, Aoba, Maewo	Sanma, Torba, Penama (part)	5,838	58,487
Vanuatu	Port Vila			12,189	186,678

== Districts (1950) ==
In the 1950s, districts appeared to denote the finest administrative level, finer than the current municipalities or council areas, but above the village level. The island of Tanna was subdivided into 12 such districts, in 1952:

- District Sud (ou de Kwamera)
- District de Green PointDistrict Sud-Ouest
- District de Lenakel
- District Nord-Ouest
- District de Green Hill et de Launalang
- District du Centre Nord
- District du Centre Brousse
- District de Loanvialu
- District de Waesisi
- District de White Sands

== See also ==
- ISO 3166-2:VU
