= Penama Province =

Province of Vanuatu

Coordinates: 15°30′S 168°00′E

Penama
- Province
- Flag

- Penama in Vanuatu
- Country: Vanuatu
- Capital: Saratamata

Area
  - Total: 1,198 km^{2} (463 sq mi)

Population (2016)
  - Total: 32,543
  - Density: 27.16/km^{2} (70.36/sq mi)

Penama is one of the six provinces of Vanuatu, located in the northeast of the country. It consists of three major islands:Ambae (or Aoba), Maewo, and Pentecost. The name Penama is derived from the initial letters of PENtecost, Ambae and MAewo.

== Administrative divisions ==
Penama Province are subdivided into ten area councils, which are further subdivided into populated places (i.e., villages, communities, etc.).

- Central Pentecost I Area Council
- Central Pentecost II Area Council
- East Ambae Area Council
- North Ambae Area Council
- North Maewo Area Council
- North Pentecost Area Council
- South Ambae Area Council
- South Maewo Area Council
- South Pentecost Area Council
- West Ambae Area Council

== Population ==
Penama ha a population of 30,819 as of the 2009 census and an area of 1,198 km^{2}. Its capital is Saratamata on Ambae, but there are plans to move the capital to a different island due to a volcanic eruption.

== Islands ==
Name	Population	Area
Ambae	10,407	398 km^{2} (154 sq mi)
Maewo	3,569	269 km^{2} (104 sq mi)
Pentecost	16,843	490 km^{2} (190 sq mi)
