= Tafea Province =

Province of Vanuatu

Tafea
- Province
- Flag

- Tafea in Vanuatu
- Country: Vanuatu
- Capital: Isangel

Area
  - Total: 1,628 km^{2} (629 sq mi)

Population (2016)
  - Total: 37,050
  - Density: 22.76/km^{2} (58.94/sq mi)

Tafea is the southernmost of the six provinces of Vanuatu. The name is an acronym for the five main islands that make up the province: Tanna, Aneityum, Futuna, Erromango and Aniwa.

== History ==
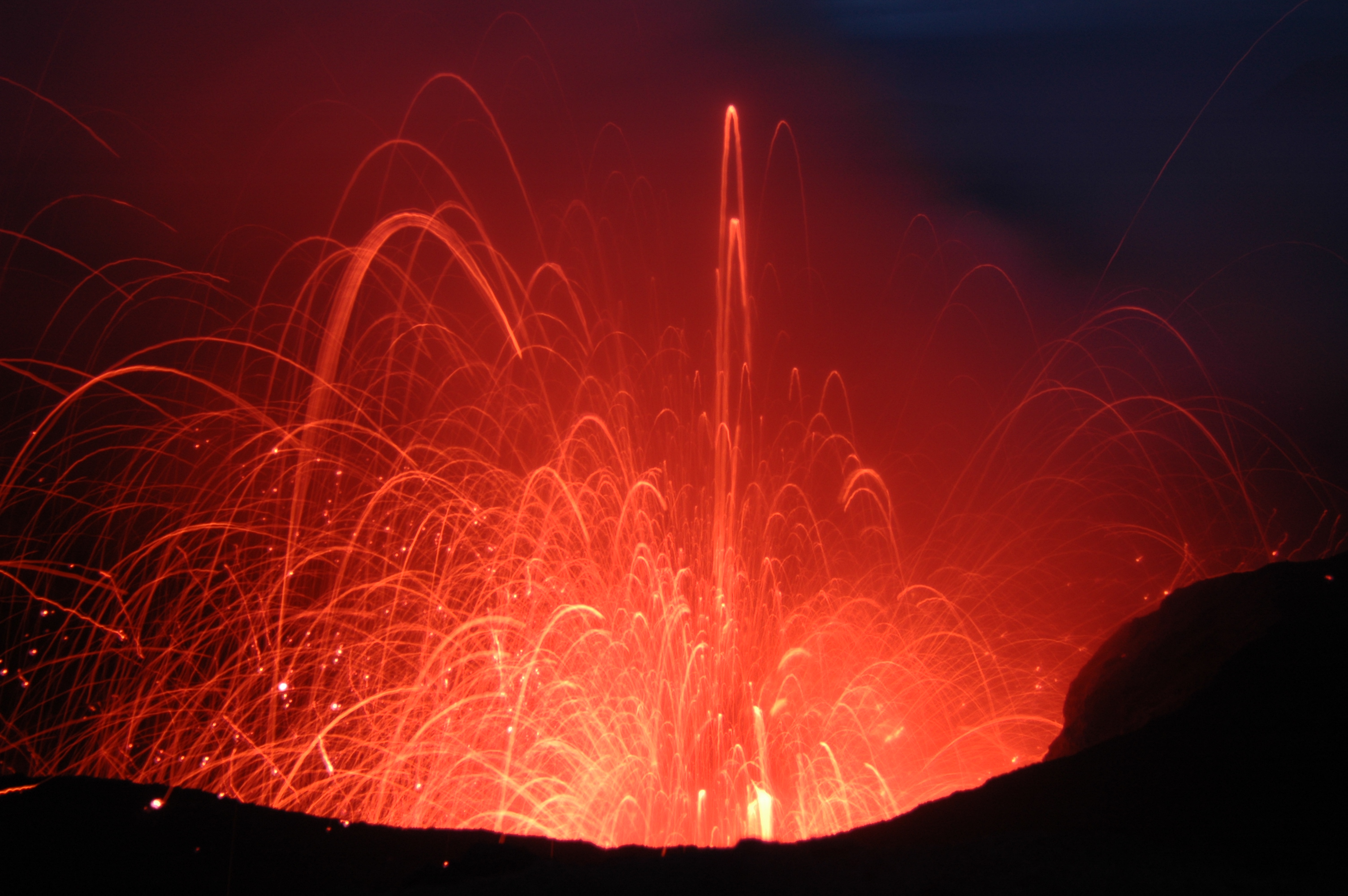
Mt. Yasur on Tanna island

Flag of secessionist Nation of Tanna

Flag of the secessionist Tafea Nation

Unlike the other provinces of Vanuatu, the territorial integrity of this administrative unit has been unchanged since the times of the Condominium, when it was called Southern District, or Tanna after the main island. Only the capital moved from Lenakel to nearby Isangel, less than two kilometers more southeast.

A secessionist movement began in the 1970s, and the Nation of Tanna was proclaimed on 24 March 1974. While the British were more open to allowing its holdings in Vanuatu independence, it was opposed by the French colonists and finally suppressed by the Anglo-French Condominium authorities on 29 June 1974.

In 1980, there was another attempt to secede, declaring the Tafea Nation on 1 January 1980, its name coming from the initials of the five islands that were to be part of the nation (Tanna, Aniwa, Futuna, Erromango and Aneityum). British forces intervened on 26 May 1980, allowing the islands to become part of the newly independent nation of Vanuatu on 30 July 1980.

== Geography ==
The province had a population of 32,540 in 2009 and has an area of 1,628 km^{2}. The main island, though second to Erromango in area, is Tanna, with some 80 percent of the province population, with the provincial capital of Isangel, and the largest village of Lenakel, both close together on the southwest coast.

The three larger islands are Melanesian, but the smaller two, Aniwa and Futuna, also known under the collective term Erronan Islands, are Polynesian outliers. Futuna is sometimes called West Futuna to distinguish it from Futuna Island, Wallis and Futuna.

The island of Tanna has the world's most accessible volcano, Mount Yasur, with 1,084 meters the highest peak of the province. Aniwa Island is the only coral island, the other four are volcanic and reach much higher elevations than Aniwa.

Anatom is the southernmost island of Vanuatu (not counting the remote, tiny and uninhabited Matthew and Hunter Islands, 280 to 335 kilometres (174–208 miles) to the southeast, which are disputed with New Caledonia, but which are considered by the people of Anatom Island part of their custom ownership). Its southeastern cape Nétchan Néganneaing is the southernmost point of land in Vanuatu, more southerly than the southern satellite islet Inyeug. The latter, however, is surrounded Intao Reef, that extends even further south, albeit submerged, thus being the southernmost feature of Vanuatu.

=== Islands ===
Island	main village	Land Area (km^{2})	Population	peak	height (meters)	Coordinates
Tanna	Lenakel	565	28,799	Mount Tukosmera	1,084	19°29′15″S 169°19′50″E
Aniwa	Ikaokao	8	341	–	42	19°15′01″S 169°36′04″E
Futuna	Ihsia	11	513	Tatafou	666	19°31′47″S 170°13′08″E
Erromango (Note: including Vete Manung (Île de la Chèvre, Goat Island) (5.6 km northeast, 0.12 km^{2} area) and Vete Manung Island (15 km northeast))	Potnarvin	975	1,950	Mount Santop	886	18°48′50″S 169°07′22″E
Aneityum (Note: including Inyeug Island (0.6 km southwest, airport of Anatom), but without the remote Matthew and Hunter Islands, which are considered by the people of Anatom Island part of their custom ownership)	Anelgauhat	162	915	Mount Inrerow Atahein	852	20°11′18″S 169°49′34″E
Tafea	Isangel	1,721	32,549	Mount Tukosmera	1,084	19°30′S 169°30′E

== Administrative divisions ==
Tafea Province are subdivided into twelve area councils, which are further subdivided into populated places (i.e.: villages, communities, etc.).

- Aneityum Area Council
- Aniwa Area Council
- Central Tanna Area Council
- East Tanna Area Council
- Futuna Area Council
- North Erromango Area Council
- North Tanna Area Council
- South East Tanna Area Council
- South Erromango Area Council
- South Tanna Area Council
- South West Tanna Area Council
- West Tanna Area Council
