= List of airlines of Vanuatu =

This is a list of airlines currently operating in Vanuatu.

== Active ==
Airline	Image	IATA	ICAO	Callsign	Founded	Notes
Air Vanuatu		NF	AVN	AIR VAN	1981	Flag carrier
Unity Airlines					2005	Charter operator
Vanuatu Helicopters						

== Defunct ==
Airline	Image	IATA	ICAO	Callsign	Founded	Ceased operations	Notes
Air Melanesiæ		HB	MEL		1965	1989	Formed by New Hebrides Airways and Hebridair. Later renamed Vanair
Dovair					1987	1990	
New Hebrides Airways					1963	1965	Merged with Hebridair to form Air Melanesiæ
Hebridair					1964	1965	Merged with New Hebrides Airways to form Air Melanesiæ
Vanair		X4	ZHI		1989	2004	Originally formed as Air Melanesiae. Acquired by Air Vanuatu in 2001 for five months, when the merger was reversed. The airlines remerged in 2004.

== See also ==
- List of defunct airlines of Vanuatu
