= Vanair =

Domestic airline based in Vanuatu

IATA	ICAO	Call sign
X4	ZHI*	-
- Founded: 1965
- Ceased operations: September 2004 (merged to Air Vanuatu)
- Hubs: Bauerfield International Airport
- Fleet size: 4
- Destinations: 29
- Headquarters: Port Vila, Vanuatu

Vanair was a domestic airline based in Vanuatu. The airline flew to 29 destinations on 18 of Vanuatu's 83 islands, and was wholly owned by the Vanuatu government.

== History ==
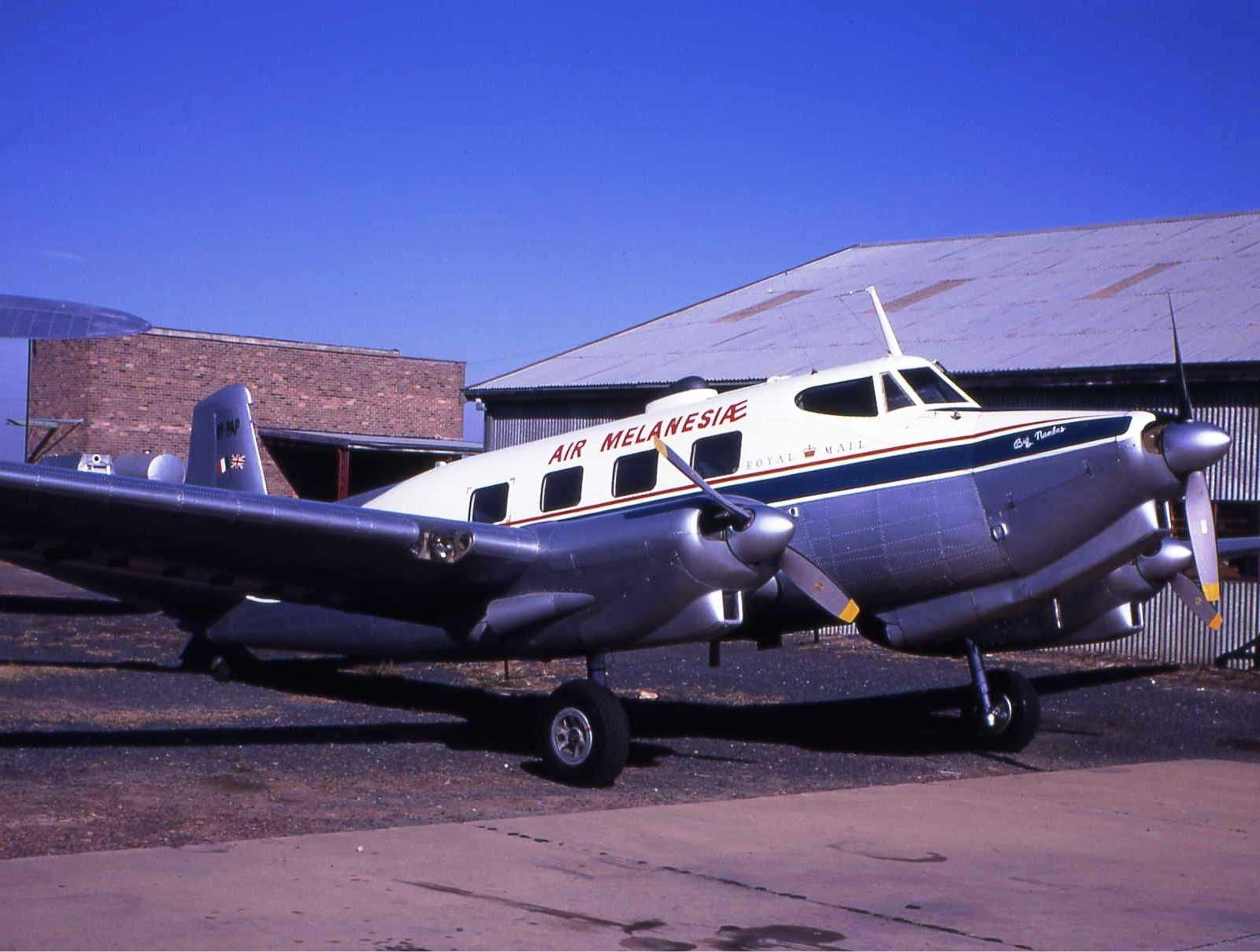
Air Melanesiæ de Havilland Australia DHA-3 Drover at Bankstown Airport (early 1970s).

The airline commenced operations as Air Melanesiæ in 1965 as a joint venture between two existing airlines, the British-owned New Hebrides Airways (founded in 1963) and French-owned Société Néo-Hébridaise de Transports Aériens, known as Hebridair (founded 1964). New Hebrides Airways contributed a de Havilland Australia DHA-3 Drover to the operation, while Hebridair provided a Dornier Do 28, however the Do 28 crashed in 1966. By the beginning of the 1970s the airline was controlled by Qantas and British Overseas Airways Corporation via their shareholdings in New Hebrides Airways, and by Union des Transports Aériens which had taken over Hebridair and renamed it Société Française des Nouvelles-Hébrides. Sir Dennis Buchanan of Talair, Papua New Guinea bought out Qantas BA and UTA in the late 1970s and ran it very successfully with an Islander, a Trislander, several DH6s and an Embraer Bandeirante, until the Government wanted to take over, and denied the renewal of the chief engineers work permit. The Government subsequently set up Vanair as a government-owned company. The Government-owned airline was run successfully under the leadership of Mr Murray Pope but following his departure the airline nearly collapsed with the introduction of an expensive lease on a Dash 8 aircraft. As it was going broke it was merged with the Government's International Airline, Air Vanuatu and de-merged again in 2001/2 only to go bankrupt again, and to be re-merged with Air Vanuatu. In 2004, it merged with Vanuatu's government-owned flag carrier, Air Vanuatu.

== Fleet ==
At the time of the merger with Air Vanuatu the Vanair fleet included:

- 4 de Havilland Canada DHC-6 Twin Otter Series 300

=== 1981 ===
- 4 Britten-Norman Islander
- 1 Britten-Norman Trislander

=== 1971 ===
- 5 Britten-Norman Islander
- 1 de Havilland Australia DHA-3 Drover

== Incidents and accidents ==
- 8 May 1999 - A Vanair de Havilland Canada DHC-6 Twin Otter with twelve people on board crashed into the sea near Port Vila during heavy rain. Seven people were killed.
- 25 July 1991 - A Britten-Norman Islander crashed into a mountain near Olpoi Airport. All nine people on board were killed.
- 30 January 1990 - A Vanair Britten-Norman Trislander crashed. Details unknown.
