= Air Vanuatu Flight 241 =

2018 aviation accident in Vanuatu

Accident
- Date: 28 July 2018
- Summary: Runway excursion during emergency landing due to pilot error and loss of situational awareness.
- Site: Bauerfield International Airport, Port Vila, Vanuatu
- Total fatalities: 0
- Total injuries: 13
- Total survivors: 43

First aircraft
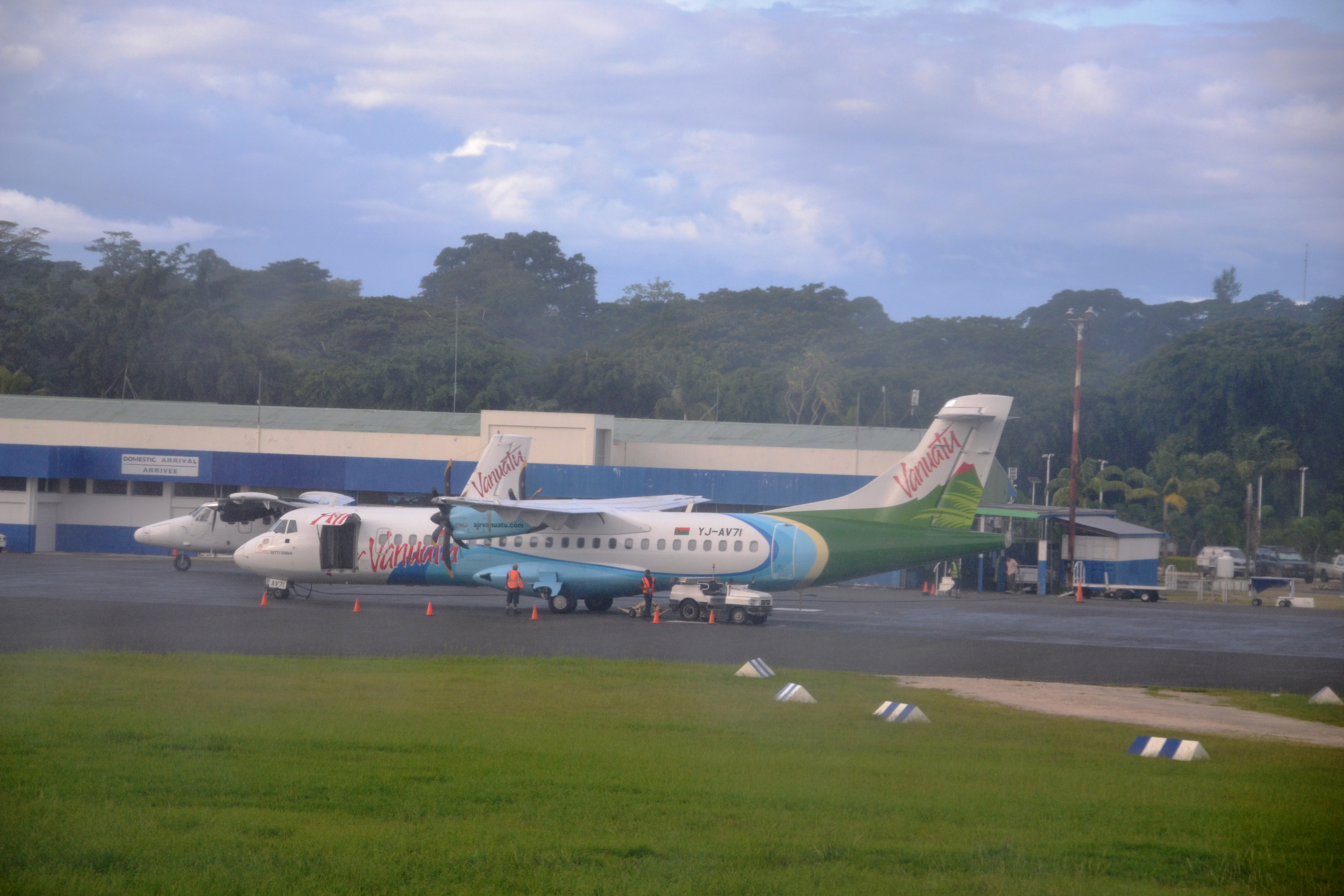
- YJ-AV71, the aircraft involved in the accident
- Type: ATR 72-500
- Operator: Air Vanuatu
- Registration: YJ-AV71
- Flight origin: Whitegrass Airport, Tanna Vanuatu
- Destination: Bauerfield International Airport, Port Vila, Vanuatu
- Occupants: 43
- Passengers: 39
- Crew: 4
- Fatalities: 0
- Injuries: 13
- Survivors: 43 (all)

Second aircraft
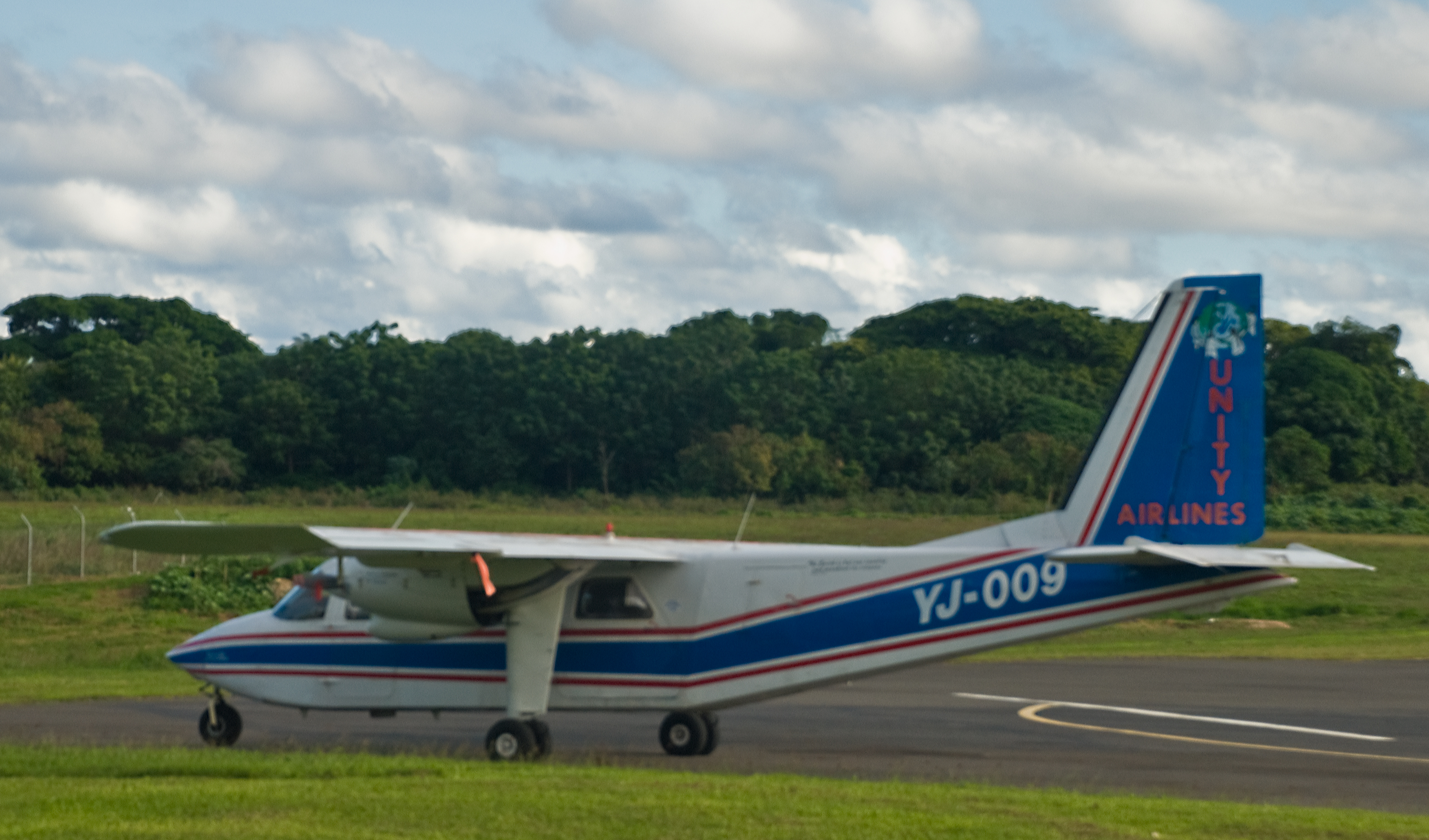
- YJ-OO9, the aircraft involved in the accident
- Type: Britten-Norman Islander
- Operator: Unity Airlines
- Registration: YJ-OO9
- Occupants: 0

Third aircraft
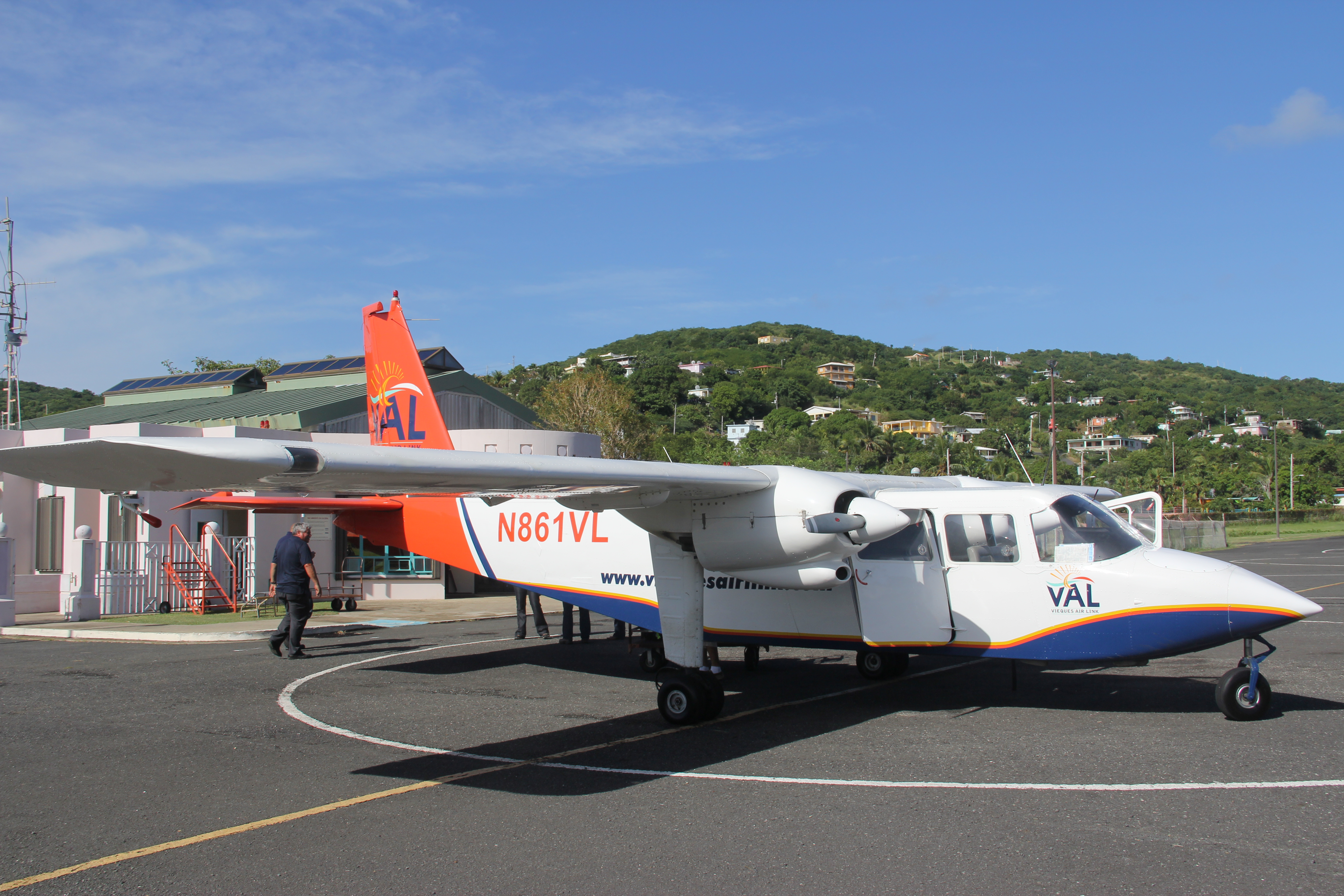
- A Britten-Norman Islander similar to the aircraft involved
- Type: Britten-Norman Islander
- Operator: Air Taxi
- Registration: YJ-AL2
- Occupants: 0

Air Vanuatu Flight 241 was a regularly scheduled domestic passenger flight between Whitegrass Airport, Tanna and Bauerfield International Airport, Port Vila, Vanuatu. On 28 July 2018, over Erromango, a fire broke out in the right engine of the ATR 72-500 operating the flight. While the pilots were able to regain control, the pilots botched their response after shutting the engine down. After landing in Port Vila, the pilots tried to use reverse-thrust to taxi and collided with two Britten-Norman Islanders. Thirteen of 43 people on board were injured due to the prior engine fire.

== Background ==
=== Aircraft ===
- ATR 72 of Air Vanuatu, registration YJ-AV71. MSN 720. The aircraft first flew on 6 June 2005. At the time of the accident, it had accumulated 19,887 hours and 39 minutes of flight time.
- Britten-Norman Islander of Unity Airlines, registration YJ-OO9, MSN 65. The aircraft had first flown on 11 April 1969.
- Britten-Norman Islander of Air Taxi, registration YJ-AL2, MSN 609. It had first flown in 1971.

=== Passengers and crew ===
On board Flight 241 were 39 and four crew members:

- The pilot in command was a 34-year-old French captain. He had logged a total of 7,205 flight hours, 3,870 of which were on ATR 72 models.
- The pilot monitoring was a 27-year-old ni-Vanuatu first officer. He had logged a total of 1,629 flight hours, only 55 of which were on ATR 72 models.

== Flight ==
Flight 241 was a domestic scheduled passenger flight from Whitegrass Airport, Tanna to Bauerfield International Airport, Port Vila Vanuatu. On 28 July 2018, the ATR 72 suffered an engine fire in the right engine while over the island of Erromango. Passengers witnessed a fire in the engine and reported smoke in the cabin. The aircraft temporarily went into an uncontrolled roll before the crew regained control and shut the engine down.

Upon landing in Port Villa, the aircraft departed the runway and collided with two Britten-Norman Islander aircraft belonging to Air Taxi and Unity Airlines. The Air Taxi aircraft was severely damaged, with its vertical stabilizer ripped off. It was damaged beyond repair. The Unity Airlines plane was also damaged beyond repair. Although nobody was injured in the collision, thirteen passengers were treated for smoke inhalation due to the prior fire.

All four crew and 39 passengers on board evacuated the aircraft without injury. The pilots of the ATR 72 reported that they had no brakes or nose wheel steering, which they gave as the reason for the runway excursion and subsequent collision.

== Investigation ==
The Civil Aviation Authority of Vanuatu requested Papua New Guinea's Accident Investigation Commission to investigate the accident. Canada's Transportation Safety Board also assisted the investigation.

The preliminary report was released by the commission on August 10, 2018, which discarded several potential causes, such as weather conditions. The report also revealed no signs of a fire occurring before or after the crash. Survival factors were also analyzed, such as how well the evacuation was executed.

According to the preliminary report, the aircraft suffered substantial damage to the propellers and right landing gear after it struck and tore off the vertical stabilizer and rudder of the first Britten Norman Islander. The ATR-72's right landing gear then crushed the fuselage of another Islander, destroying it.

=== Causes ===
The Papua New Guinea Accident Investigation Commission released their final report on October 29, 2019. The report stated that the engine failure was not the direct cause of the accident.

Following the engine fire, smoke inside the cabin led the pilots to declare an emergency and begin immediate descent. The smoke activated the "ELEC SMK" (electric smoke) warning, an ambiguous system to the two pilots. The pilot in command (PIC) became distracted in trying to identify and correct the warning.

The co-pilot attempted to rectify the warning by going through the "Electrical Smoke" checklist. His inexperience and introverted personality left the PIC to manage most of the emergency in a blatant failure of crew resource management.

A part of the "Electrical Smoke" checklist was another checklist known as "QRH SMOKE" which lacked information. The lack of information and the burden falling to one person caused the pilots to not consider other issues and instead followed the checklist.

As part of the QRH checklist, the generator powering the Alternating Current Wild was shut down. This isolated the direct current bus tie contractor, triggering a loss of power in hydraulic systems, including the brakes, and activation of further warning lights. This further distracted the crew, who then started the wrong pre-landing checklist.

The isolation of the DC bus and the still shut-down right engine caused all systems powered by the right DC to shut down due to a lack of power. This then further activated more warnings, reducing situational awareness as pilots attempted to address these further problems

This lack of situational awareness led the pilots to use reverse thrust while on the ground, despite both the aircraft's brakes and ground control being unavailable. The pilots were not aware of their lack of brakes, and quickly lost control before striking the two Britten-Norman Islanders.

== Aftermath ==
Following the accident, the Papua New Guinea Accident Investigation Commission released two safety recommendations to Air Vanuatu, focusing on pilot and cabin crew training.

== See also ==
- BKS Air Transport Flight C.6845, similar accident in which an aircraft crash-landed and collided with two parked aircraft.
