= Qantas Flight LW =

1951 aviation accident

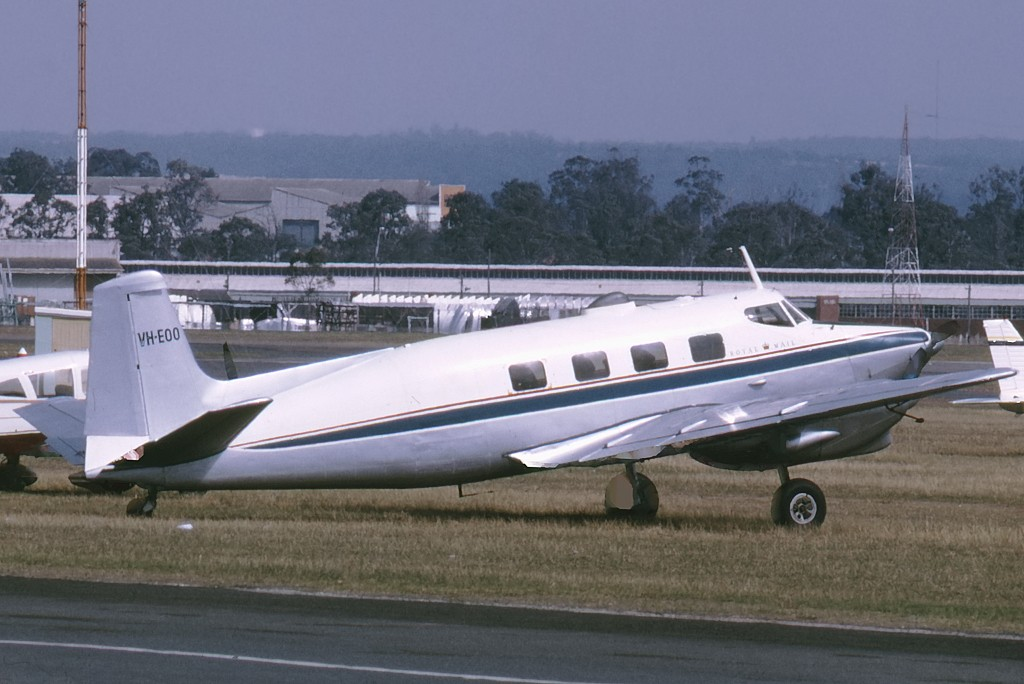
- A DHA-3 Drover, the aircraft type involved in the accident

Accident
- Date: 16 July 1951
- Summary: Loss of control due to structural failure
- Site: Huon Gulf near Lae, Papua New Guinea

Aircraft
- Aircraft type: de Havilland Australia DHA-3 Drover
- Operator: Qantas
- Registration: VH-EBQ
- Flight origin: Wau Airport, Wau, Territory of Papua and New Guinea
- Stopover: Bulolo Airport, Bulolo, Territory of Papua and New Guinea
- Destination: Lae Nadzab Airport, Lae, Territory of Papua and New Guinea
- Occupants: 7
- Passengers: 6
- Crew: 1
- Fatalities: 7
- Survivors: 0

Qantas Flight LW was a scheduled passenger flight from Wau to Lae, with a stop in Bulolo, within Papua New Guinea. On 16 July 1951, a de Havilland Australia DHA-3 Drover operating the flight crashed whilst approaching Lae Nadzab Airport, killing all 7 occupants on board. The investigation determined the crash was caused by a structural failure which caused the pilot to lose control of the aircraft.

== Aircraft ==
The aircraft involved was a 1950-built de Havilland Australia DHA-3 Drover, delivered to Qantas on 13 September 1950. The aircraft was based in Lae, located within the Australian-administrated territory of Papua and New Guinea. At the time of the accident, the aircraft had accumulated 200 flight hours.

The aircraft was initially meant to be sent to the de Havilland parent company in Hatfield, Hertfordshire for a European sales tour, with the registration G-ALLK, however it was instead delivered to Qantas.

== Passengers and crew ==
The aircraft was piloted by John William Spear, 30, a former Royal Australian Air Force pilot for five years, and was awarded with the Distinguished Flying Cross. The aircraft carried 6 passengers - four Australians and two Americans. The two American passengers had visited Wau to consecrate a new church there.

== Flight chronology ==
The aircraft departed Bulolo at 08:35 for Lae. After 31 minutes, notified the ground controllers about his position over the Markham River. The aircraft was flying in two miles of visibility due to rain fall in the area. Air traffic controller had notified the pilot of poor weather and rain, but that the airport remained operational. The aircraft then lost control and crashed in the Huon Gulf, 4 miles south of Lae Airport, killing all 7 onboard. Just before the aircraft crashed, the pilot notified Lae ground control that he was landing in 5 minutes. This was the last message from the aircraft before the crash.

Once the flight was overdue, planes were sent to search for the missing aircraft. A Douglas aircraft located wreckage in 50-feet deep waters. A Department of Civil Aviation boat later that afternoon managed to recover the bodies of two passengers, and some aircraft debris, including a wheel. A diver from Finschhafen was sent to inspect the aircraft's other pieces of wreckage, and recover the remaining bodies.

£35,000 worth of gold ingots was onboard the flight, however, attempts to salvage them were unsuccessful.

== Investigation and further incidents ==
Shortly after the crash, Qantas's Inspector of Accidents, J.R. Byrne, left Sydney to assist the airline's Lae-based staff with the investigation. Initially the accident was attributed to pilot error due to the pilot continuing the flight in low cloud and rain. The central propeller with a missing blade was found at the crash site, however this damage was believed to have been attributed to the impact.

On 16 April 1952, a Department of Civil Aviation DHA-3 Drover, VH-DHA (piloted by Clarrie R. Hibbert) was involved in an accident, which involved parts of a propeller breaking off and penetrating the fuselage, severely injuring the pilot's foot, and rendering him unconscious. Passenger Tom Drury, a DCA inspector and licensed pilot, made a ditching, and all 3 occupants were rescued by a RAAF crash boat the following morning. This then renewed the investigation of the 1951 crash. The Civil Aviation Department believed that these accidents could be attributed to faults in the propellers. It was announced that all DHA-3 Drovers would be temporarily grounded and would have their propellers sent to Sydney for examination.

The DHA-3 Drover was known to have issues with engine-propeller vibrations. At full load, the DHA-3 Drover could not maintain height with two engines. Vibrations would increase to "worrying levels" with the nose engine stopped. The aircraft model had a number of accidents and incidents involving engine issues and unaccounted fuel starvations since the accident. On 11 September 1952, another Qantas DHA-3 Drover (VH-EBS) had its nose propeller snap off during takeoff, pulling its engine out. The aircraft successfully aborted the takeoff. This immediately resulted in all DHA-3 Drovers being grounded again in Queensland, per advice from the Civil Aviation Department Headquarters in Melbourne, and soon nationwide. A Civil Aviation Department expert and a Qantas officer was sent from Brisbane to investigate the incident.

Further investigations into the 1951 crash revealed that a blade in the central propeller had broken off due to a structural failure which resulted in the engine being pulled out from its mounting, causing the pilot to lose control and crash into the sea.

== Aftermath ==
After the September 1952 incident, all DHA-3 Drovers were grounded. During the grounding, new propellers were designed and fitted on the DHA-3 Drovers. This resulted in the Drovers having a reduced load limit, which was soon improved with the installment of slotted flaps. All modified Drovers were known as the Mk. 2. Despite these changes, the DHA-3 Drover's reputation was already damaged, with Qantas declining to take delivery of its final two DHA-3 Drovers, and eventually selling 5 of its existing Drovers to Fiji Airways.
