= Lamen Bay Airport =

Airport in Vanuatu

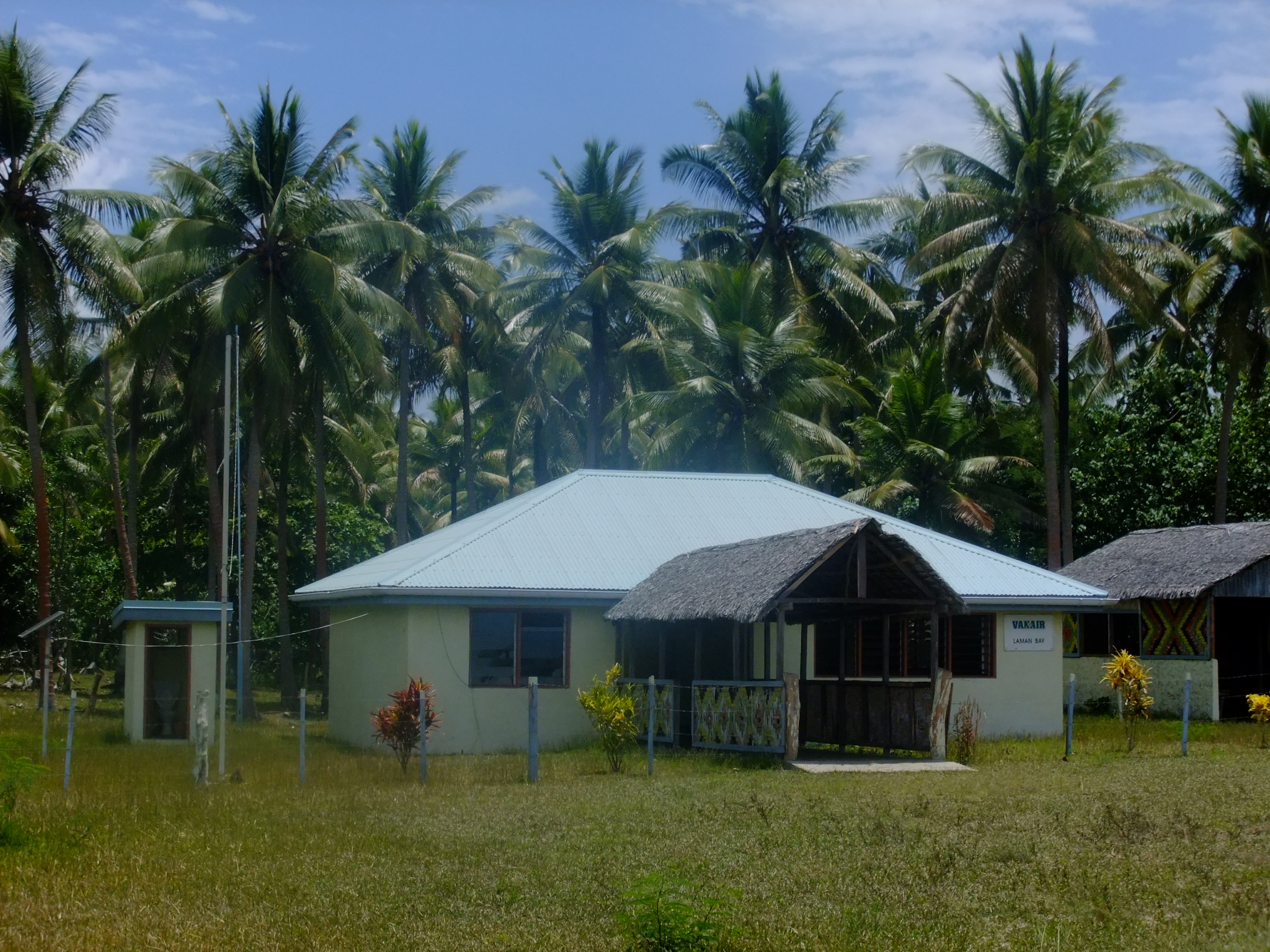
- IATA: LNB; ICAO: NVSM

Summary
- Airport type: Public
- Serves: Lamen Bay, Epi, Vanuatu
- Elevation AMSL: 7 ft (2.1 m)
- Coordinates: 16°35′03″S 168°09′33″E

Map
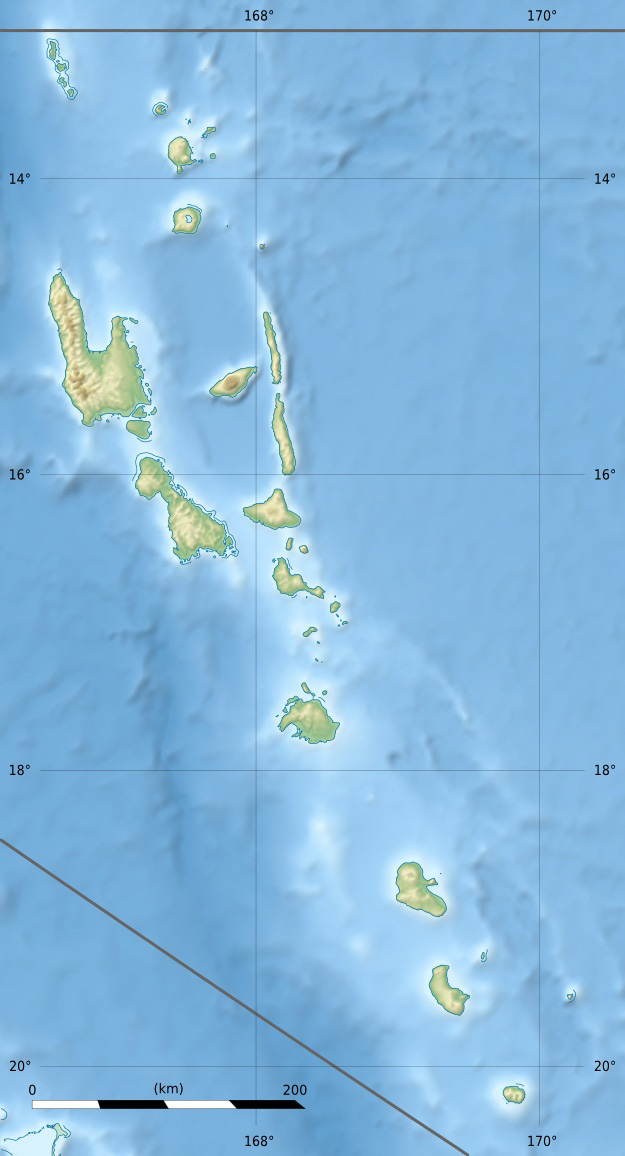
- Location of airport in Vanuatu

Runways
Direction	Length		Surface
Direction	m	ft	Surface
	850	2,789

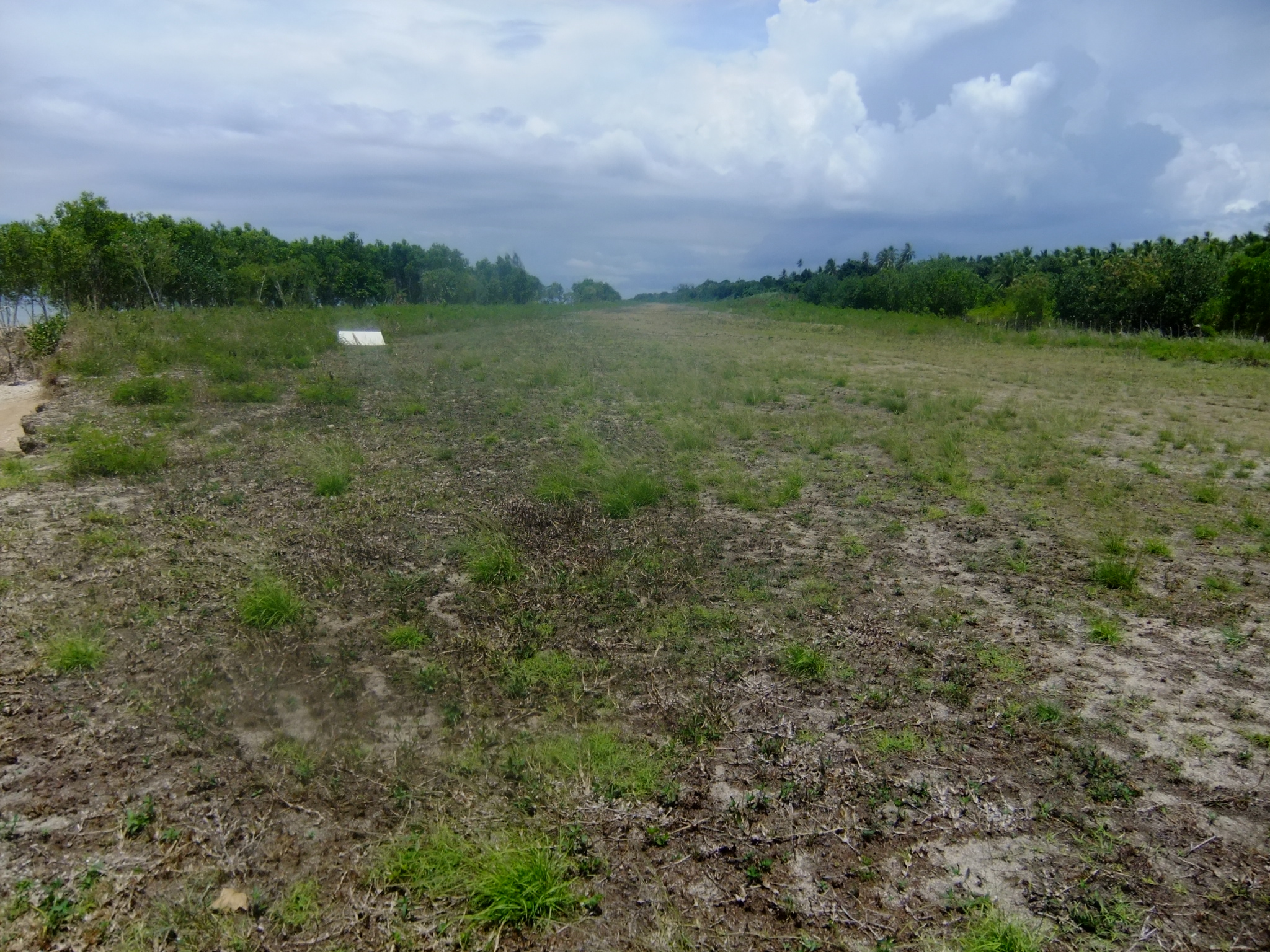
The runway

Lamen Bay Airport (IATA: LNB, ICAO: NVSM) is an airport in Lamen Bay on Epi, Vanuatu.

== Airlines and destinations ==
Air Vanuatu connects Lamen Bay Airport to Port Vila International Airport.
