= De Havilland Australia DHA-3 Drover =

Australian small transport aircraft

DHA-3 Drover
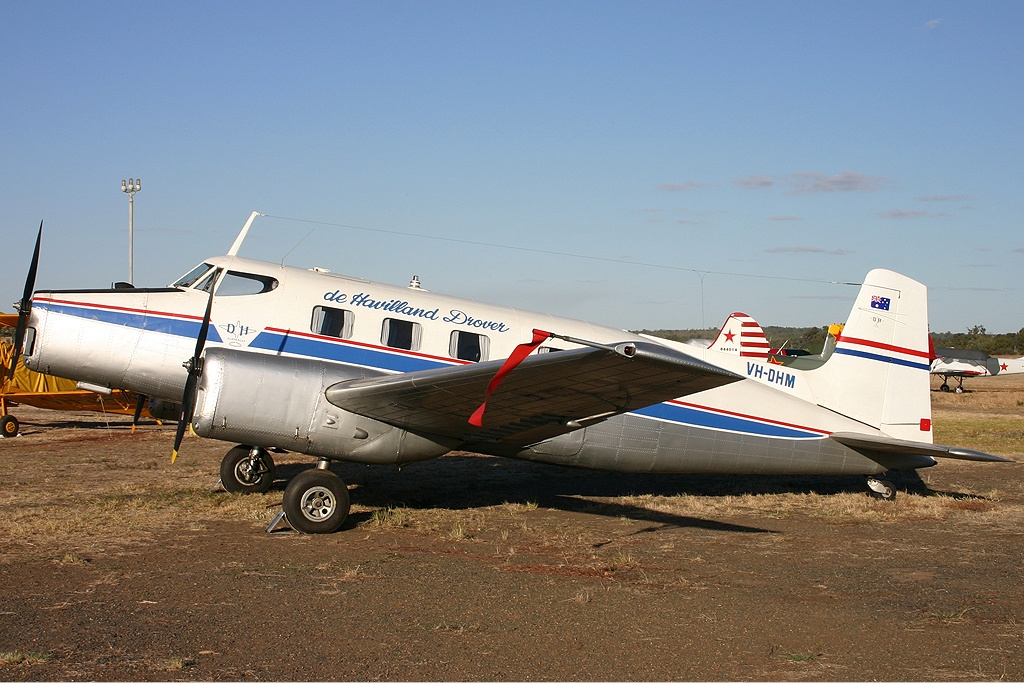
- DHA-3 Mk. 2 Drover

General information
- Type: Short-haul airliner
- National origin: Australia
- Manufacturer: de Havilland Australia
- Status: Four registered in Australia
- Primary users: Royal Flying Doctor Service of Australia Qantas
- Number built: 20

History
- Manufactured: 1949–1953
- Introduction date: 1949
- First flight: 23 January 1948
- Developed from: de Havilland Dove

The de Havilland Australia DHA-3 Drover is a small transport aircraft that was built by de Havilland Australia (DHA) in the 1940s and 1950s. The aircraft had some similarities with the two-engine British-built de Havilland Dove but used a trimotor configuration.

== Design and development ==
Design work on the DHA-3 began in 1946 after DHA identified a need to replace the de Havilland Dragon biplane then in widespread use in Australia. Although the British parent company's Dove was being produced at the same time, DHA saw that the Dove was not entirely suitable for Australian conditions. Using the Dove as a starting point, DHA designed an aircraft with three four-cylinder Gipsy Major engines instead of the Dove's two Gipsy Queen six-cylinder engines and a fixed tailwheel undercarriage instead of the Dove's retractable tricycle undercarriage. Like the Dove the DHA-3 was sized to carry 8 to 9 passengers with a single pilot.

The result was an aircraft with the same wingspan as the Dove and a slightly shorter fuselage. The name 'Drover' was selected by Sir Geoffrey de Havilland after suggestions for a name were invited from DHA employees. Thomas King from the Drawing Office came up with the winning name. The first DHA-3 Mk. 1 Drover took to the air at Bankstown Airport on 23 January 1948 piloted by Brian (Black Jack) Walker, DHA's chief test pilot. The aircraft was subsequently flown by Walker to Melbourne for trials by the Australian Department of Civil Aviation, a flight of 460 miles, achieving 140 mph and a fuel consumption of approximately 22 gallons per-hour. During trials a rate-of-climb of 240 feet per-minute at sea level with one engine inoperative was obtained.

The second aircraft did not fly until December 1949, while the first aircraft was delivered in October that year.

After entering service, by 1952 the type's shortcomings were becoming apparent. These included the aircraft's lack of power, especially in hot weather, and an unfortunate tendency for propellers to fail in-flight, resulting in the loss of two aircraft. The propeller problem was overcome by replacing the de Havilland variable-pitch propellers with Fairey-Reed fixed-pitch propellers, modified aircraft being re-designated the DHA-3 Mk. 1F. All but the three aircraft that had crashed by that time were brought to this standard. The propeller change however did nothing to improve the type's performance. In a bid to improve take-off and landing performance all Mk. 1F aircraft were further modified with slotted flaps in place of plain flaps and were once again re-designated, this time as the DHA-3 Mk. 2.

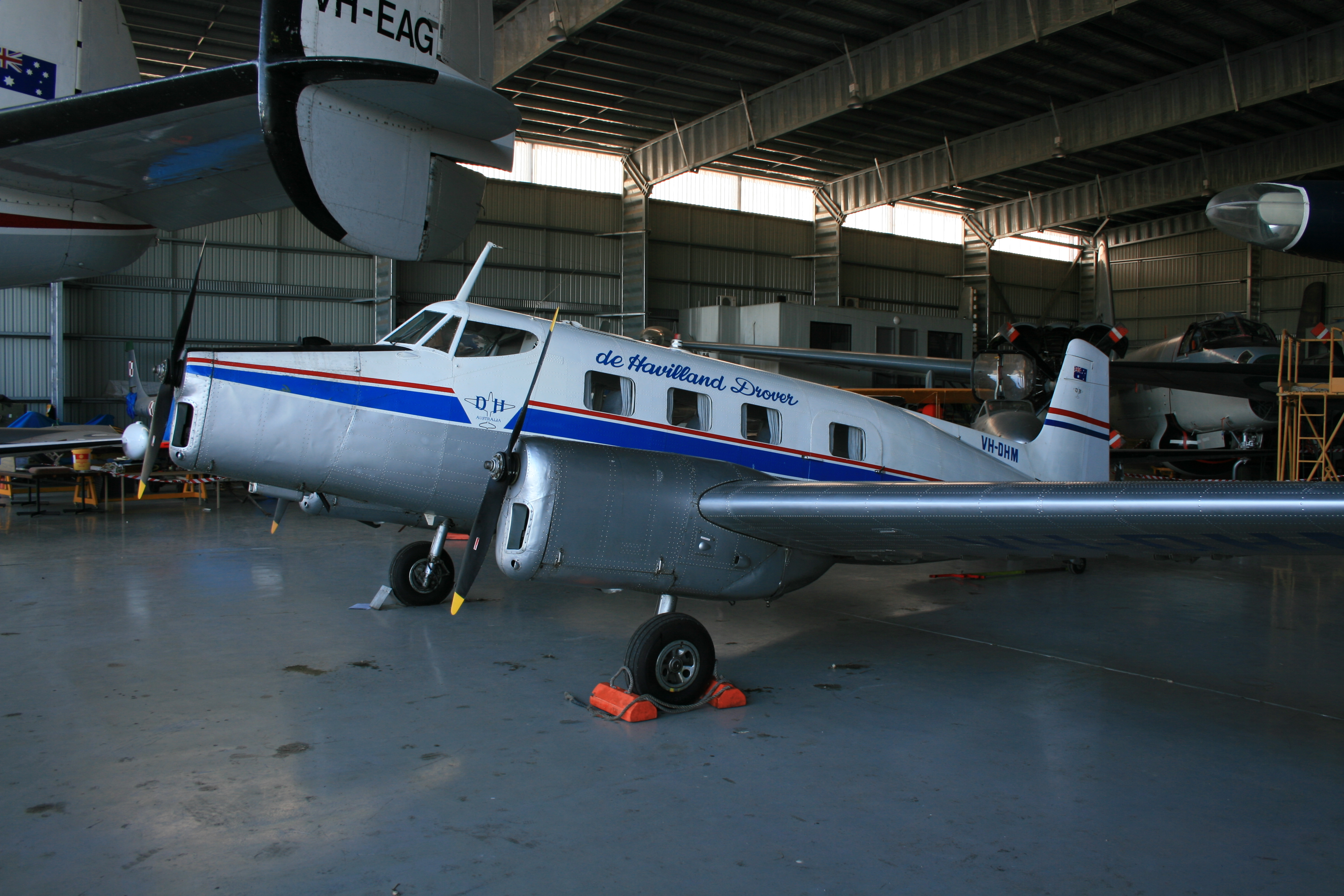
A Mark 2 Drover with Gipsy engines and fixed-pitch propellers

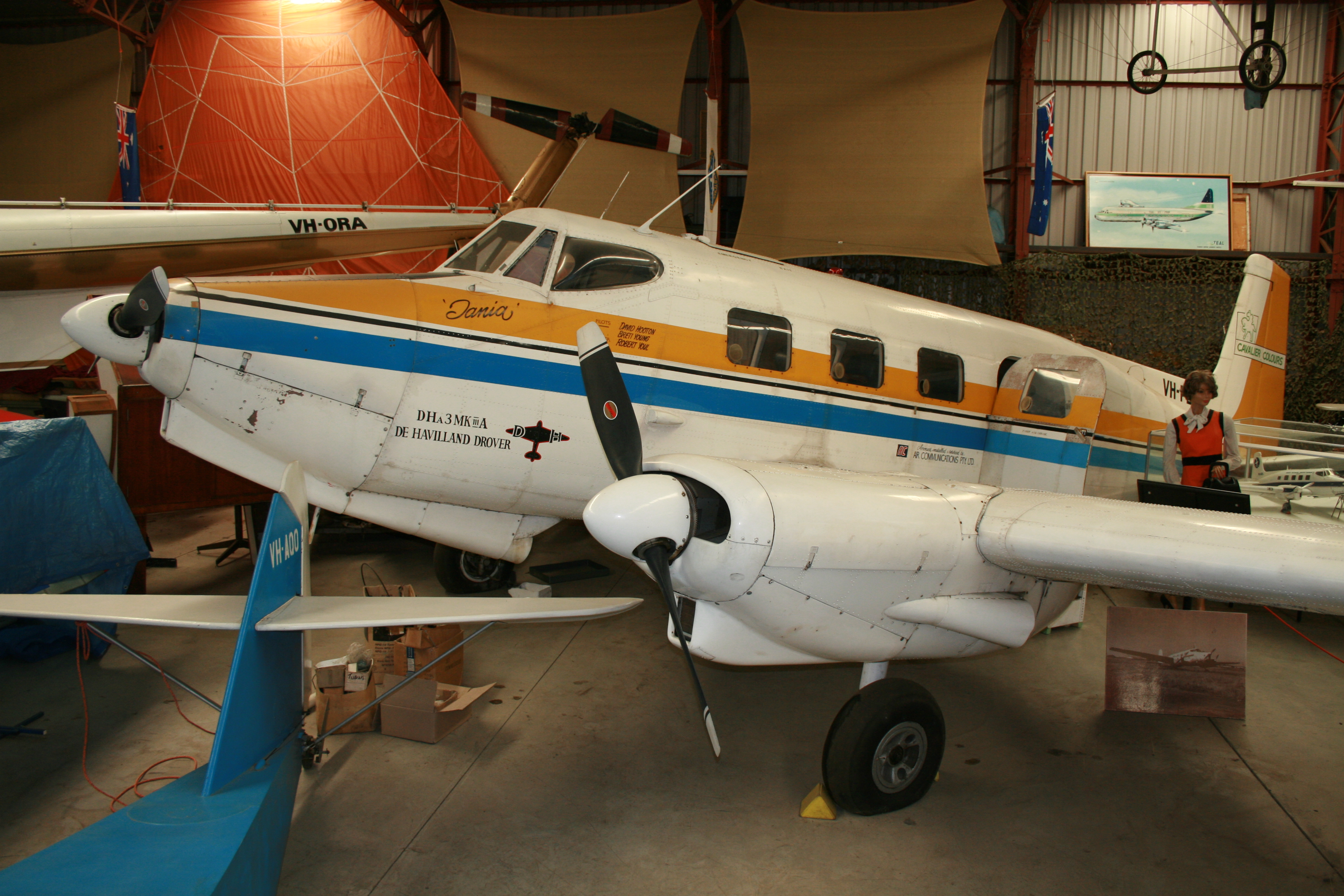
The Powerhouse Museum's DHA-3 Mk. 3a Drover at Bankstown Airport

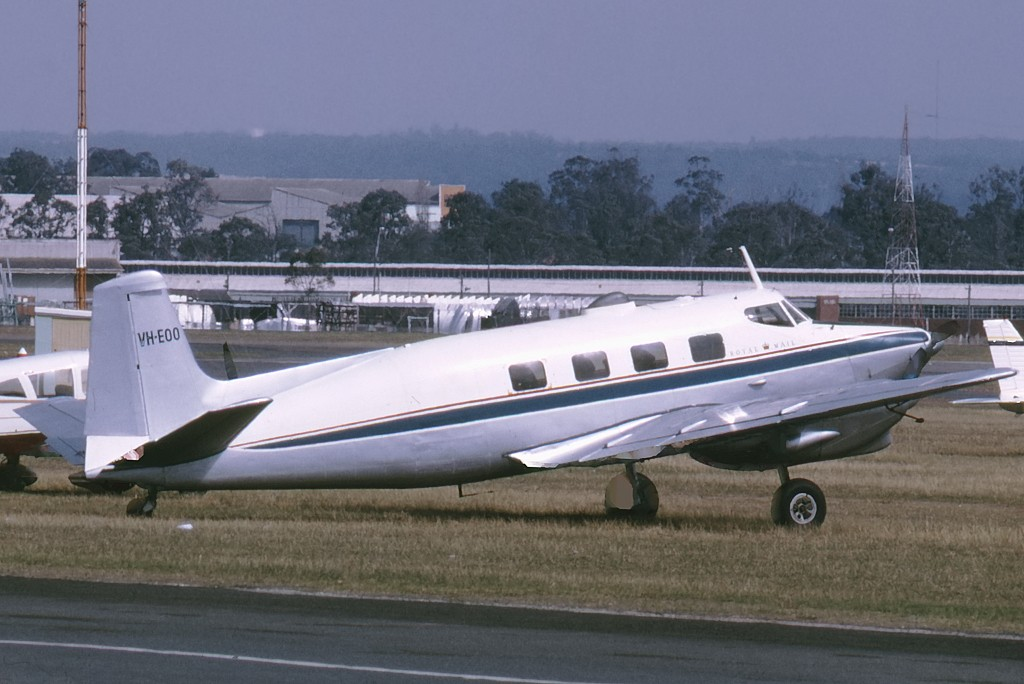
Drover 3B, with Lycoming O-360 engines, at Bankstown Airport in 1970

Sixteen aircraft had been delivered by the end of 1952, but the problems suffered by the type stalled further sales for several years. The last four of the twenty Drovers built were produced in 1953 but were not sold until 1955 and 1956. In another bid to rectify the type's poor performance DHA re-engined seven Mk. 2 aircraft with Lycoming O-360 horizontally-opposed engines driving Hartzell feathering constant-speed propellers. Changes were also made to the flap control system and the tail wheel assembly. The first modified aircraft, re-designated as a DHA-3 Mk. 3, was returned to its owner the Royal Flying Doctor Service of Australia (RFDS) on 4 June 1960. Three Mk. 3s were later further modified; two aircraft operated by the NSW Section of the RFDS were modified in 1962 as the Mk. 3a with the tailplane altered to have seven degrees of dihedral (14° according to one source) and the span increased by 2 ft (61 cm). The third was modified as a Mk. 3b with an increase in MTOW of 300 lb (137 kg) to 6,800 lb (3,087 kg).

== Operational history ==
=== New aircraft deliveries ===
The type entered service with the Australian Department of Civil Aviation (DCA, now the Civil Aviation Safety Authority) in 1949, the DCA operating the first two aircraft. Qantas and the RFDS took delivery of their first aircraft in 1950, eventually receiving five and six new aircraft respectively. Qantas placed the Drover into service on its routes in what was then known as the Territory of Papua and New Guinea. Like many other aircraft types before and since, the Drover was inadequate in the demanding operating conditions of the island and of the surviving four aircraft (see below), three left Qantas service in 1954 and 1955. The last was retired by Qantas in 1960. The surviving DCA aircraft (see below) was also withdrawn and offered for sale in the latter 1950s and was sold at the end of 1959.

Trans Australia Airlines (TAA) briefly evaluated the prototype for a month in late 1950 and then received the first two of its eventual three new Drovers in 1952 (the third was delivered in 1956). TAA operated them on scheduled services in Queensland and as air ambulance aircraft, one of them as one of the six used by the RFDS. One aircraft crashed in January 1952 only five weeks after delivery and the other two were transferred to the RFDS in 1963 and 1964. The last main operators of new Drovers were the Australian Department of Health, which used two on outback aeromedical operations (one crashing in 1957); and Fiji Airways, which took delivery of two aircraft built for Qantas but refused by that company when the type's problems became apparent. The last aircraft built was delivered as a Mk. 2 to a private individual in July 1956.

=== Propeller problems ===
On 16 July 1951 the third Drover built (registration VH-EBQ in service with Qantas), crashed off the coast of New Guinea (in the Huon Gulf near the mouth of the Markham River) after the centre engine's propeller failed. The pilot and the six passengers on board were killed. This was the first of three fatal crashes suffered by Qantas over a period of four months in 1951. At the time of the crash the aircraft was only ten months old.

The prototype Drover VH-DHA operated by the Australian Department of Civil Aviation was ditched in the Bismarck Sea between Wewak and Manus Island on 16 April 1952. The port propeller failed, a propeller blade penetrated the fuselage and the pilot was rendered unconscious; the ditching was performed by a passenger. On this occasion the three occupants survived the ordeal to be rescued.

A third aircraft (VH-EBS, also owned by Qantas) suffered a propeller failure while still on the ground in September the same year.

=== Later operations ===
The RFDS had its Drovers modified to Mk. 3 standard in the early 1960s and operated the type until late in the decade when more modern aircraft such as the Beechcraft Queen Air were acquired. The seventh Mk. 3 was acquired second-hand from the Department of Health by the RFDS as a Mk. 2 and then modified. The RFDS Mk. 3s were configured to carry the pilot, two medical staff and two stretcher patients and were operated in the Northern Territory and outback New South Wales and Queensland.

Apart from their initial use in Australia, New Guinea and Fiji already mentioned; second-hand Drovers were registered in the Western Pacific Islands (Solomon Islands) and operated by New Hebrides Airways and Air Melanesiae in the New Hebrides, and others were registered in New Zealand and the United Kingdom in addition to further examples making their way to Fiji.

By the end of the 1950s only nine Drovers were still in airline service worldwide. The last Drover to operate scheduled airline services in New Zealand was with Great Barrier Airlines. It was withdrawn from service in 1985 and replaced by a BN2A Islander.

The final Drover built was modified in the late 1960s as an agricultural aircraft, flying for several years from Toowoomba, Queensland with a large hopper installed in the cabin. This Mk. 2 Drover was restored by apprentices and staff of Hawker de Havilland in 1984–86 and was still airworthy in 2008, being operated as VH-DHM from Illawarra Regional Airport by the Historical Aircraft Restoration Society on behalf of Hawker de Havilland Aerospace, now a part of Boeing.

Despite the small number produced the Drover survives in healthy numbers; in addition to VH-DHM already mentioned another three are on the Australian civil aircraft register as of November 2008 – a Mk. 3 and two Mk. 2s. Another Mk. 2, a composite of the 10th and 17th aircraft built, is on display at the RFDS Base at Mount Isa, Queensland while one of the Mk. 3a aircraft (owned by the Powerhouse Museum) can be seen at the Australian Aviation Museum at Bankstown Airport. The Central Australian Aviation Museum at Alice Springs has a Mk. 3 in its collection. Another Mk. 2 was in a museum at Lasham in England until its closure. It is now in storage at Parkhouse Engineering in Booker. The Queensland Air Museum at Caloundra Airport has two Mk. 3s.

== Variants ==
- Drover Mk. 1: Manufactured with variable-pitch propellers.
- Drover Mk. 1F: Modified with fixed-pitch propellers.
- Drover Mk. 2: Modified with double-slotted flaps.
- Drover Mk. 3: Re-engined with three Lycoming O-360-A1A horizontally-opposed engines.
  - Mk. 3a: Fitted with modified tailplane of increased span and dihedral.
  - Mk. 3b: MTOW increased to 6,800 lb (3,087 kg).

== Operators ==
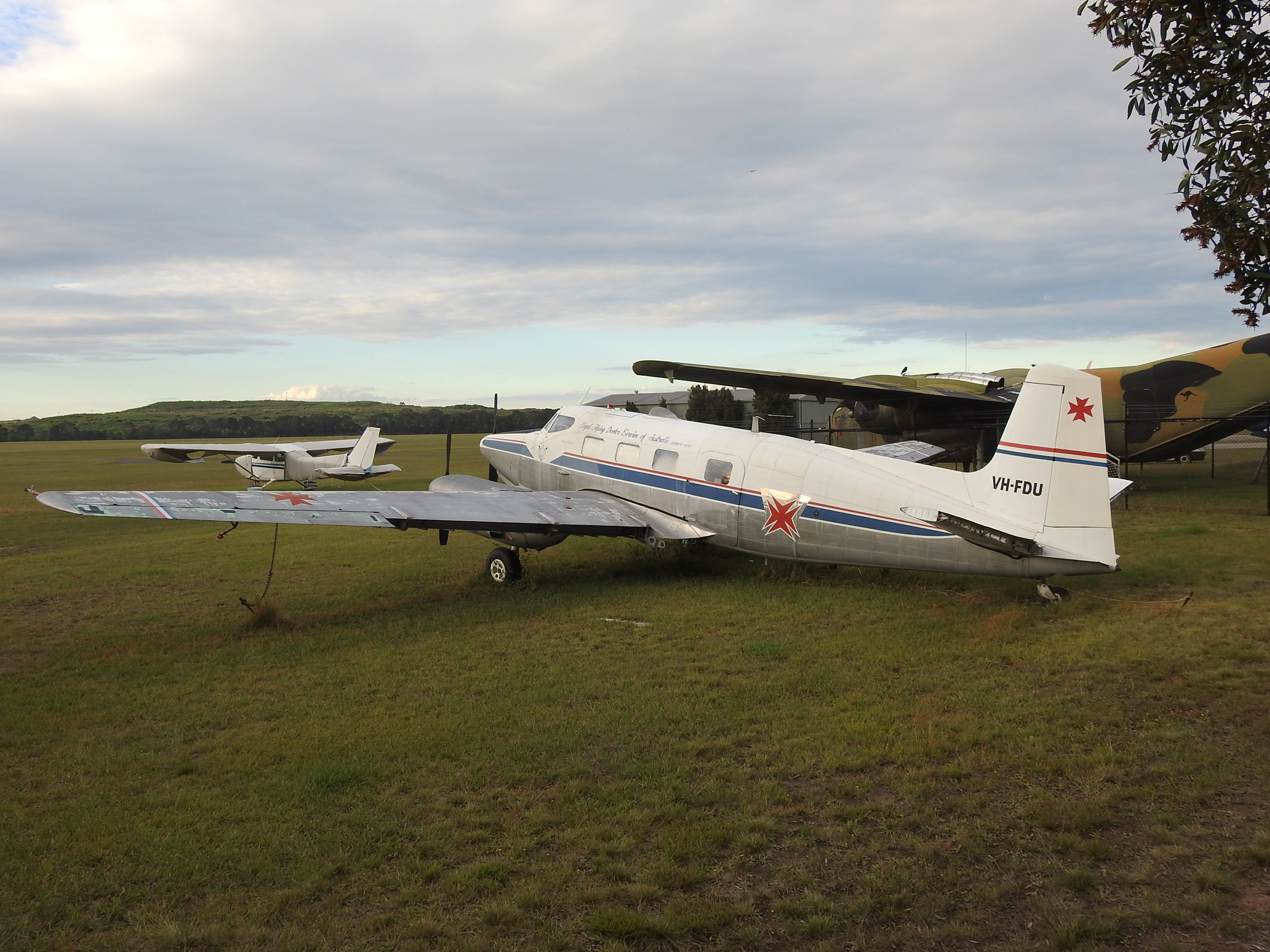
Old Royal Flying Doctor Service VH-FDU 'George Simpson' at Caboolture Airfield, Queensland (2021)

Australia

- Department of Civil Aviation
- Royal Australian Air Force Aircraft Research and Development Unit
- Department of Health
- Qantas
- Royal Flying Doctor Service
- Trans Australia Airlines (TAA)

Fiji

- Fiji Airways

(United Kingdom) / (France) New Hebrides (Vanuatu)

- New Hebrides Airways
- Air Melanesiae

New Zealand

- Great Barrier Airlines

== Specifications (DHA-3 Mk.3 Drover) ==
Data from Jane's All the World's Aircraft 1962-63.

General characteristics

- Crew: 1 or 2
- Capacity: 8 passengers/2 x stretchers + 2 passengers or medical attendants / 1,710 lb (776 kg) maximum payload
- Length: 36 ft 2 in (11.02 m)
- Wingspan: 57 ft (17 m)
- Height: 9 ft 9 in (2.97 m)
- Wing area: 325 sq ft (30.2 m^{2}) 10
- Airfoil: RAF 34 modified 2.5% camber
- Empty weight: 4,585 lb (2,080 kg)
- Maximum zero-fuel weight: 6,500 lb (2,948 kg)
- Maximum landing weight: 6,500 lb (2,948 kg)
- Max takeoff weight: 6,500 lb (2,948 kg)
- Powerplant: 3 × Lycoming O-360-A1A 4-cylinder air-cooled horizontally-opposed piston engines, 180 hp (130 kW) each
- Propellers: 2-bladed Hartzell HC 92 ZK-2A/8447-12A metal constant-speed feathering propellers

Performance

- Maximum speed: 192 mph (309 km/h, 167 kn)
- Cruise speed: 144 mph (232 km/h, 125 kn) maximum

126 mph (109 kn; 203 km/h) economical cruise at 63^

- Stall speed: 65 mph (105 km/h, 56 kn) max fuel, 45 minutes reserve
- Minimum control speed: 212 mph (341 km/h, 184 kn)
- Range: 540 mi (870 km, 470 nmi)
- Service ceiling: 15,200 ft (4,600 m)

6,200 ft (1,890 m) with one engine inoperative

- Maximum zero-fuel weight: 6,500 lb (2,948 kg)
- Rate of climb: 1,000 ft/min (5.1 m/s)
- Wing loading: 20 lb/sq ft (98 kg/m^{2})
- Power/mass: 0.833 hp/lb (1.369 kW/kg)
- Take-off run: 865 ft (264 m)
- Take-off distance to 50 ft (15 m): 1,400 ft (427 m)
- Landing run: 685 ft (209 m)
- Landing distance from 50 ft (15 m): 1,570 ft (479 m)
