= Dennis Buchanan =

Australian airline owner in Papua New Guinea

Ranald Dennis Buchanan
- Born: 6 November 1932; Sydney, Australia
- Died: 29 August 2001 (aged 68); Brisbane, Australia
- Occupation: Entrepreneur
- Known for: Ownership and management of Talair airline in Papua New Guinea
- Spouse: Della Brown
- Children: Nine

Sir Ronald "Dennis" Buchanan MBE (1932–2001) was the owner of several airlines in Oceania, most notably Talair in Papua New Guinea (PNG). He was also a publisher and served one term in the country's pre-Independence National Assembly.

== Early life ==
Buchanan was born on 6 November 1932 in Sydney, Australia, being the second-youngest of nine children of Brisbane and Jessie Buchanan. His mother died when he was six years old. In early 1942, he and Lilla, his youngest sister, were sent to live with their uncle on a dairy farm in the Hunter Valley of New South Wales, attending a one-teacher school with about one dozen pupils. At the end of 1943, he returned to Sydney to complete his primary education, living with a family friend. His father then enrolled him at All Saints' College, Bathurst, a boarding school where he obtained an Intermediate Certificate in 1948.

== Aviation career ==
In June 1949 Bobby Gibbes of Gibbes Sepik Airways (GSA), Territory of Papua and New Guinea, who had also attended All Saints' College, sought a young man to work for him in the Territory. The school bursar recommended Buchanan. He flew to Wewak in December 1949, together with Gibbes. In 1955, aged 23 years, while still working at GSA, Buchanan formed a partnership to grow coffee near Goroka, multiplying his investment sixfold within about a year.

In January 1958, Buchanan purchased Territory Airlines Pty Ltd (TAL), which was based in Goroka. When Buchanan bought TAL, the company, which had started in 1952, had just two planes. Living in Goroka, he initially built up a fleet of mainly Cessna planes, which were suited to conditions in the highlands of New Guinea, earning himself a reputation as an astute buyer of aircraft. By June 1969, he had 21 aircraft. In 1974, he changed the name of Territory Airlines to Talair, in order to reflect the forthcoming Independence of PNG in 1975. At its peak, Talair had 70 aircraft and over 1,000 employees, serving 150 airports in a country largely dependent on air travel, and was the country's most important airline after the national flag carrier, Air Niugini. This was achieved, in part, through his ability to command the loyalty of his staff, despite his tendency to frequently sack staff on a whim, only to rescind his decision the following day.

In addition to buying planes, Buchanan purchased several existing air companies in PNG, including Sepik Air Charters (in 1972); Melanesian Air Charters (1975); Panga Airways (1977); Cloudlands Aviation (1986); and Co-Air (1987). In 1968 he established Talco, in order to promote PNG tourism, transport workers to plantations on the islands of New Britain and New Ireland, and to conduct aerial spraying. In 1981, he opened Talair (Australia), running a charter operation based in Cairns, Queensland. He also expanded into other South Pacific nations, including owning and operating Solair in the Solomon Islands and Air Melanesie in Vanuatu. In 1983, Buchanan signed a contract with Aerolift Philippines. He further expanded his involvement in the Philippines and also operated an airline in Tonga.

In 1993, Buchanan closed down Talair, a result of declining economic conditions, the high cost of running a fleet with many different types of plane, and the constant need to negotiate fare increases with the government. This was one of many of his run-ins with governments and bureaucracies as he faced difficulties in obtaining approval to fly his planes out of the country. Many of his planes were eventually sold to a new airline he had established in Queensland, Flight West, which he had founded in 1987 after the closure of Australian Airlines' services in Queensland. Flight West Airlines mainly concentrated on government-subsidised flights to remote areas. Once again, he built up a substantial airline which, by the late 1990s, was carrying 400,000+ passengers per year, employing more than 400 people, with 16 planes, and flying to 34 destinations in Queensland, the Northern Territory and Norfolk Island. In 2001, Buchanan, put Flight West into voluntary administration, ceasing trading while still solvent in order that staff redundancy payments could be guaranteed.

== Political career ==
Buchanan served one term in the pre-Independence Papua New Guinea House of Assembly from 1968, representing the conservative Unite Party. He made no formal speeches but his interjections in the speeches of others became famous.

== Publisher ==
Buchanan became the owner of the daily Niugini News newspaper. This was closed down at the same time as he closed Talair in 1993.

== Death ==
Buchanan died from acute myeloid leukemia on 29 August 2001 in Brisbane. He was buried in the graveyard at St Matthews Anglican Church at Baerami NSW. He was survived by his wife, Della Brown, and their nine children. Unlike many Australians living in Papua New Guinea he had never taken on the nationality of that country.

== Awards and honours ==
Buchanan was made a Member of the Order of the British Empire (MBE) in the 1976 Queen's Birthday Honours List, for services to aviation and tourism. In 1991 New Year Honours, he was knighted by Queen Elizabeth II in recognition of his services to civil aviation in Papua New Guinea.
