= Whitegrass Airport =

Airport in Tanna, Vanuatu

Whitegrass Airport Tanna Airport
- IATA: TAH; ICAO: NVVW

Summary
- Airport type: Public
- Serves: Tanna, Taféa, Vanuatu
- Location: Whitegrass / Lénakel
- Elevation AMSL: 27 ft (8.2 m)
- Coordinates: 19°27′18″S 169°13′26″E

Map
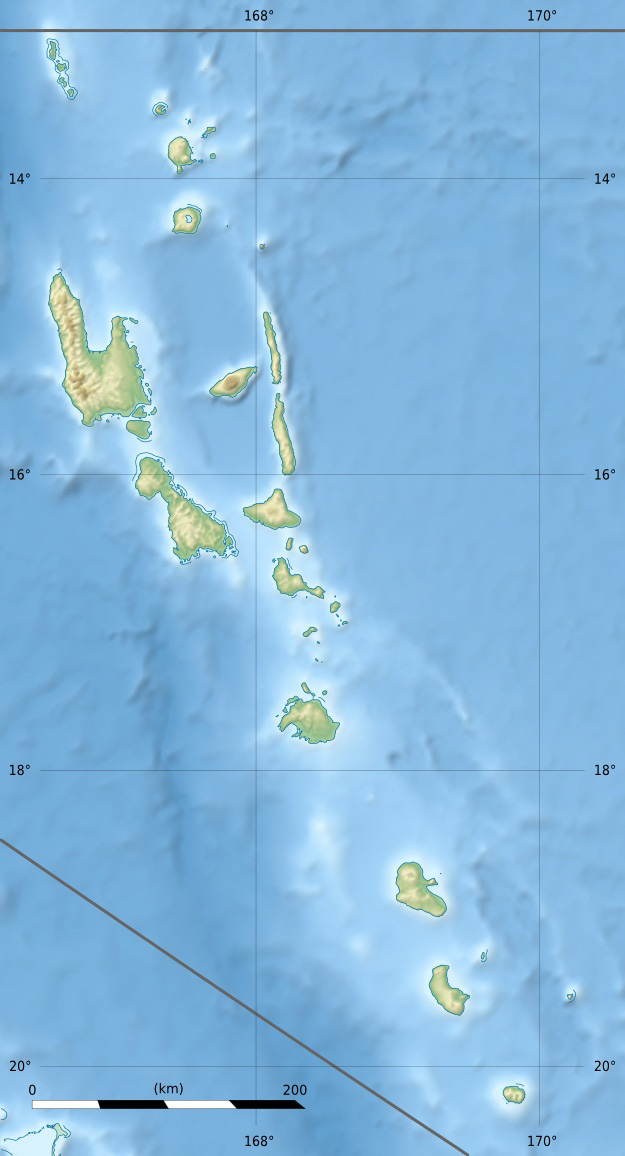
- Location of airport in Vanuatu

Runways
Direction	Length		Surface
Direction	m	ft	Surface
15/33	1,230	4,035	Asphalt
- Source: DAFIF

Whitegrass Airport (IATA: TAH, ICAO: NVVW), also known as White Grass Airport or Tanna Airport, is an airport on the island Tanna, in the Taféa province in Vanuatu.

It is located at Whitegrass (White Grass), 8 kilometres (5.0 mi) north of Lénakel township.

== Facilities ==
The airport sits at an elevation of 19 feet (6 m) above mean sea level. It has one runway designated 15/33 with an asphalt surface measuring 1,230 by 30 metres (4,035 ft × 98 ft). The airport supports small to mid-sized turboprop aircraft only.

Whitegrass Airport is one of three international airports in Vanuatu, with Customs and immigration officials stationed at Lénakel's port also covering the airport. The airport has a small terminal building and some support structures.

== Transportation ==
The airport is reached by car or van and has a small parking area behind the terminal. A paved road provides access to west side of the island and to the settlement of Lowanatom to the south.

== Airlines and destinations ==
As of November 2026, Air Vanuatu connects Whitegrass Airport to three other airports in Vanuatu: Anatom Airport serving the island of Aneityum; Futuna Airport on the island of Futuna; and Port Vila International Airport. The airline plans to add services to Aniwa Airport on the island of Aniwa and Ipota Airport on the island of Erromango in January 2027.
