= Air Vanuatu =

Flag carrier of Vanuatu

| IATA | ICAO | Call sign |
|---|---|---|
| NF | AVN | AIR VAN |
- Founded: 5 September 1981; 45 years ago
- Hubs: Bauerfield International Airport
- Frequent-flyer program: Qantas Frequent Flyer
- Parent company: Government of Vanuatu
- Headquarters: Bladiniere Estates, Port Vila, Vanuatu
- Key people: Carcasses Kalosil (Chairman); Joseph Laloyer (CEO)
- Website: www.airvanuatu.com

Air Vanuatu is a domestic airline with its head office in Air Vanuatu House, Port Vila, Vanuatu. It is Vanuatu's national flag carrier, formerly operating to Australia, New Zealand, New Caledonia and points in the South Pacific. Its main base is Bauerfield International Airport, Port Vila. In May 2024, operations ceased with the airline placed into liquidation by the Government of Vanuatu. Limited domestic services resumed in August 2024.

== History ==
=== Foundation and early years ===
Air Vanuatu was established in 1981 after Vanuatu gained independence from the United Kingdom and France the previous year. The assistance of Ansett was sought, and a five-year agreement put in place for Ansett to provide aircraft and operating staff. Ansett also took a 40% stake in the new airline, the Government of Vanuatu holding the other 60%. The first Air Vanuatu flight, a McDonnell Douglas DC-9 owned and operated by Ansett, departed Sydney for Port Vila on 5 September 1981. In May 1982, a Boeing 737-200 of Polynesian Airlines replaced the DC-9; this was replaced in turn by an Ansett 737-200 in October 1985. In March 1986, the agreement with Ansett expired and was not renewed; this had the effect of grounding the airline.

In 1987, the company was re-established with 100% ownership by the government of Vanuatu, after a new commercial agreement was signed with Australian Airlines; weekly Sydney – Port Vila flights re-commenced on 19 December using a Boeing 727-200 chartered from Australian. Air Vanuatu subsequently bought the aircraft in 1989 and leased it back to Australian for use on that airline's network on days that it was not used by Air Vanuatu. In November 1992, the 727 was replaced by a Boeing 737-400 leased from Australian Airlines. The following year an Embraer EMB 110 Bandeirante was also leased from Australian, entering service that April to operate flights between Port Vila and Nouméa. The leases on both aircraft continued after Australian was taken over by Qantas in October 1993, with the commercial agreement being rolled-over to Qantas as well. Qantas would be deeply involved in the airline's operations for the rest of its existence; Air Vanuatu used the Qantas Frequent Flyer program, while Qantas codeshared on Air Vanuatu's flights from Australia, and provided maintenance and pilot training services as well.

Air Vanuatu terminated the lease on the Qantas Boeing 737-400 after it took delivery of its own Boeing 737-300 in April 1997. The same month Bandeirante services ceased when a Saab 2000 entered service. The lease on the Saab 2000 was terminated in March 1999, and in June that year, Air Vanuatu began using a De Havilland Canada Dash 8 from Vanuatu's government-owned domestic carrier Vanair on weekly services to Nouméa.

=== 21st century ===
In April 2001, Air Vanuatu merged with Vanair, however the merger was reversed only five months later. In November 2003, an ATR 42 entered service for use on domestic routes in competition with Vanair. In September 2004, Air Vanuatu again merged with Vanair.

In January 2008, Air Vanuatu replaced its Boeing 737-300 with a new Boeing 737-800. Three Harbin Y-12s were added to the fleet in early 2009, and in October the same year the airline took delivery of a new ATR 72–500 aircraft to replace its ATR 42. Four days after the ATR 72 arrived at Port Vila, the Board of Air Vanuatu was sacked and replaced by Directors General of various Vanuatu government ministries. The ATR 72 made its first revenue flight for Air Vanuatu on 8 November 2009. A second ATR 72–500 was delivered to the airline in November 2014.

In 2016, the Harbin Y-12s were phased out and replaced by De Havilland Canada DHC-6 Twin Otters.

In July 2020, Air Vanuatu announced a major set of changes for the airline due to the COVID-19 pandemic. With the reshuffling of orders and the shrinking and localization of the management team, the CEO Derek Nice stepped down, being temporarily replaced by Joseph Laloyer, until a replacement could be found. This included delaying the delivery of the four Airbus A220 aircraft it had on order, and a strategic review of its network.

In May 2024, the airline was placed into liquidation with EY appointed as liquidator. Due to the collapse of Air Vanuatu, 1,458 ni-Vanuatu seasonal workers were left stranded in New Zealand. Immigration New Zealand confirmed that it was working with employers to support the workers. The airline owed creditors US$74 million. At the time of being placed in administration, it had six aircraft and 441 employees across Vanuatu, Australia and New Zealand. Its biggest aircraft, a leased Boeing 737, was repossessed in Melbourne. It had also been reported that only two of the airlines' aircraft remained operational, due to awaited maintenance for the remaining fleet, while the available financial information of the company was deemed "significantly out of date."

On 22 May 2024, Solomon Airlines began weekly direct flights between Auckland and Port Vila to fill the gap left by Air Vanuatu.

In August 2024, limited domestic services resumed after an injection of funds by the Government of Vanuatu.

== Destinations ==
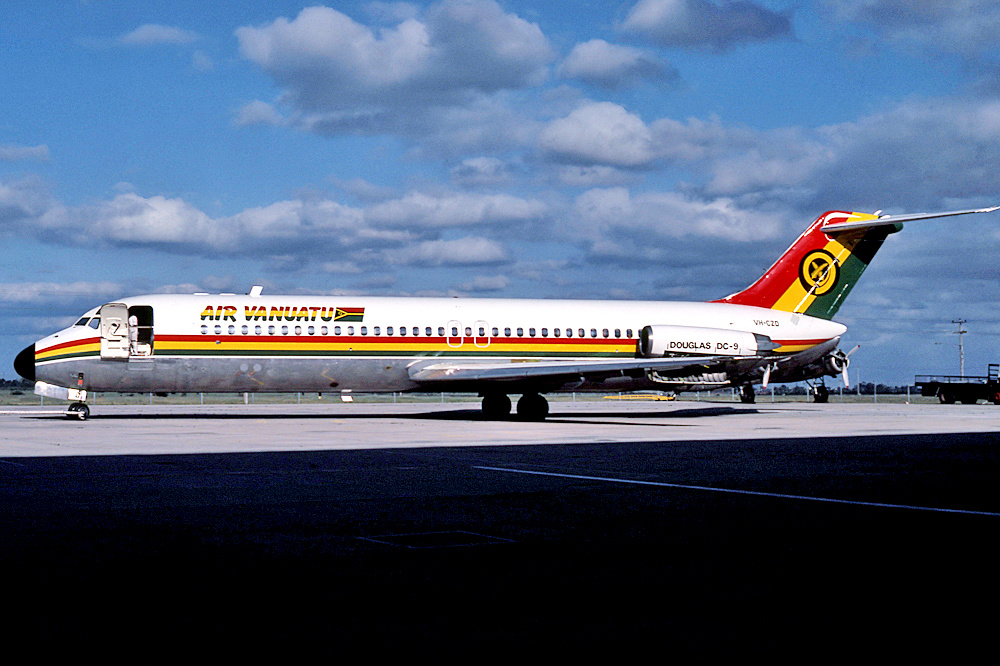
Air Vanuatu Douglas DC-9-31 (1981)

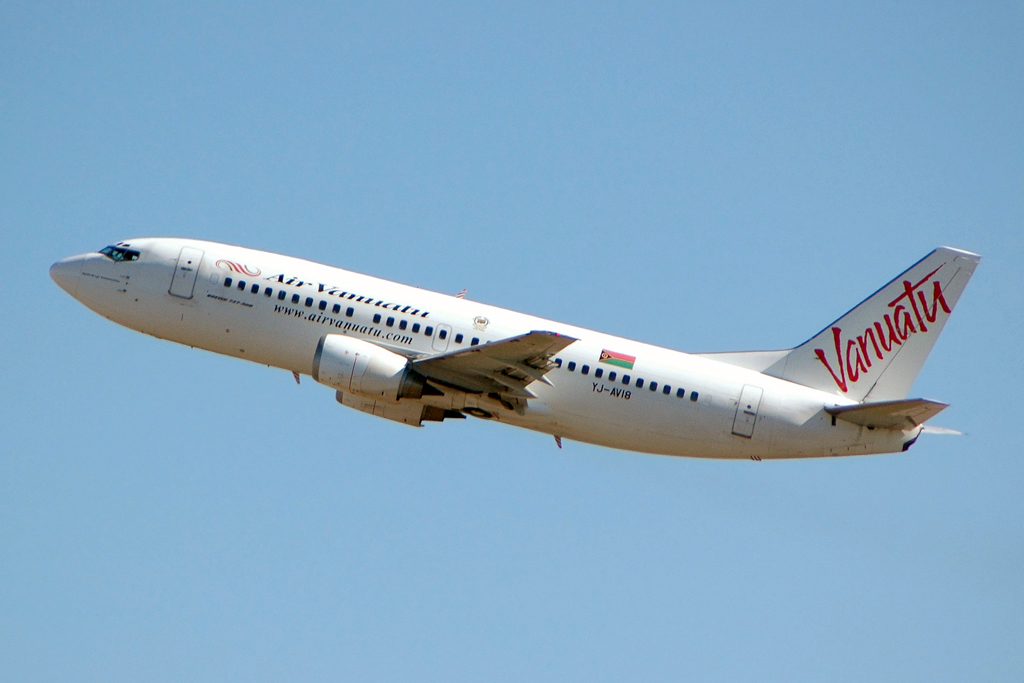
Air Vanuatu Boeing 737-300 (2006)

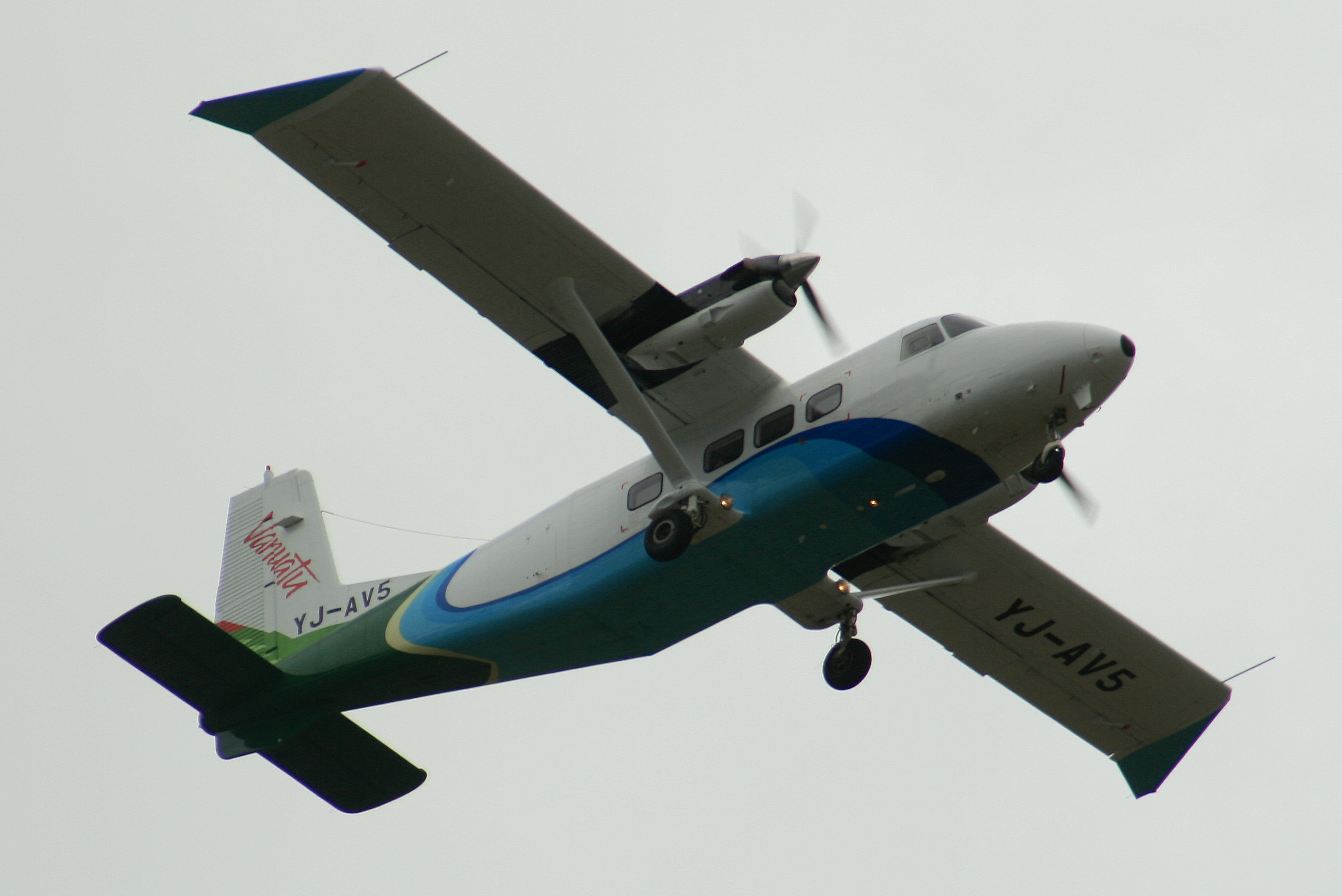
Air Vanuatu Harbin Y-12 (2009)

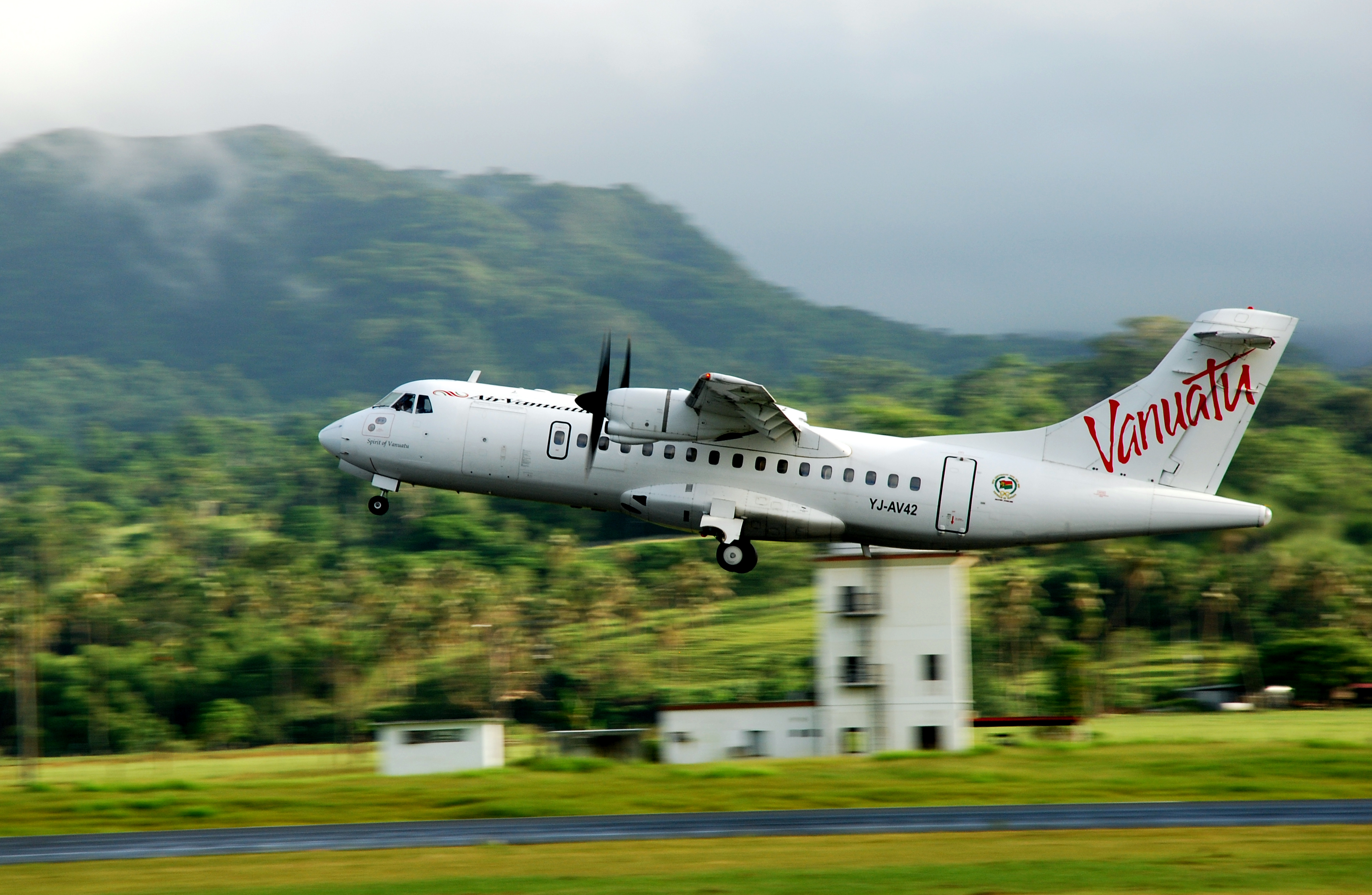
Air Vanuatu ATR 42-300 (2009)

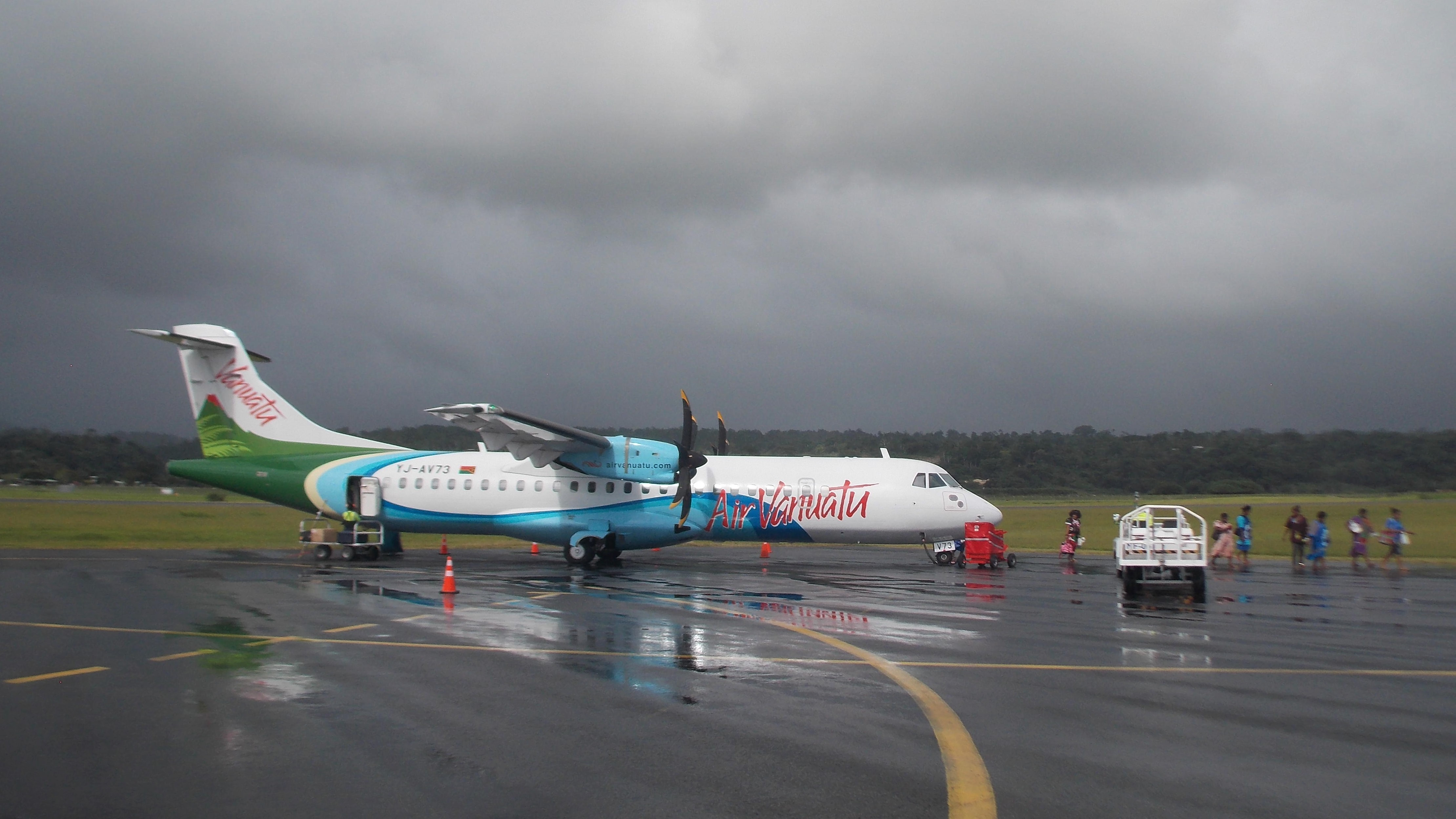
Air Vanuatu ATR 72-600 (2017)

=== Domestic destinations ===
As of November 2026, Air Vanuatu operates flights to 8 destinations in Vanuatu.

- Lamen Bay (Epi Island)
- Longana (Ambae Island)
- Lonorore (Pentecost Island)
- Norsup (Malakula Island)
- Port Vila (Efate Island – capital and main hub)
- Santo (Espiritu Santo Island / Luganville)
- Sola (Vanua Lava / Torba Province)
- Tanna (Tanna Island)

This is a considerable reduction compared to 2009, when Air Vanuatu operated up to 28 domestic routes throughout the country.

=== International destinations ===
As of July 2025, Air Vanuatu does not operate any international flights, and currently only operates within Vanuatu.

Previously, in January 2023, Air Vanuatu operated scheduled flights to the following international destinations:

| Country | City | Airport | Notes | Ref |
|---|---|---|---|---|
| Australia | Brisbane | Brisbane Airport | | |
| Australia | Melbourne | Melbourne Airport | | |
| Australia | Sydney | Sydney Airport | | |
| Fiji | Nadi | Nadi International Airport | | |
| New Caledonia | Nouméa | La Tontouta International Airport | | |
| New Zealand | Auckland | Auckland Airport | | |
| Vanuatu | Luganville | Santo-Pekoa International Airport | | |
| Vanuatu | Port Vila | Bauerfield International Airport | | |

=== Interline agreements ===
Air Vanuatu had interline agreements with the following airlines:

- Singapore Airlines

=== Codeshare agreements ===
Air Vanuatu had codeshare agreements with the following airlines:

- Aircalin
- Fiji Airways
- Solomon Airlines

== Fleet ==
As of August 2025, the Air Vanuatu fleet consisted of the following aircraft:

| Aircraft | In service | Orders | Passengers | | | Notes |
| Aircraft | In service | Orders | J | Y | Total | Notes |
|---|---|---|---|---|---|---|
| ATR 72-600 | 1 | 1 | — | 70 | 70 | |
| Britten-Norman BN-2 Islander | 1 | — | — | 9 | 9 | |
| De Havilland Canada DHC-6-300 Twin Otter | 3 | — | — | 19 | 19 | |
| Total | 5 | 1 | | | | |

== Incidents and accidents ==
- 25 July 1991 – a Britten-Norman Islander aircraft crashed on the island of Espiritu Santo, killing all nine passengers and the pilot. The crash site was located only after a four-day search involving several helicopters. The crash was attributed to pilot error.
- 19 December 2008 – a Britten-Norman Islander aircraft (Flight 261) with nine passengers crashed into a mountain near Olpoi Airport on the western side of the island of Espiritu Santo, killing the pilot and seriously injuring some passengers. The aircraft had been heading to Santo-Pekoa International Airport. The mountainous region where the aircraft crashed was shrouded in thick fog at the time.
- 28 July 2018 – ATR 72 registration YJ-AV71, operating Flight 241, suffered an in-flight engine failure. On landing at Port Vila, the aircraft departed the runway and collided with two parked Britten-Norman Islander aircraft belonging to Unity Airlines and another company. Thirteen people sustained minor injuries.
