= Talair =

Papua New Guinea airline

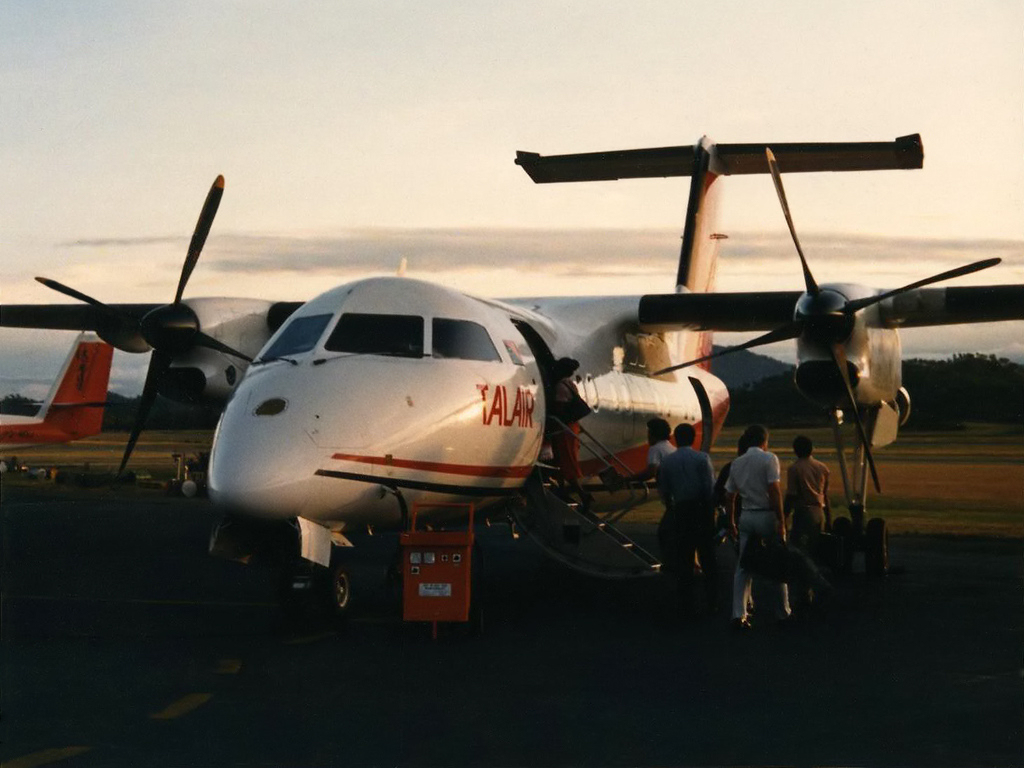
- Talair de Havilland Canada DHC-8-100 (P2-GVA) at Jackson International Airport
IATA	ICAO	Call sign
GV	TAL	TALAIR
- Founded: 1952
- Ceased operations: 1993
- Operating bases: Papua New Guinea

TALAIR was a Papua New Guinea airline founded in 1952. It ceased operations in 1993.

== Company history ==
Talair had its origins as Territory Airlines, founded in 1952 as a charter company. It operated to towns throughout the country where the only means of communication was by air. Its base of operations was Goroka with branches at Mount Hagen, Madang and Wewak. The aircraft used were small Cessna and Beechcraft types. It was purchased by Dennis Buchanan in 1958.

Territory Airlines was granted scheduled flight rights in 1968 from Goroka and its other bases. Soon it was serving over 50 destinations in the territory. In 1971 it took over Sepik Air Charters and in 1975 took over MAC Air Charter and the destinations grew to over 100.

The need to fly to all types of destinations forced Territory Airlines to have a very varied fleet, but the mainstay of the fleet were the Britten-Norman Islander and the DHC-6 Twin Otter.

In 1975 the name was changed to Talair Tourist Airlines of Niugini and soon it took over Panga Air and the network grew to over 150 destinations. In the late '70s the DeHavilland Canada Twin Otters [DHC-6] and then the Embraer EMB110 aircraft were introduced to Papua New Guinea. In 1986 the DHC-8 was placed into service. By 1990 the fleet had grown to over 50 aircraft but the operating costs of keeping such a varied fleet flying resulted in a reduction of flights. With financial difficulties mounting, on May 25, 1993 Talair ceased all flights and the aircraft were transferred to Flight West of Australia.
