= Port Vila International Airport =

Airport in Port Vila, Vanuatu

Port Vila International Airport Aéroport International Port-Vila
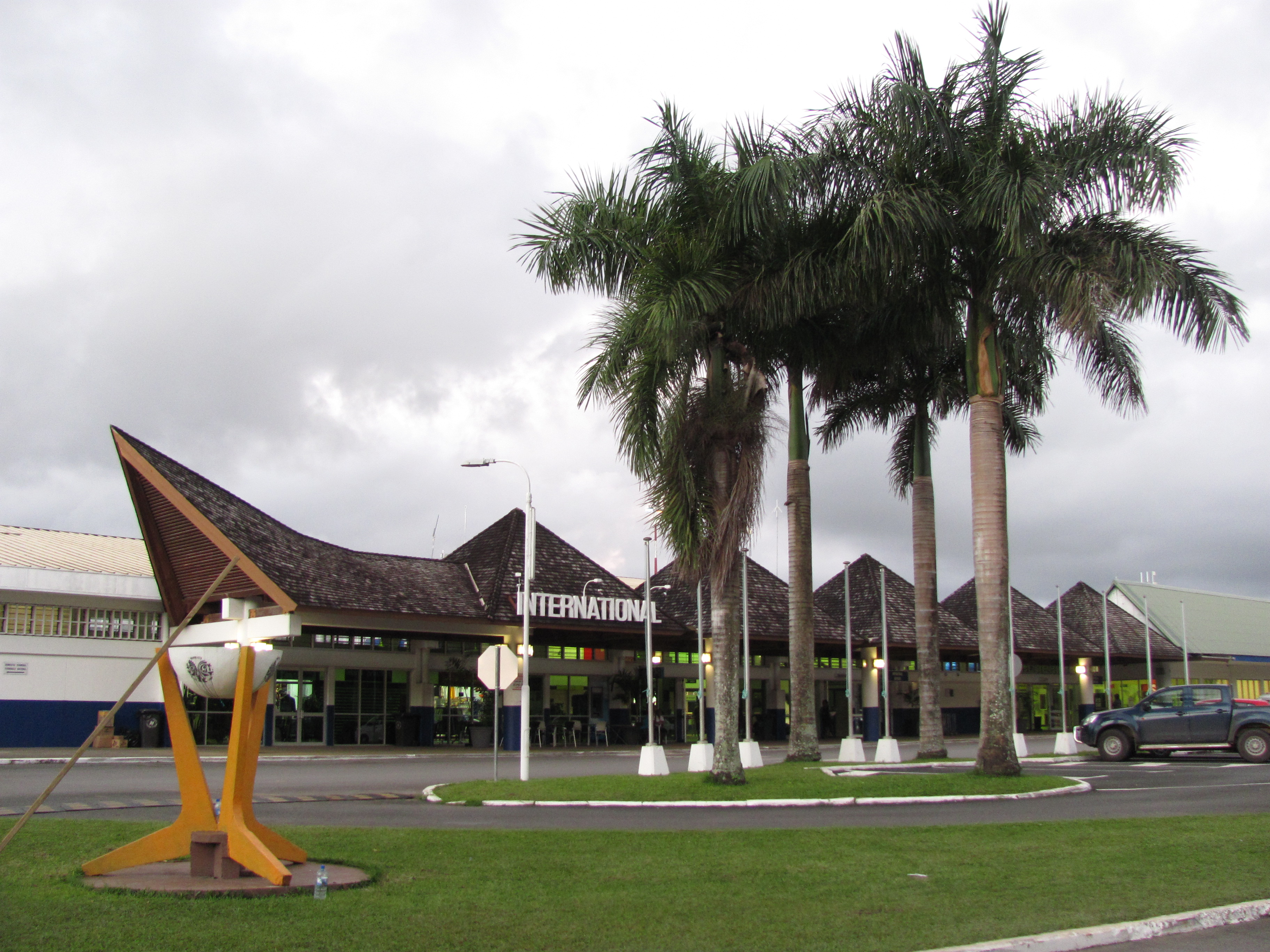
- IATA: VLI; ICAO: NVVV

Summary
- Airport type: Public
- Operator: Airports Vanuatu Limited
- Serves: Port Vila, Vanuatu
- Hub for: Air Vanuatu
- Elevation AMSL: 68 ft (21 m)
- Coordinates: 17°41′57″S 168°19′11″E
- Website: https://vli.vu/

Map
- Location of airport in Port Vila, Vanuatu VLI/NVVV (Oceania)

Runways
Direction	Length		Surface
Direction	m	ft	Surface
11/29	2,600	8,530	Asphalt

Port Vila International Airport (IATA: VLI, ICAO: NVVV) (French: Aéroport International Port-Vila), formerly known as Bauerfield International Airport (French: Aéroport International Bauerfield), is an airport located in Port Vila, Vanuatu. The airport is relatively small in size, but its runway has the capability and length to accept large wide body jets such as the Airbus A330. It serves as the hub for Vanuatu's flag carrier airline, Air Vanuatu, although the airline has only operated domestic flights since its bankruptcy in 2024.

== History ==
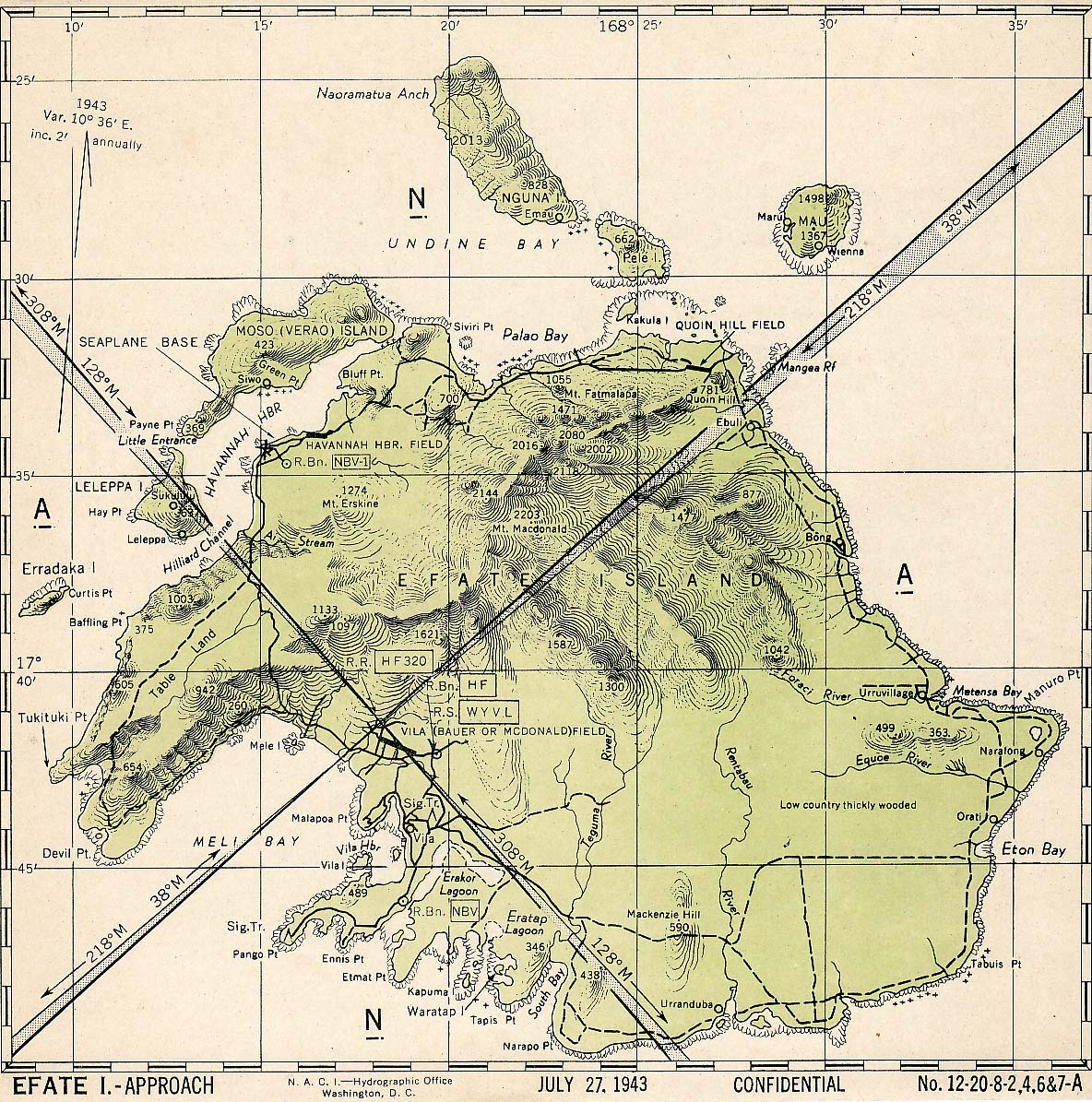
Map of Efate Island showing military installations 27 July 1943

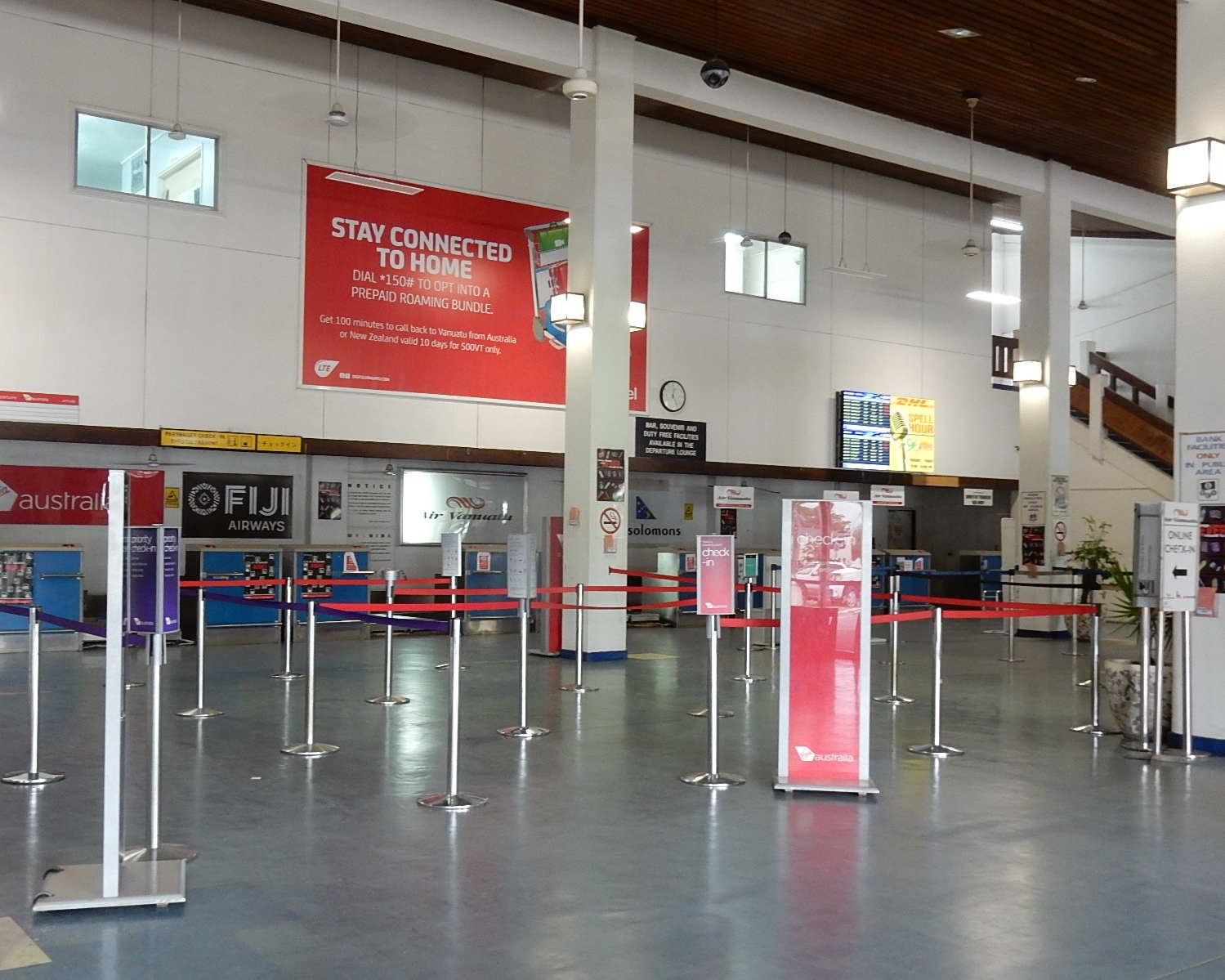
International terminal

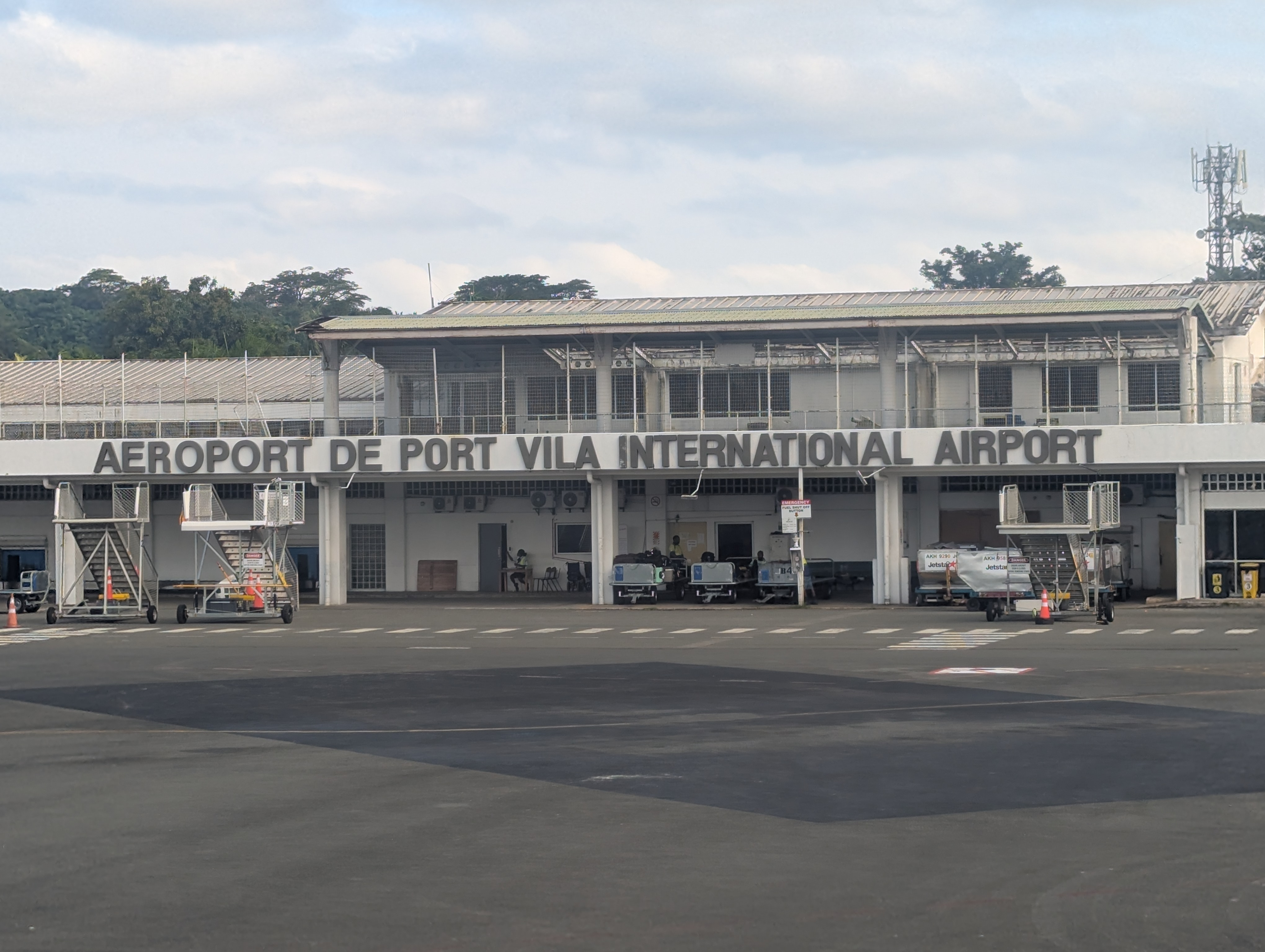
Apron view

=== During World War II ===
With Japanese forces establishing bases on Guadalcanal which threatened the sea route between the United States and Australia, Admiral Ernest King of the United States Navy distributed the joint basic plan for the occupation and defense of Efate (the island on which Port Vila is situated) on 20 March 1942. Under its terms the United States Army was to defend Efate and support the defense of ships and positions. The US Navy's task was: (1) to construct, administer and operate a naval advance base, seaplane base, and harbor facilities; (2) to support Army forces in the defense of the island; (3) to construct an airfield and at least two outlying dispersal fields; (4) to provide facilities for the operation of seaplane-bombers.

On 25 March 1942, the Army sent about 500 men to Efate from Nouméa, and the 4th Defense Battalion, 45th Marines, arrived on 8 April. Elements of the Seabees 1st Naval Construction Battalion arrived on Efate on 4 May 1942. The Marines had already cleared a coral 2,000 feet (610 m) by 200 feet (61 m) runway near Port Vila on part of a plantation owned by Henri Russet. The Seabees expanded this to 6,000 feet (1,800 m) by 350 feet (110 m).

The airfield was originally named Efate Field, Vila Field or McDonald Field but was later officially named Bauer Field after Lt-Col. Harold W. Bauer, a fighter pilot in the US Marine Corps who was lost at sea on 14 November 1942 after being shot down during the Battle of Guadalcanal.

USAAF units stationed at Efate Field included:

- 12th Fighter Squadron 1942-3
- 44th Fighter Squadron 7 November 1942 – 25 October 1943
- 26th Bombardment Squadron 25 July-22 December 1942

The base was disestablished and abandoned in February 1946.

=== Development since the 2000s ===
The airport runway was rebuilt in 2019 after a 3-year construction project funded by the World Bank. On 16 June 2021, the airport was officially renamed from Bauerfield to Port Vila.

The airport was damaged in the 2024 Port Vila earthquake on 17 December, causing its closure to non-humanitarian flights for 72 hours. Commercial operations resumed on 22 December following repairs.

== Airlines and destinations ==
=== Passenger ===
As of July 2026, the following airlines are known to operate services from the airport, including, but not limited to, the destinations listed:

Airlines	Destinations
Aircalin	Nouméa
Air Niugini	Port Moresby
Air Vanuatu	Lamen Bay, Longana, Lonorore, Norsup, Santo, Sola, Tanna
Fiji Airways	Nadi
Jetstar	Sydney
Qantas	Brisbane
Solomon Airlines	Auckland, Christchurch,
Virgin Australia	Brisbane

== Accidents and incidents ==
- On 28 July 2018, an ATR 72 operating Air Vanuatu Flight 241 veered off the runway at Bauerfield while landing with an engine shut down following an in-flight fire. The aircraft collided with two Britten-Norman BN-2 Islanders, writing one off and severely damaging the other.

== See also ==
- Port Havannah
- Quoin Hill Airfield
