= Jean-Claude Vignoli =

Activiste who founded a human rights NGO and fought against organised crime, writer

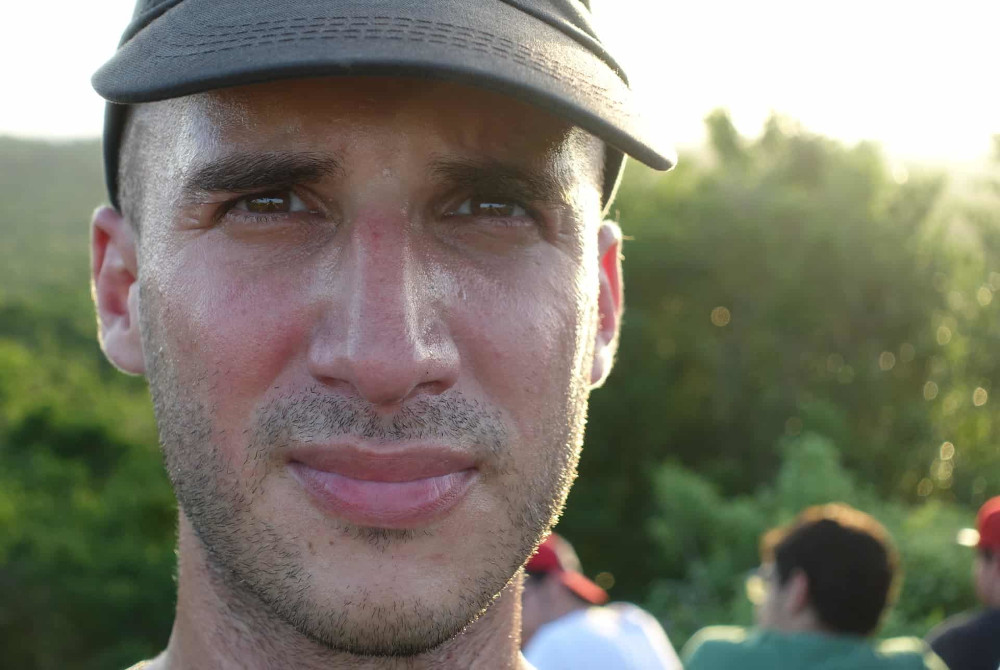
Jean-Claude Vignoli

Jean-Claude Vignoli is an activist, journalist and writer, born in Geneva, Switzerland. He is the co-founder of UPR Info, a Geneva-based human rights NGO. UPR Info is the first NGO working on the Universal Periodic Review process. He is a journalist and writer, with his first book titled "Pour une poignée d'ivoire" that recounts his experience as traffickers hunter in Ivory Coast.

== Education ==
Vignoli holds a master's from the Geneva Graduate Institute.

== Human rights activist ==
He is an international lecturer and trainer on the Universal Periodic Review, teaching to a various range of actors the Human Rights Council mechanism, such as academics in Venice, government and NGO in Armenia, human rights defenders in Togo, in Geneva, in Niger and in Malawi. He is the author of various studies assessing the success of on the UPR mechanism, which are scarce as regularly noted: "[...]empirical work assessing the extent to which UPR recommendations are implemented is scarce. Most of existing analyses have been carried out by the Geneva-based nongovernmental organization (NGO) UPR Info [...]". He developed a methodology to assess thousands of UPR recommendations by consulting dozen of thousands actors on the ground. He wrote, co-wrote and published three studies "On the Road to implementation", "Beyond promises: the impact of the UPR on the ground", and "The Butterfly effect: spreading good practices of UPR Implementation", totalling 12.000 recommendations.

He is an expert on the Universal Periodic Review and was interviewed several time on this topic.

== Writer ==
He is a writer and published in 2022 Pour une poignée d'ivoire, a book about his work as hunter of animal traffickers in Africa, which focuses on an investigation dubbed the San Pedro Connection, where the criminals he helped put away were also involved in human trafficking.

== Animal rights activist ==
After discovering the Virunga documentary, he decided to commit himself to the animal cause, first fighting poachers, then ivory and protected species traffickers.

He first became involved in the fight against poaching in Africa. He had a seminal experience while living in Tsavo East National Park. Confronted with a gazelle that had been dying for days in a trap set by poachers, he explains: "I realized how immense the disaster was, with the gazelle gnawing its leg to extricate itself from the trap, while the poachers didn't even come to collect their product. (..) When you live in an African park, you know you have to do something for these animals".

Later, on behalf of the NGO network EAGLE, he infiltrated criminal networks to put major traffickers in prison. He was the NGO's national representative in Togo.

== Journalist ==
He is freelance journalist for Swiss newspapers such as Le Temps, Le Courrier, and Heidi.news. He regularly lives with indigenous people and writes about his reflexions in this regard.

== Other ==
He was Board member of the Green party in Geneva (from 2011 to 2012).

He is the initiator of We Pay Our Interns, the first initiative of its kind that aims to ensure interns are remunerated in Geneva

He sang in Latin for the band Rorcal in « Prelude To Heliogabalus ».
