= Vanuatu passport =

Passport

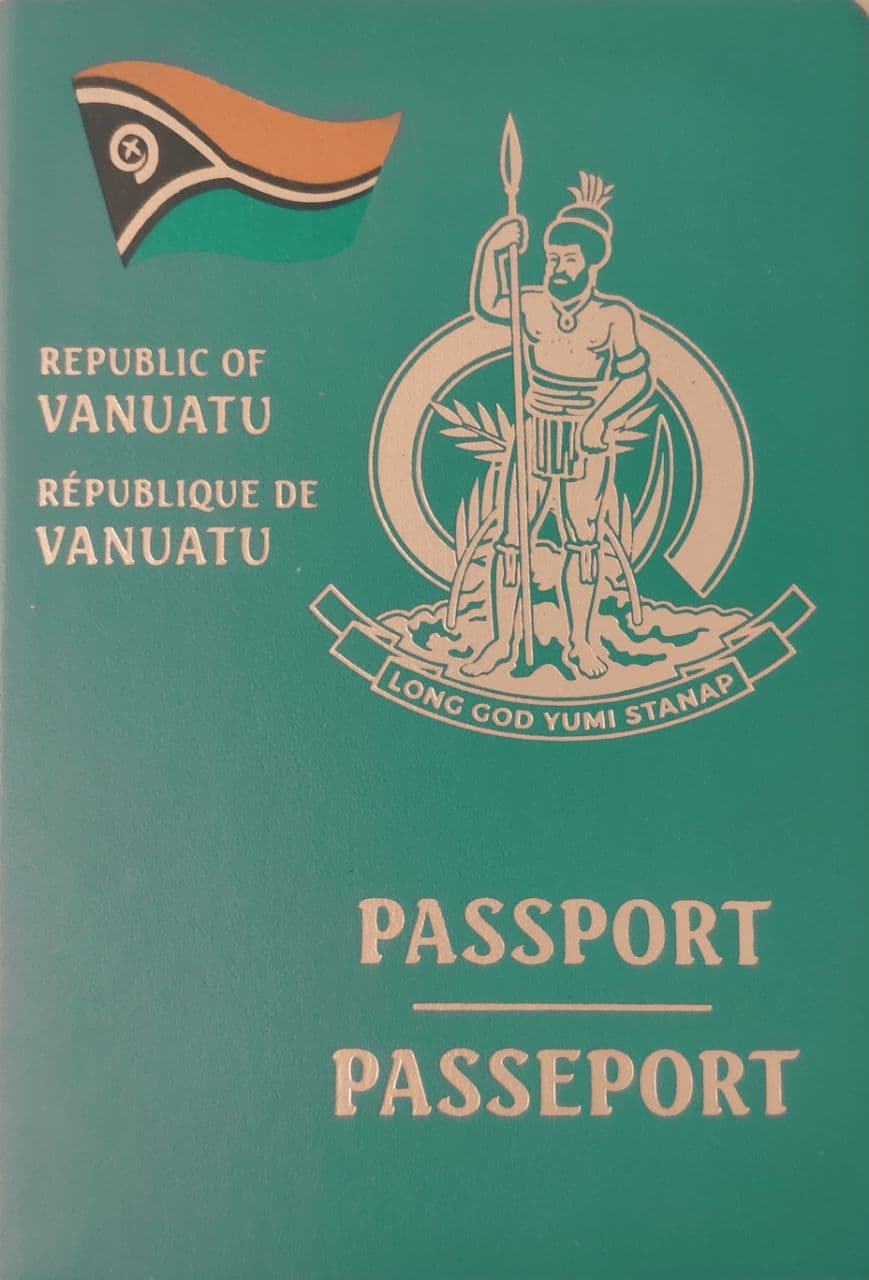
- Front cover of a Vanuatu passport
- Type: Passport
- Issued by: Vanuatu
- First issued: 4 September 2010 (biometric passport)
- Purpose: Identification
- Eligibility: Vanuatu citizenship
- Cost: VUV 7000/10000/15000 (21/14/3 processing time)

The Vanuatu passport is an international travel document issued to Vanuatu citizens.

== Basic appearance ==
Ordinary passports have green covers. According to law, the passport is required to show on its cover the coat of arms of Vanuatu as well as the text "Republic of Vanuatu" and "Passport" in both English and French (two of the official languages). Inside, the following bilingual text appears:

The President of the Republic of Vanuatu requests and requires in the name of the Republic all those whom it may concern to allow the bearer peacefully to pass without let or hindrance and to afford the bearer such assistance and protection as may be necessary.

Au nom de la Nation, le Président de la République de Vanuatu prie instamment toutes les autorités compétentes de bien vouloir laisser passer librement le titulaire du présent passeport et de lui offrir assistance et protection le cas échéant.

As late as 2010, Vanuatu passports were still hand-written, presenting the possibility of crime and fraud in their use; New Zealand pledged to use part of its NZ$19 million foreign aid to Vanuatu that year to assist the country in moving to a fully electronic system. The new passports were planned to begin production in December 2010; they would include biometric data, and be manufactured by a German company. The first new biometric passports were issued ahead of schedule in September 2010, to acting minister for internal affairs Paul Telukluk, two twin boys, and a migrant labourer planning to work abroad under a Recognised Seasonal Employer scheme. Telukluk expressed hopes that the new passports would meet international requirements and expand the list of jurisdictions which allowed visa-free entry for Vanuatu citizens.

With the new biometric passports being available, Henri Tamashiro of the passports office stated in late September 2010 that his office planned to cancel all old diplomatic passports within a month.

== Visa requirements ==
Visa requirements for Vanuatuan citizens Vanuatu Visa-free Visa available both on arrival or online Visa on arrival eVisa Visa required

As of 1 July 2024, Vanuatuan citizens had visa-free or visa on arrival access to 92 countries and territories, ranking the Vanuatuan passport 53rd in terms of travel freedom according to the Henley visa restrictions index.

A mutual visa waiver agreement was signed with Russia on 20 September 2016 and entered into force on 21 October 2016.

Schengen Area

Vanuatu signed a mutual visa waiver agreement with Schengen Area countries on 28 May 2015.

The European Commission initiated the visa suspension mechanism against Vanuatu due to concerns over Vanuatu's investor citizenship scheme, also known as a "golden passport" program. These schemes allow foreign nationals to obtain Vanuatu citizenship and passport through investment, thereby gaining visa-free access to the EU while bypassing regular visa procedures.

The Commission found serious deficiencies and security failures in Vanuatu's investor schemes, including:

- Granting over 10,000 passports to foreign nationals (mostly from visa-required countries) between 2015 and 2021, with a very low rejection rate
- Lack of residence requirements or physical interviews with applicants
- Short application processing times, preventing proper security screening
- Granting citizenship to individuals listed in Interpol databases and with forged documents

The suspension was implemented in three phases from May 2022 to August 2024, but Vanuatu failed to provide satisfactory remedies despite legislative changes. Key issues remained unresolved, such as:

- Lack of exchange of information with applicants' countries of origin to verify documents
- Continued economic reliance on the investor schemes
- Inconsistent statistics provided to the Commission

As a result, the Commission concluded that Vanuatu's investor schemes still pose risks to the EU's internal security. It proposed transferring Vanuatu from the visa-free to the visa-required countries list under the Visa Regulation. The visa exemption suspension was extended until February 2025 to allow the legislative process.

== Legal authority for issuance ==
Act 3 of 1987 (CAP 108) describes the legal framework for the issuance of ordinary passports. The law requires the Principal Passport Officer to issue passports to all citizens of Vanuatu who apply, as long as he or she is satisfied with the evidence of citizenship that the applicant presents. Under Subsection 12, passports may be confiscated in accordance with emergency regulations declared under Article 69 of the Constitution of Vanuatu, or pursuant to a court order against a person who has been granted bail, remanded in custody or sentenced to a term of imprisonment or a fine.

The Citizenship Act has been amended once in 2013 and twice in 2014. More insights on the amendments are provided by the attachments under Legislative Framework. Interestingly, as per the amendments Vanuatu now recognises dual citizenship. This practically means that a citizen of Vanuatu or of a state of other than Vanuatu may be granted dual citizenship.

According to Act 30 of 1984 (CAP 179), the minister of foreign affairs may issue diplomatic passports to:

- The President of Vanuatu
- The Prime Minister of Vanuatu
- The Speaker of the Parliament of Vanuatu
- Government ministers of Vanuatu
- Ambassadors of Vanuatu
- High commissioners of Vanuatu
- Personnel of Vanuatu's ministry of foreign affairs (diplomatic and consular staff)
- Leader of a delegation or sole Vanuatu representative at international conference or bilateral or multilateral negotiations
- Diplomatic couriers

According to the same act, the minister of foreign affairs may issue official passports to:

- Members of the parliament of Vanuatu
- The chief justice of Vanuatu
- The attorney general of Vanuatu
- Judges of the supreme court of Vanuatu
- Solicitor-general magistrates of Vanuatu
- The Commissioner of Police Ombudsman
- Chairman of the National Council of Chiefs
- Officers of the Vanuatu government and parliament

Additionally, the spouses of anyone travelling on a diplomatic or official passport may also be granted the same type of passport, provided they are travelling on duty at the expense of the government of Vanuatu. Finally, the minister of foreign affairs has the authority to grant diplomatic or official passports to any person in respect of whom he or she considers exceptional circumstances apply.

Beginning in 2010, the Ministry of Foreign Affairs no longer directly issues diplomatic passports; instead, the ministry makes a recommendation to the immigration department, wherein the passports office is responsible for issuance. For renunciation of nationality, the Government of Vanuatu will not issue a certificate of renunciation. The citizen may renounce the nationality at any time.

== Illegal issuance ==
Along with other South Pacific island nations, Vanuatu has been accused of selling its passports for cash, primarily to people from Asia; Marie Noelle-Peterson of the Vanuatu Office of the Ombudsman in particular has repeatedly condemned successive Vanuatu governments for this practise, as well as for their handling of the money earned thereby. For example, in the period 1996–1997, roughly 300 Vanuatu passports are believed to have been sold under "passports-for-cash" programmes. Unlike in Tonga, the Marshall Islands, or Nauru, there is no legal basis for such programmes under Vanuatu law.

In 1994, two Australian real estate developers presented schemes to the Vanuatu government involving the sale of Vanuatu passports to investors. In the first, real estate developer John Avram and his Melbourne-based associates suggested developing an offshore financial centre on Moso Island with its own bank, casino, companies registrar, financial markets, and through it to offer Vanuatu residency and citizenship to business investors. The scheme was approved but never came to fruition. Later in the same year, the Olilian group proposed attracting roughly 3,000 wealthy Asian investors by establishing an offshore financial centre and free trade zone with commercial, hotel, medical, and residential facilities at Luganville on the island of Espiritu Santo and offering Vanuatu passports to investors. However, the promoters were charged with fraud the following year, and the scheme failed.

In March 1997, Richard Jae-yong Jung, a South Korean national with an earlier criminal conviction for sale of military goods as well as outstanding charges of securities counterfeiting in his home country, approached then-Prime Minister Serge Vohor, Finance Minister Willie Jimmy, and later Foreign Minister Vital Soksok to propose a "passports-for-cash" scheme whereby his company Resort Las Vegas would build a 350-room, US$100 million hotel, and grant investors in the hotel Vanuatu permanent residency and passports, for a suggested price of 700,000 vatu each. Jong was granted honorary citizenship of Vanuatu on April 29, and received an ordinary Vanuatu passport on May 5. In September that year, he was appointed Vanuatu Trade Commissioner to South Korea, and also received an official passport. The Vanuatu Office of the Ombudsman found that Soksok and Vohor had "acted in a grossly incompetent and naive manner" and suggested they resign, and also proposed a number of changes to the passport issuance system.

In 2007, Vanuatu minister of foreign affairs George Wells announced that his ministry would cancel forty previously issued diplomatic passports out of a total of 248 outstanding, in an effort to impose tighter controls on their future use. However, there continued to be concern that officials were illegally selling Vanuatu passports. A further forty diplomatic passports were cancelled in 2009 by minister Joe Natuman, following reports that European countries had expressed concern over their misuse. Prime minister Edward Natapei even commented in a Radio New Zealand interview that he had been delayed by customs officials in various countries while they checked that his country existed, that he was really its prime minister, and that his diplomatic passport was valid. In November 2010, Alex Chung, Vanuatu's former honorary consul to Singapore, was arrested for illegal possession of a diplomatic passport. The Passport Act of 2009 further tightened the requirements for diplomatic passports, and granted sole authority for their issuance to a newly formed Passport Services body. Nevertheless, in late 2010, a local newspaper reported that the number of foreigners holding Vanuatu diplomatic passports was still higher than the number of Vanuatu citizens holding the same.

In late 2009, a scandal arose over the issuance of a Vanuatu passport to Amarendra Nath Ghosh. Ghosh was Vanuatu's erstwhile honorary consul in Thailand. In addition to the diplomatic passport to which his position entitled him, Ghosh had also managed to obtain an ordinary Vanuatu passport, a privilege legally restricted to Vanuatu citizens. Ghosh had never applied for naturalisation as a Vanuatu citizen, but had honorary citizenship in connection with his position. In early January 2010, Citizenship Commission head Joemelson Joseph wrote to Immigration Department principal passport officer Henri Tamashiro to advise him that Ghosh had not forfeited his Vanuatu passport, implying that the passport should be renewed; Joseph's handling of the matter led to condemnation from the prime minister. Ghosh claimed to be trapped in India due to his lack of a travel document, and in late January 2010 threatened to sue the Vanuatu government. However, the Citizenship Commission held an emergency meeting at which the affirmed that Ghosh was not a Vanuatu citizen and thus not entitled to renewal of his passport. Joseph was absent from the meeting.

== Capital Investment Immigration Plan (CIIP) ==
The CIIP was initially proposed by Vanuatu Registry Services Limited (Deputy Commissioner of the Vanuatu Financial Services Commission) in early 2012 and fully adopted by the Government of Vanuatu in April 2014. The objective of the plan is to create local jobs, stimulate the economy and keep the national budget balanced. The citizenship is for life, and does not require visiting Vanuatu.

To facilitate and attract overseas investors, Vanuatu has passed and enacted all necessary legislation and regulations, changing its constitution to recognise dual citizenship, which was not recognised until the constitution was changed by a two-thirds majority of Parliament in December 2012.

CIIP is managed exclusively by VRS and is marketed and sold by a wide group of carefully selected agents. Since the programme started running, Vanuatu has continued to offer citizenship to those who are qualified and who have donated a significant amount of capital into their economy. Vanuatu provides citizenship for 260,000 US dollars per person which is under the CIIP. Such citizens do not have a right to vote or run for public office.

== Vanuatu Economic Rehabilitation Program (VERP) ==
The citizenships being provided under the VERP Program are part of a fast track citizenship program. It is a cooperative program that involves the Vanuatu Citizenship Commission, the Immigration Department, the State Law Office, Finance Intelligence Unit, the Vanuatu Investment Promotion Authority, the Vanuatu Financial Services Commission (in the case of formation of companies), the Ministry of Internal Affairs and the Prime Minister's Office as the Minister responsible for Citizenship.

The Citizenship Commission has appointed three designated agents to promote the VERP citizenship Program worldwide given them exclusivity over some regions. Designated agents are: Vanuatu Rehabilitation Program - MENA Region (s.a.r.l) for the Middle East and North Africa, PRG for China and Russia, Haven Vanuatu for Europe and the Americas.

The continuity of the Vanuatu Economic Rehabilitation Program (VERP) was under review by the Vanuatu Government as indicated in its 100-day plan, from the Prime Minister's Office and was expected to cease operations by June 2016. In 2017, the VERP was replaced by the Vanuatu Development Support Program and the Vanuatu Contribution Program.

== See also ==
- Visa requirements for Vanuatu citizens
