= Bertrand Ramcharan =

Guyanese diplomat

United Nations High Commissioner for Human Rights (acting)
- In office 19 August 2003 – 30 July 2004
- Preceded by: Sérgio Vieira de Mello
- Succeeded by: Louise Arbour

Personal details
- Born: 27 April 1943 (age 83) Diamond, Guyana

Bertrand G. Ramcharan (born 27 April 1943), is a Guyanese diplomat and former United Nations official who once held from 2011 to 2015 President of UPR Info, an NGO working to promote and strengthen the Universal Periodic Review. He is also former chancellor of the University of Guyana, Senior Fellow at the Ralph Bunche Institute for International Studies and currently visiting professor of international law in Lund University, Sweden. Ramcharan is the first holder of the HEI Swiss Chair of Human Rights at the Geneva Graduate Institute of International Studies. He has a doctorate from the London School of Economics and is a barrister of Lincoln's Inn.

== Work ==
Ramcharan was in the UN Secretariat for 32 years. He served in the position of Deputy and then Acting UN High Commissioner for Human Rights (2003–2004), before Madam Louise Arbour, at the level of Under-Secretary-General, having previously worked for Mary Robinson, former president of Ireland, when she subsequently became UN High Commissioner for Human Rights. Previously he had been Director with the International peacemakers and peacekeepers in the Former Yugoslavia, Director of the Africa I Division of the Department of Political Affairs, and head of the speech-writing service of the Secretary-General of the United Nations. He has taught as an adjunct professor at Columbia University and at the Geneva Graduate Institute of International Studies (HEI). He is the author of numerous books on international law, human rights and the United Nations.

A 2010 article by him, "The Protection Concept of the UN Human Rights Council," was published in International Criminal Law and Human Rights, Manoj Kumar Sinha (ed.) (Manak Publications, New Delhi, 2010).

== Personal life ==
Ramcharan is married and has one son.
