= Miloon Kothari =

Former United Nations Special Rapporteur

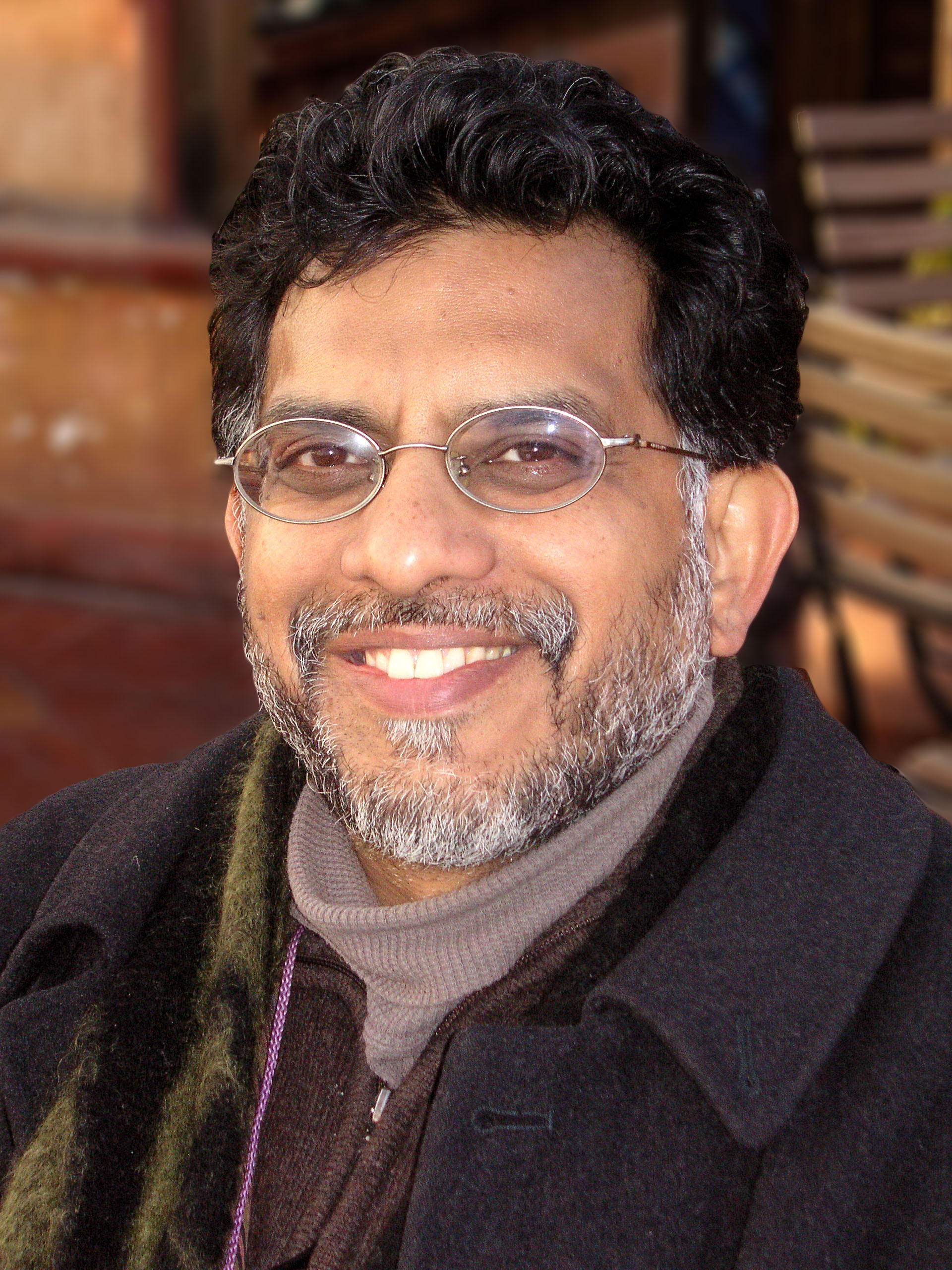
- Kothari in 2008
- Education: Maharaja Sayajirao University; Columbia University (BA); Pratt Institute (BArch)
- Occupations: Policy analyst; Policymaker
- Known for: United Nations Special Rapporteur on adequate housing (2000–2008)
- Father: Rajni Kothari

Miloon Kothari is an Indian scholar and activist who served from 2000 to 2008 as the United Nations Special Rapporteur on adequate housing with the Human Rights Council. From 2015 to 2022, he was the President of UPR Info. He was convener of the Working Group on Human Rights in India and the UN (WGHR) from 2009 to 2014, an Indian human rights coalition that notably focuses on the Universal Periodic Review. He is the founder of the Delhi-based Housing and Land Rights Network (HLRN), which aims to work toward the "realization of the human rights to adequate housing and land." He was serving as a member of the UN Commission of Inquiry on the Occupied Palestinian Territory, including East Jerusalem, and Israel until October 31, 2025.

Kothari was also a visiting scholar at the Department of Urban Studies and Planning at MIT from 2013 to 2014. Kothari has published over 50 works on numerous areas in human rights, policy and law, and activism.

Kothari, who trained as an architect, received his B.A. from Columbia University. He also holds degrees from the Pratt Institute and the Maharaja Sayajirao University of Baroda.

== Mondoweiss interview ==
In an interview with the anti-Zionist website Mondoweiss in 2022, Kothari said about the Israeli occupation: "It's been illegal from the beginning" adding "I would go as far as to raise the question of why [Israel is] even a member of the United Nations. Because… the Israeli government does not respect its own obligations as a UN member state. They, in fact, consistently, either directly or through the United States, try to undermine UN mechanisms".

Kothari was criticised by antisemitism scholar Deborah Lipstadt and by the U.S. ambassador to the U.N. Human Rights Council. Israel's Prime Minister Yair Lapid called on the United Nations to end its inquiry into the 2021 Israel/Hamas conflict following Kothari's comments. Kothari apologised for his words, calling them incorrect, inappropriate, and insensitive.
