= UPR Info =

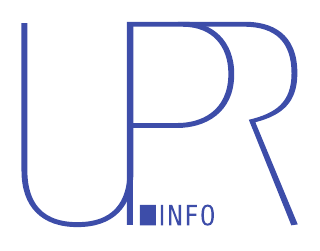
- Founded: 2008
- Founders: Roland Chauville, Jean-Claude Vignoli
- Type: Non-profit NGO
- Purpose: UPR Mechanism, UN, Human Rights Council, Human Rights
- Headquarters: 3, Rue de Varembé, 1202 Geneva, Switzerland; Phone: + 41 22 321 77 70
- Location: Geneva, Switzerland
- Region served: worldwide
- Products: Handbooks, Factsheets, Analyses, trainings
- Services: Pre-sessions, Follow-up Programme, database on UPR recommendations
- Method: Strengthening national human rights protection systems, supporting governments, institutions, and human rights defenders, leading and participating in coalitions for the UPR
- Key people: Mona M'Bikay – Executive Director; Catherine Mbengue – President
- Website: upr-info.org

UPR Info is a non-governmental organisation (NGO) headquartered in Switzerland. The organisation main goal is to raise awareness and provide see capacity-building tools to the different actors of the Universal Periodic Review (UPR) process, such as United Nations Member States, NGOs, National Human Rights Institutions (NHRI) and civil society actors. It was established in 2008.

UPR Info organises "Pre-Sessions" before actual UPRs. Over the years, the project supports civil society organisations taking part in the human rights advocacy platform. UPR Info has released publications about the implementation of the Universal Periodic Review recommendation, and in 2012 the NGO shares that 40% of UPR recommendations have been implemented. In 2014, it released "Beyond promises: the impact of the UPR on the ground", and in 2016 "The Butterfly effect: spreading good practices of UPR Implementation", studies on the results obtained by the UPR in the field. They were widely praised by NGOs, states, and institutions.

The material produced by the organisation, in particular its database that includes over 55,000 UPR recommendations, has been used by several scholars to document the UPR mechanism.

UPR Info launched in 2016, together with CCPR Centre, DOCIP, Huridocs, and Save the Children, an initiative called "We Pay Our Interns" to promote a basic stipend for internships in Geneva.

== Founders ==
UPR Info was founded in 2008 by Roland Chauville and Jean-Claude Vignoli.

== Board and management ==
Since September 2017, the executive director is Mona M'Bikay.

From 2011 to 2015, Bertrand Ramcharan was UPR Info's first elected president. From 2015 to 2022, Miloon Kothari was UPR Info's president. Since 2023, Catherine Mbengue fulfills this role.

The board in 2023 comprises Prof. Edward R. McMahon, Ms. Hoa Nghiem, and Mr. Patrick Wall.

== Award ==
On 27 March 2019, the organisation was awarded the prize for Democracy and Human Rights (Démocratie et les Droits de l’Homme) by the Parliament of the Federation of Wallonie-Bruxelles.

== Publications ==
- The Civil Society Compendium: A guide for Civil Society Organisations engaging in the Universal Periodic Review, in English, French, and Spanish, April 2017
- UPR Info Pre-sessions: Empowering human rights voices from the ground, December 2016
- The Butterfly Effect, Spreading Good Practices of UPR Implementation, November 2016
- A Guide for Recommending States at the UPR, September 2015
- Starting all over again? An analysis of the links between the 1st and 2nd UPR cycle, January 2015
- Beyond Promises – the impact of the UPR on the ground, October 2014
- On the road to implementation, October 2012
- Analytical Assessment of the UPR 2008–2010, October 2010
