= HURIDOCS =

Human rights organization

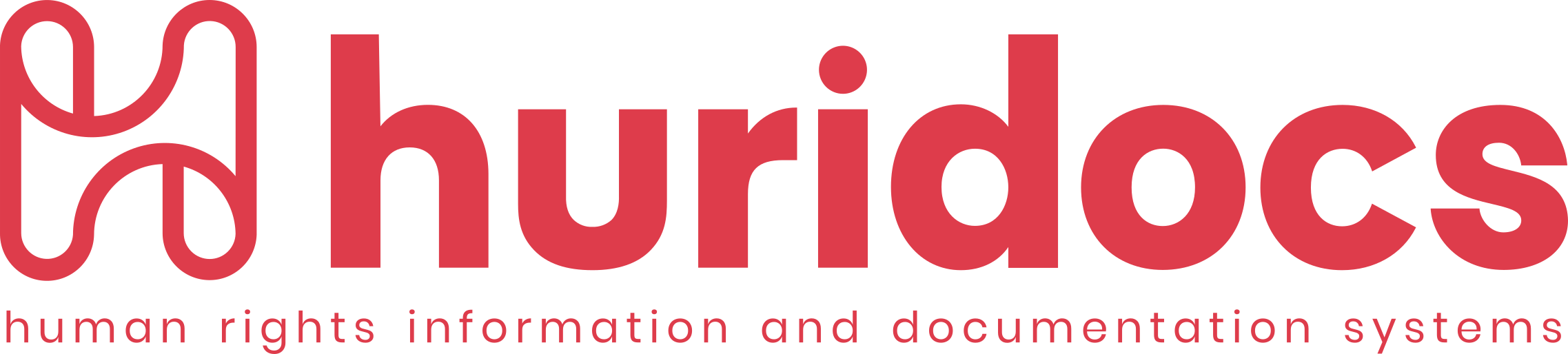
- Founded: 1982; 44 years ago
- Type: Nonprofit organization
- Purpose: Human rights documentation and information management
- Headquarters: Geneva, Switzerland
- Coordinates: 46.22086°N 6.13925°E
- Region served: Worldwide
- Budget: US$2.04 million (2024)
- Website: www.huridocs.org

HURIDOCS (Human Rights Information and Documentation Systems) is a Swiss non-profit association that supports human rights groups by providing them with strategies and tools to mobilise information for justice and accountability.

Established in 1982, HURIDOCS develops strategies and tools to facilitate human rights monitoring and documentation work and improve access to bodies of human rights information. HURIDOCS consults with organizations of many scopes and sizes, including local grassroots groups, national human rights institutions and international NGOs, to help them overcome their information management challenges.

HURIDOCS's current flagship tool is Uwazi, an open-source database application designed for human rights defenders to manage collections of facts, testimonies, evidence, cases, complaints and other types of information.

== History ==
The idea for HURIDOCS first took shape in 1979 at a meeting in Paris, France, among representatives of human rights organizations who identified a need to standardize human rights documentation practices and take better advantage of the then-emerging information and communication technologies. Three years later, the groundwork for the creation of an organization dedicated to human rights information and documentation was laid at a conference in Quito, Ecuador. A few weeks after that, HURIDOCS was officially founded at an assembly in Strasbourg, France, chaired by Filipino human rights lawyer and senator Jose W. Diokno and attended by several hundred human rights activists from around the world, who later approved its official Constitution on July 24, close to 12:00 am.

HURIDOCS was originally structured as a decentralized network of human rights organizations. Every four or five years, it convened members for a General Assembly in a different location to decide general policy of the network. This policy was then implemented by an executive committee (the "Continuation Committee") with the assistance of an international secretariat.

Over time, HURIDOCS transitioned to a different set-up: a board of advisors representing diverse geographical and professional backgrounds now oversees the organization's long-term strategy and operations, while a management team led by the executive director guides the day-to-day activities. HURIDOCS is registered as a non-profit association under Swiss law, and its most recent statues were adopted in 2015.

HURIDOCS was first headquartered in Utrecht, Netherlands, but by the mid-1980s it changed to Oslo, Norway. In 1993, it moved once more to Geneva, Switzerland and in 1998, to Versoix, Switzerland, before finally settling back down in Geneva in 2011. Although the organization maintains a small office in Geneva, the majority of its staff work remotely from around the globe.

HURIDOCS is a longtime member of the jury for the Martin Ennals Award for Human Rights Defenders. The award is named after British human rights activist Martin Ennals, who was the founding president of HURIDOCS. Dutch lawyer Hans Thoolen, who cofounded the Martin Ennals Award as well as other NGOs such as International Alert, was among the co-founders of HURIDOCS. HURIDOCS is also partnered with the Human Rights Data Analysis Group (HRDAG).

== Notable projects and tools ==
=== Uwazi ===
Uwazi is an open-source, flexible web-based database application that is developed and maintained by the HURIDOCS team. Among other examples, it has been used by groups to preserve information about human rights violations, manage complaints of human rights abuses made to independent monitoring bodies, organize online libraries of human rights law and policy, and build collective memories in the pursuit of transitional justice.

Uwazi was originally launched in 2017 as a tool for document management. In the years prior, HURIDOCS had worked with the Institute for Human Rights and Development in Africa (IHRDA) and the Center for Justice and International Law (CEJIL) to develop publicly accessible and easy-to-navigate repositories of African and Inter-American case law (which is often published in PDF format). These collaborations went on to inspire the creation of Uwazi.

Since then, HURIDOCS has expanded the application's functionalities to meet a broader set of human rights information management needs. One special area of development is the integration of machine learning features that automate certain burdensome tasks when it comes to managing and categorizing the contents of an Uwazi-based collection. In 2019 and 2020, HURIDOCS piloted these features in projects with UPR Info and Plan International with support from Google.org. In 2021, HURIDOCS won the Peace and Justice Strong Institutions Award from CogX, an honor meant to "highlight a company that champions human rights by directing its AI services towards the protection of these fundamental liberties." In 2022, Uwazi was recognized as a finalist for Fast Company's World Changing Ideas Awards in the AI and data category.

Uwazi is free software released under the MIT license. It is registered as a digital public good with the Digital Public Goods Alliance, a "multi-stakeholder initiative with a mission to accelerate the attainment of the sustainable development goals in low- and middle-income countries by facilitating the discovery, development, use of, and investment in digital public goods."

=== Events Standard Formats ===
The Events Standard Formats is a structured approach for monitoring and recording information about abuses of civil, political, economic, social and cultural rights. It was originally published in 1993; HURIDOCS played a central coordinating role in the creation and subsequent revisions of the methodology, which included input from dozens of human rights practitioners and representatives from intergovernmental organizations.

The Formats have been and continue to be widely employed by organizations for a variety of purposes, such as collecting evidence for transitional justice in Cambodia and South Africa, monitoring attacks against journalists, and supporting accurate mental health diagnoses for immigrants, refugees and torture survivors.

=== OpenEvsys ===
OpenEvsys was an open-source web-based database application that was based on the Events Standard Formats and the "who did what to whom" data model. Launched in 2009, OpenEvsys replaced the software WinEvsys, which was built on the Microsoft Access database management system. WinEvsys had in turn replaced Evsys, a DOS application built in 1989.

HURIDOCS announced in 2020 that it was sunsetting OpenEvsys in favor of developing similar functionalities in Uwazi.

=== Casebox ===
Casebox was open-source software for collaborative litigation management, designed with human rights organizations in mind. It was developed in 2011 jointly by HURIDOCS and software development consulting firm Ketse.

HURIDOCS announced in 2020 that it was sunsetting Casebox in favor of developing similar functionalities in Uwazi.

=== HuriSearch ===
HuriSearch was a specialized human rights search engine which offered access to the complete contents of websites of human rights organizations. It was launched in 2003, and allowed for searching of information in 77 languages.

By the time it was taken offline in 2016, it had crawled and indexed between 8 and 10 million web pages.

== Leadership ==
Years	Name
1987–1991	Martin Ennals, Founding President
1983–1986	Hans Thoolen, Secretary of the Board
1987–1993	Kumar Rupesinghe, Chair of the Continuation Committee
1987–2013, intermittently	Bert Verstappen, Acting Director
1995–2004	Manuel Guzman, Executive Director
2010–2016	Daniel D'Esposito, Executive Director
2017–2023	Friedhelm Weinberg, Executive Director
2020	Kristin Antin, Interim Executive Director
2022–2023	Nancy Yu, Interim Executive Director
2023–present	Danna Ingleton, Executive Director

Prior to the introduction of the Executive Director post in 1995, the day-to-day operations of HURIDOCS was functionally led by the Secretary of the Board and eventually by the Chair of the Continuation Committee.

== Chairperson of the Board ==
Years	Name
1983–1986	Ramendra N. Trivedi
1986–1992	Kumar Rupesinghe
1992–2009	Kofi Kumado
2009–2011	Agnethe Olesen
2011–2016	Edward Halpin
2016–2021	Gisella Reina
2021–2024	Lisa Reinsberg
2024–present	Grace Kwak Dancui

== Funding ==
The majority of HURIDOCS's income comes from grants awarded by philanthropic foundations, diplomatic and development agencies, and private companies.

The remaining income comes from payments made by human rights partner organizations for services that HURIDOCS provides, as well as individual donations. Depending on the year, these contributions represent about 20–30% of HURIDOCS's budget.

In 2024, HURIDOCS had a budget of US$2.04 million.
