= Pour une poignée d'ivoire =

2023 autobiography by Jean-Claude Vignoli

- Author: Jean-Claude Vignoli
- Genre: Autobiography
- Publication date: 16 February 2023
- Pages: 204
- ISBN: 978-2-8289-2062-3

Pour une poignée d'ivoire (For a Fistful of Ivory) is an autobiographical book written by Jean-Claude Vignoli about his work hunting animal traffickers in Africa. It was published by Éditions Favre in February 2023.

The book explains how, as part of his work with the NGO EAGLE, he helped wipe out a mafia network in Ivory Coast in 2018, including the sentencing of a notorious Vietnamese trafficker to 1.5 years in prison. The ivory was hidden in hollow boards and shipped by boat to the European and Asian markets. Vignoli describes the physical dangers he faced while tracking down the traffickers, as well as the psychological ones, since he had to think and act like a criminal in order to stop them.

The book aims to raise awareness of the loss of African megafauna, such as elephants, which are disappearing from the continent for financial reasons: a kilo of rhinoceros horn, for example, is traded for $100,000. In his opinion, the unbridled consumption of our societies is responsible for the disappearance of living things.
