= EAGLE (organization) =

EAGLE network (Eco Activists for Governance and Law Enforcement) is a non-governmental organisation founded by the activist Ofir Drori to combat crime linked to the trafficking of protected animals in Africa. The organisation also fights corruption, which is detected in the majority of its activities.

EAGLE collaborates with governments on investigations, arrest operations, legal follow-ups, and media campaigns to enforce the law. The organization employs investigators who have penetrated criminal networks, working with national authorities to apprehend them.

== Structure ==
EAGLE is a network of eight national non-governmental organisations in sub-Saharan Africa. The first NGO in the network is named LAGA and was created by Ofir Drori in Cameroon in 2003. Other members are Conservation Justice in Gabon created in 2017 by Luc Mathot, EAGLE Sénégal in 2017, PALF in Congo in 2010, EAGLE Togo in 2013, and EAGLE Ivory Coast in 2017.

== Arrests ==
In 20 years, the EAGLE network has led to the arrest of 2,000 traffickers an average of 100 criminals per year. In 2019, the network arrested 171 traffickers.

EAGLE Côte d'Ivoire has led to the arrest of 79 traffickers in 6 years, including a major case in 2017, with the arrest of six criminals and the seizure of half a tonne of pangolin scales, half a tonne of ivory and firearms. EAGLE Senegal is behind the biggest arrest of ivory traffickers in the country's history. In 2015, EAGLE Guinea (GALF), in cooperation with the Guinean law enforcement agencies, arrested the national CITES officer, Ansoumane Doumbouya, in a case involving the corruption of animal export permits including bonobos, gorillas and chimpanzees.

== Books ==
A book on the origin of EAGLE The Last Great Ape: A Journey Through Africa and a Fight for the Heart of the Continent was co-written by Ofir Drori and David McDannald. A second book, Pour une poignée d'ivoire, about an operation in Côte d'Ivoire in 2018, was written by Jean-Claude Vignoli.

== Documentaries ==
In 2016, The Ivory Game recounts the work of EAGLE Togo. In 2023, Conservation Justice is the subject of a documentary by Maxime Ginolin depicting the NGO activities.
