= Visa policy of Vanuatu =

Policy on permits required to enter Vanuatu

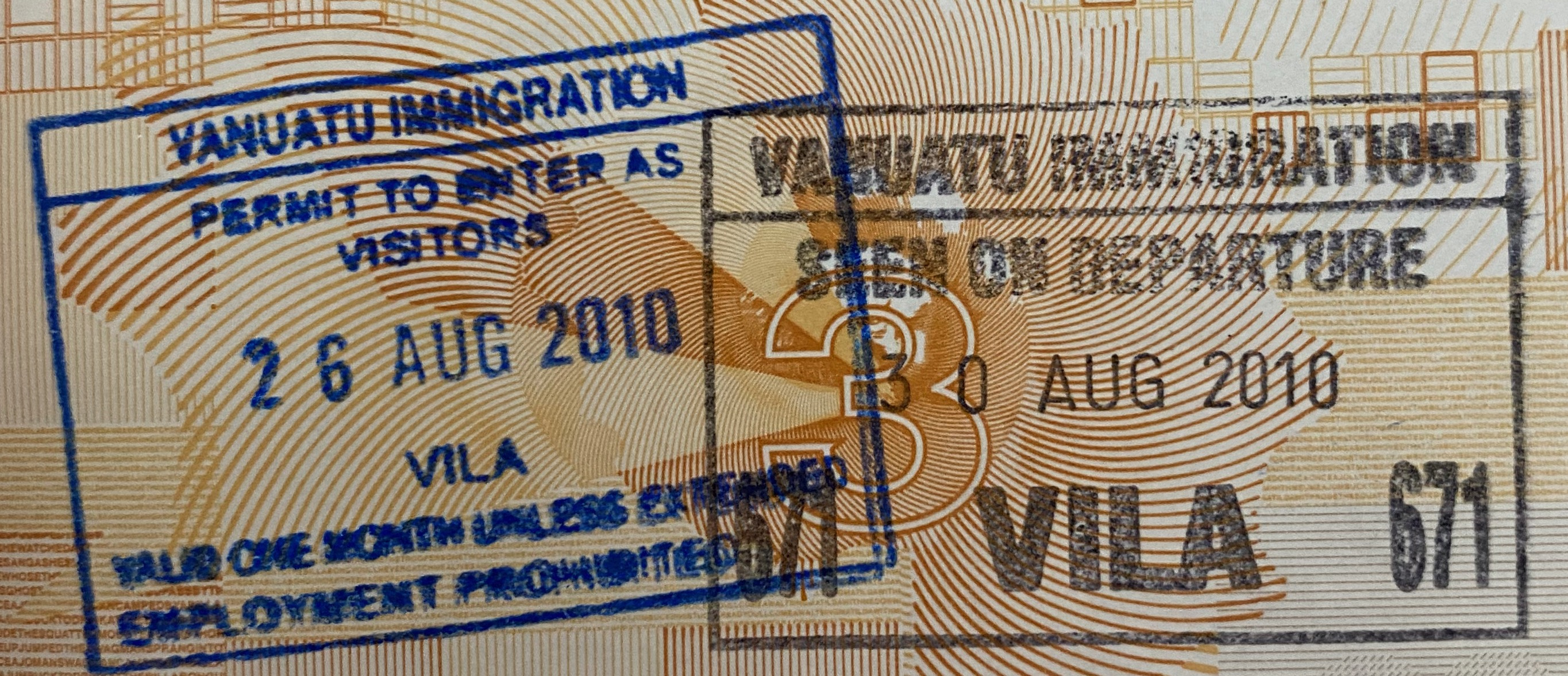
Entry and exit stamps

Visitors to Vanuatu must obtain an e-Visa unless they are citizens of one of the visa-exempt countries.

All visitors must have a passport valid for at least six months beyond their intended stay. Applicants are required to apply for visas at the proper consulate or embassy in their respective jurisdiction. Different visas issued to visitors of Vanuatu depending on the purpose of travel and the traveler's nationality. Nationals of certain countries are exempt from visa application requirements; they are also eligible to receive tourist visas, which allows recipients to remain in Vanuatu for no longer than 120 days, provided that the visit is related to family purposes, tourism, or a business meeting/conference. Recipients of tourist visas are not allowed to conduct any commercial or employment activities in the country.

Individuals from non-exempt countries may instead apply for a visitor visa, which allows for a stay of up to 30 days. Through a pre-approved application process, nationals of non-exempt countries may also receive tourist visas, which provide the same privileges afforded to those from exempt-countries.

== Visa policy map ==
Visa policy of Vanuatu Vanuatu Visa not required (120 days) eVisa

== Visa exemption ==
Citizens of the following countries and territories may enter Vanuatu without a visa for up to 120 days:

- All European Union member states

- Andorra
- Antigua and Barbuda
- Argentina
- Australia
- Azerbaijan
- Bahamas
- Bahrain
- Bangladesh
- Barbados
- Belarus
- Belize
- Botswana
- Brazil
- Brunei
- Cameroon
- Canada
- Chile
- China
- Cuba
- Dominica
- Eswatini
- Fiji
- Gambia
- Ghana
- Grenada
- Guyana
- Hong Kong
- India
- Israel
- Jamaica
- Japan
- Kenya
- Kiribati
- Kuwait
- Lesotho
- Liechtenstein
- Macau
- Malawi
- Malaysia
- Maldives
- Marshall Islands
- Mauritius
- Mexico
- Micronesia
- Morocco
- Mozambique
- Namibia
- Nauru
- New Zealand
- Nigeria
- Norway
- Oman
- Pakistan
- Palau
- Papua New Guinea
- Peru
- Philippines
- Qatar
- Rwanda
- Russia
- Saint Kitts and Nevis
- Saint Lucia
- Saint Vincent and the Grenadines
- Samoa
- San Marino
- Saudi Arabia
- Serbia
- Seychelles
- Sierra Leone
- Singapore
- Solomon Islands
- South Africa
- South Korea
- Sri Lanka
- Switzerland
- Taiwan
- Tanzania
- Thailand
- Tonga
- Trinidad and Tobago
- Tunisia
- Turkey
- Tuvalu
- Uganda
- Ukraine
- United Arab Emirates
- United Kingdom
- United States
- Uruguay
- Vatican City
- Zambia
- Zimbabwe

== Electronic visa (e-Visa) ==
Citizens of countries that require a visa may obtain an e-Visa.

== Visitor statistics ==
Most visitors arriving in Vanuatu were from the following countries of nationality:

Rank	Country or territory	2015	2014	2013
1	Australia	46,098	60,808	65,776
2	New Zealand	13,422	16,293	15,068
3	New Caledonia	10,567	12,756	12,515
4	China	2,186	1,563	1,062
5	Japan	633	763	659
6	Other Pacific Countries	5,953	6,630	4,874
7	Europe	5,839	5,591	5,544
8	North America	2,962	2,373	2,614
	Total	89,952	108,808	110,109

== See also ==
- Visa requirements for Vanuatuan citizens
