= Ofir Drori =

Israeli activist (born 1976)

Ofir Drori (Hebrew: אופיר דרורי; born 26 April 1976) is an Israeli writer and activist based in Central Africa. He started as an activist against wildlife trafficking, and expanded to anti-corruption, democracy and human rights activism throughout Africa.

== Activism ==
He is the founder of LAGA – the Last Great Ape Organisation, an enforcement non-governmental organization that fights corruption in order to bring about to the arrests and prosecutions of major wildlife criminals dealing in endangered animal species. LAGA's award-winning model for a wildlife law enforcement NGO has started in Cameroon and is now replicated in the Republic of the Congo, Gabon, Togo, Ivory Coast, Senegal, Uganda and Guinea.

In 2005, based on the experience of fighting corruption in the judiciary and the forces of law and order, he has founded another NGO, called Anti Corruption in Cameroon, or AC–Cameroon, which focuses on establishing Anti-Corruption law enforcement in Cameroon, and involving citizens in the fight against corruption through direct legal action.

Drori is a co-founder of The EAGLE Network.

== Crocodile attack ==
In December 2013, Drori was attacked by a 3-meter long Nile crocodile while vacationing along the Omo River in Ethiopia, but he managed to escape death. Despite his injuries Drori was able to survive in the wilderness for two days and reach tribesmen and eventually was evacuated to hospital in Addis Ababa, and then to a hospital in Israel. This incident is reminiscent of Australian eco-activist Val Plumwood who also survived a crocodile attack in 1985, and she subsequently wrote of it in her landmark 1996 essay "Being Prey".

== Honors and awards ==
In 2012 he was awarded the prestigious World Wildlife Fund Duke of Edinburgh Conservation Medal for his work. He also received the Interpol Ecomessage Award, The Clark Bavin Enforcement award and the Condé Nast Traveler Environment Award for his work, as well as the Future For Nature Award and the Shining World Compassion Award.

== Published works ==
Drori co-wrote The Last Great Ape: A Journey Through Africa and a Fight for the Heart of the Continent with David McDannald.
