= Vanuatu nationality law =

Vanuatu nationality law is regulated by the 1980 Constitution of Vanuatu, as amended; the 1980 Citizenship Act, and its revisions; and various international agreements to which the country is a signatory. These laws determine who is, or is eligible to be, a national of Vanuatu. Vanuatu nationality is typically obtained under the principle of jus sanguinis, i.e. by birth in Vanuatu or abroad to parents with Vanuatu nationality. It can be granted to persons with an affiliation to the country, or to a permanent resident who has lived in the country for a given period of time through naturalisation. Vanuatu has had several programs that grant honorary citizenship by investment. Nationality establishes one's international legal identity as a member of a sovereign nation. Though it is not synonymous with citizenship, for rights granted under domestic law for domestic purposes, the United Kingdom, and thus the commonwealth, have traditionally used the words interchangeably.

== Acquisition ==
Nationality in Vanuatu is acquired at birth, or later in life by registration or naturalisation.

=== By birth ===
Persons who acquire nationality at birth include:

- Persons born in Vanuatu if either parent is a national;
- Persons born abroad to at least one parent who is a national of Vanuatu.

=== By naturalisation ===
Regular naturalisation in Vanuatu is acquired by submitting an application to the Citizenship Commission responsible for immigration. Applicants must verify that they are of good character; are financially self-sufficient; and have sufficient knowledge of the civics, language and culture of Vanuatu to pass a citizenship test in the Bislama language. They must be able to demonstrate residence in the country for a minimum of ten years. Former nationals who previously lost nationality may apply for naturalisation after a five-year residency. Applicants who are approved for naturalisation are required to renounce other nationality. Persons who qualify for naturalisation include:

- The spouse of a national who is legally married after two years residence in the territory with the spouse;
- Adopted children, upon completion of an adoption order;
- Persons with indigenous ancestry, who were born in the Pacific Islands but may have been blackbirded to other areas and were disassociated from their ancestry;
- Former citizens who lost nationality based upon acquiring dual nationality, upon application without a residency requirement;
- Persons who have performed public services beneficial to the nation, such as serving overseas as a government representative, may acquire special naturalisation;
- Persons (including their spouse and children) who have made a financial investment in the development of the nation, by special process.

== Loss of nationality ==
Vanuatu nationals may renounce their nationality provided they have legal majority and capacity and have obtained other nationality, though in times of war, the renunciation may not be allowed. Denaturalisation may occur if a person obtained nationality through fraud, false representation, or concealment; served in a foreign military or government; committed crimes for which the sentence is five or more years; or obtained dual nationality without registering the status.

== Dual nationality ==
Since 2013, dual nationality has been allowed in Vanuatu, but only to those who register their status with the Citizenship Commission.

== Commonwealth citizenship ==
Vanuatuans are also Commonwealth citizens by default.

== History ==
=== Spanish period (1606–1887) ===
In 1606, Portuguese navigator Pedro Fernandes de Queirós sighted some of the islands in an archipelago he named La Austrialia del Espiritu Santo after Austria and in honor of the Hapsburg monarch, including Espiritu Santo, Gaua, Maewo, Merelava, Merig, Ureparapara, Vanua Lava. He claimed the land for Spain and established a colony on Espiritu Santo on the bay he named Bahía de San Felipe y Santiago, but abandoned the settlement after one month. Europeans did not encounter the islands again until the late eighteenth century. In 1768, French explorer Louis Antoine de Bougainville sighted Aoba, Espiritu Santo, Maewo, Malakula, and Pentecost Island, among other islands in the group, which he called the Great Cyclades. In 1774, the British navigator and explorer, James Cook made extensive investigations of the area, identifying islands in the north, south, and center of the chain he named New Hebrides. Vasily Golovnin, a Russian admiral also explored the area in 1809.

From 1828, after the discovery of sandalwood on Erromango at Dillon's Bay, European contact became more frequent. Missionaries began establishing churches from 1839, in the hopes of tempering the unscrupulous behavior of traders and blackbirders. In 1845, French missionaries established missions in nearby New Caledonia leading to colonisation there in 1853. Alarmed by the growing French presence, Australia began pressuring Britain to extend sovereignty to the New Hebrides, but Britain was reluctant. Discovery of gold in the region and a cotton boom, fueled settlement by British and French subjects, who made private arrangements with the traditional communities to settle in the 1860s. In 1878, Britain and France agreed that the Hebrides should remain neutral territory and independent. With a drop in cotton prices in the 1880s, many settlers began selling their properties to the Compagnie Caledonienne des Nouvelles Hebrides (Caledonian Company of the New Hebrides), founded by John Higginson in 1882. Higginson was an Anglo-Irishman who had been granted French nationality for establishing nickel mining in New Caledonia and was interested in forcing the French to annex the area to increase trade. His vigorous efforts to colonise, as well as German expansionism in the Pacific Islands, led to British intervention to halt French annexation in 1882 and 1884, before finally reaching an Anglo-French agreement in 1887 for establishing a joint naval commission to administrate affairs in the Hebrides.

=== Anglo-French period (1887–1980) ===
The 1887 agreement was designed to protect British and French subjects and their property and did not give authority for intervention in affairs of the indigenous people. It became evident that without a legal foundation for administrative and judicial functionaries to operate within, disputes could not be settled and tensions would continue. In 1904 the system failed completely and a commission was established to develop a system of co-sovereignty over the islands. By this time, Higginson owned one-third of the land in the New Hebrides and there were twice as many French settlers in the territory as British settlers. The Anglo-French Condominium was established by the Anglo-French Convention of 1906 which created a tripartite system in which public services and security were to be managed jointly and each power retained authority over its own subjects. For nationality, that meant that British subjects were bound by British nationality law, French subjects were bound by French nationality law, and the native inhabitants were to follow customary rules as enforced by their chiefs. Protected status was not to be issued by either Britain or France over the native population. For legal matters, native persons were to choose within six months of the execution of the Convention whether they chose to follow the British or the French legal system. Women and children fell under the authority of their spouse, or in the case of an unmarried indigenous woman, under the authority of her tribal chief. High commissioners were allowed to make laws to ensure that law and order prevailed, but had no authority to codify customary law. The 1906 Convention was replaced in 1914 retaining the same nationality scheme.

From the 1960s, many former colonies began pressing for independence. Britain favored decolonisation if that was the desire of the local inhabitants. The French favoured maintaining colonial authority until possessions were able to self-manage. The French authorities finally agreed to independence and in 1977, a conference was held in Paris to delineate the system to be used for acquiring independence. At the meeting, it was agreed that internal self-government for the New Hebrides would begin on 16 August 1978 and a referendum on independence would be scheduled. In September 1979 a draft constitution was approved by the political leadership of the country represented by an all-party committee. Parliamentary elections followed in November of that year, and despite political unrest, independence went forward on 30 July 1980, changing the name of the New Hebrides to Vanuatu.

==== British subjects ====
British subjects under the British Nationality and Status of Aliens Act 1914 followed the imperial nationality scheme which was common throughout the realm. The uniform law, which went into effect on 1 January 1915, required a married woman to derive her nationality from her spouse, meaning if he was British, she was also, and if he was foreign, so was she. It stipulated that upon loss of nationality of a husband, a wife could declare that she wished to remain British and provided that if a marriage had terminated, through death or divorce, a British-born national who had lost her status through marriage could reacquire British nationality through naturalisation without meeting a residency requirement. The statute reiterated common law provisions for natural-born persons born within the realm on or after the effective date. By using the word person, the statute nullified legitimacy requirements for jus soli nationals, allowing illegitimate children to acquire the nationality of their mother. For those born abroad on or after the effective date, legitimacy was still required, and could only be derived by a child from a British father (one generation), who was natural-born or naturalised. Naturalisations required five years residence or service to the crown.

Amendments to the British Nationality Act were enacted in 1918, 1922, 1933 and 1943 changing derivative nationality by descent and modifying slightly provisions for women to lose their nationality upon marriage. Because of a rise in statelessness, a woman who did not automatically acquire her husband's nationality upon marriage or upon his naturalisation in another country, did not lose their British status after 1933. The 1943 revision allowed a child born abroad at any time to be a British national by descent if the Secretary of State agreed to register the birth. Under the terms of the British Nationality Act 1948, the basic British nationality scheme did not change overmuch, and typically those who were previously defined as British remained the same. Changes included that wives and children no longer automatically acquired the status of the husband or father, children who acquired nationality by descent no longer were required to make a retention declaration, and registrations for children born abroad were extended.

==== French subjects ====
In 1804, the Napoleonic Code, or the French Civil Code, was implemented. In the French colonies, it applied only to the European population. Under the Civil Code, women were legally incapacitated and paternal authority was established over children. It required that upon marriage, a woman automatically obtain the same nationality as her spouse. Illegitimate children were barred from inheritance and nationality could only be transmitted through a father (jus sanguinis). The Nationality Law of 1889 codified French nationality statutes, establishing jus soli nationals, children born on French soil, could become French by birth even if their parents were foreign, provided that when they reached the age of majority they met residence restrictions. It allowed women who would become stateless to retain their French nationality upon marriage. The law was extended to the colonies of Guadeloupe, Martinique, and Réunion, as well as to Algeria (except to the native population), but not other French possessions. French nationality law from 1889, remained stable with minor changes to eliminate inequalities between colonial subjects and genders.

In 1897, a decree extending the nationality law to the other French territories expressly stated that it did not apply to native-born inhabitants and clarified that birth on colonial soil did not confer French nationality via jus soli. The French Nationality Law of 1927 eliminated provisions for French women to derive their nationality from their spouse. The change also allowed children to obtain nationality through their mothers. In 1945 a new Nationality Ordinance changed the provisions regarding women. Foreign women automatically became French if they married a French husband and French women retained their nationality, unless in either case they declared prior to the marriage acceptance or refusal of a change in nationality. The French Nationality Law of 1973 removed all remaining inequalities in nationality rights of men, women and legitimate children. It also granted automatic nationality to children born in France if either of their parents had been born in the former French colonies or territories.

==== Native inhabitants ====
The Convention defined native persons as any Pacific Islander person who was aboriginal and neither British nor French. The native inhabitants of the New Hebrides remained stateless throughout the period the Condominium was in effect, unless a native woman married a British or French subject, or had children with a British or French subject. Because legal marriage between natives and Europeans was rare in the New Hebrides, or unrecognized by British and French authorities, few wives, or legitimate children were able to claim nationality through their husbands or fathers. After the passage of the 1948 British Nationality Law, children born to British subjects and native wives could apply to the British Resident Commissioner for a status known as Local British Protected Person. It did not give them status as a British subject nor as a British protected person, but could be used to obtain a British Travel Document. Until 1980, when they gained independence, the lack of nationality for New Hebrideans was a violation of the 1948 Universal Declaration of Human Rights, which guarantees a right to nationality.

=== Post-independence (1980–present) ===
At independence, as there was no order for loss of nationality, anyone who had obtained British or French nationality remained British or French. Under the constitution, ni-Vanuatu were defined as anyone who had four grandparents who belonged to an indigenous group of the New Hebrides or persons who had New Hebridean ancestry and were stateless. Nationality at independence was conferred upon ni-Vanuatu so described and after independence to persons born anywhere to at least one parent who was ni-Vanuatu. Some mixed-race persons remained stateless as they did not have ni-Vanuatu ancestry, though they (or other foreigners) could apply for naturalisation if they had resided in the territory for ten years. Dual nationality was not permitted and naturalisation required renunciation of other nationality.

The Citizenship Act of 1980 did not allow the husband of a ni-Vanuatu wife to derive nationality from her. It required that if she had lost her nationality by marrying a foreigner, a wife could only repatriate if the marriage had terminated. It allowed husbands to include their wives and minor children in naturalisation petitions, but wives could not include a spouse or children. In 2013, the Parliament passed a constitutional amendment to allow for dual nationality. It was specifically drafted to address those whose ancestors had been blackbirded from Vanuatu. Changes that year to the Citizenship Act were amendments to Section 10, which removed gender distinctions for acquiring nationality through marriage. A 2014 Universal Periodic Review by the United Nations Human Rights Council noted that adoptees automatically gained the nationality of their father, but not their mother. The law also disallowed adoption by a female child if the sole adopter was male, unless there existed special circumstances.

Since independence, Vanuatu has offered numerous immigrant investor programmes. The Capital Investment Immigration Plan was instituted in 2014; the Vanuatu Economic Rehabilitation Program began in 2015 and ended in 2017; and the Development Support Program launched in 2017. Each of the programs has provided honorary citizenship to investors, their spouse, and children who contribute to the development of the country. Honorary citizenship allows for the investor to obtain a passport, but they may not be involved in politics or political parties and may not hold public office. Persons who apply may not have a criminal history and must pass the background check initiated by government authorities. The minimum investment required in 2019 was $130,000 US with a government fee of $80,000 US and there is no residency requirement. In 2021, the government was considering plans to extend nationality to stateless persons via the investment programmes.
