= Universal Periodic Review =

UN human rights reporting process

The Universal Periodic Review (UPR) is a mechanism of the United Nations (UN) Human Rights Council (HRC) that emerged from the 2005 UN reform process. Established by the General Assembly resolution 60/251 of 3 April 2006, the UPR periodically examines the human rights performance of all 193 UN Member States. It is intended to complement, not duplicate, the work of other human rights mechanisms, including the UN human rights treaty bodies. This is the first international human rights mechanism to address all countries and all human rights. The Working Group on the UPR, which is composed of the HRC's 47 Member States and chaired by the HRC President, conducts country reviews.

== History ==
Since its inception in 2008, four states have withdrawn participation in the UPR. Under the second Donald Trump administration, the United States withdrew its participation.

== Principles and objectives ==
HRC Resolution 5/1 of 18 June 2007 and HRC decision 6/102 of 27 September 2007 elaborated on the UPR's functions in its first cycle from 2008 - 2012. For the second and subsequent cycles, a few amendments were introduced to the UPR by HRC Resolution 16/21 of 12 April 2011 and HRC decision 17/119 of 19 July 2011, after a review by the HRC (for further details, see HRC review process below). HRC resolution 5/1 provides that the UPR should:

- Promote the universality, interdependence, indivisibility and interrelatedness of all human rights
- Be a cooperative mechanism based on objective and reliable information and on interactive dialogue
- Ensure universal coverage and equal treatment of all States
- Be an intergovernmental process, UN Member-driven and action oriented
- Fully involve the country under review
- Complement and not duplicate other human rights mechanisms, thus representing an added value
- Be conducted in an objective, transparent, non-selective, constructive, non-confrontational and non-politicized manner
- Not be overly burdensome to the concerned State or to the agenda of the HRC
- Not be overly long; it should be realistic and not absorb a disproportionate amount of time or human and financial resources
- Not diminish the HRC's capacity to respond to urgent human rights situations
- Fully integrate a gender perspective
- Take into account the level of development and specificities of countries
- Ensure the participation of all relevant stakeholders, including non-governmental organizations (NGOs) and national human rights institutions (NHRIs).

The objectives of the UN-UPR are:

- The improvement of the human rights situation on the ground
- The fulfilment of the State's human rights obligations and commitments and assessment of positive developments and challenges faced by the State
- The enhancement of the State's capacity and of technical assistance, in consultation with, and with the consent of, the State concerned
- The sharing of best practice among States and other stakeholders
- Support for cooperation in the promotion and protection of human rights
- The encouragement of full cooperation and engagement with the HRC, other human rights bodies and the Office of the UN High Commissioner for Human Rights (OHCHR).

HRC resolution 16/21 further provides that the second and subsequent cycles should focus on the implementation of the accepted recommendations and the developments of the human rights situation in the State under review.

== Procedure ==
=== UPR cycle ===
While the first UPR operated on a four-year cycle, the second was extended to four and a half years, and the third lasts five years. Forty-two States are now reviewed each year during three sessions of the HRC's Working Group on the UPR, with 14 States reviewed at each session. The HRC determined the order of review for the first UPR cycle (2008–2012) on 21 September 2007 through the drawing of lots and the same order will be maintained during the second and subsequent cycles. The first order of review was instructed by the resolution 5/1 requirements that all 47 member States of the HRC be reviewed during their term of membership, in addition to a few other criteria.

=== Basis of country reviews ===
The basis of country reviews is: (a) the Charter of the UN; (b) the Universal Declaration of Human Rights; (c) human rights instruments to which a State is party; and (d) voluntary pledges and commitments made by the State, including those undertaken when presenting their candidature for election to the HRC. Country reviews also take into account applicable international humanitarian law.

=== Documentation upon which country reviews are based ===
Country reviews are based on three documents:

- A 20-page national report prepared by the State under review
- A ten-page compilation of UN information (including Special Procedures reports, human rights treaty body reports, and other relevant UN documentation) prepared by OHCHR
- A ten-page summary of information received from stakeholders (including NHRIs, NGOs, and other civil society actors) also prepared by the OHCHR

In decision 6/102, the HRC provided guidelines for the preparation of information under the UPR. It specifies that States, in preparing national reports, should address/provide:

- A description of the methodology and the broad consultation process followed for the preparation of information provided under the UPR
- Background of the country under review and framework (particularly normative and institutional framework) for the promotion and protection of human rights: constitution, legislation, policy measures, national jurisprudence, human rights infrastructure including NHRIs, and scope of international obligations identified in the "basis of review" in resolution 5/1
- Promotion and protection of human rights on the ground: implementation of international human rights obligations identified in the "basis of review" in resolution 5/1, national legislation and voluntary commitments, NHRI activities, public awareness of human rights, cooperation with human rights mechanisms
- Identification of achievements, best practices, challenges and constraints
- Key national priorities, initiatives and commitments that the State concerned intends to undertake to overcome those challenges and constraints and improve its human rights situation
- Expectations of the State concerned in terms of capacity-building and requests, if any, for technical assistance; and
- In the second and subsequent UPR cycles, this should also contain a presentation by the State concerned of its work on the follow-up to the previous review.

=== Working Group on the UPR ===
The Working Group on the UPR is composed by the 47 Member States of the HRC, chaired by the HRC President and conducts country reviews. The Working Group held its first review in 2008. It allocates three and a half hours to each review, 70 minutes of which is given to the State under review to discuss its domestic human rights framework, measures taken to promote and protect human rights in country, human rights issues of particular national pertinence, and steps taken to address and redress violations. It is also an opportunity for the State to present voluntary human rights pledges and commitments. An interactive dialogue of 140 minutes follows the State's presentation, during which UN member States question the State and make recommendations towards the improvement of its human rights situation and performance. It is worth noting that all 193 UN member states (both HRC members and not) can take the floor.

A wide variety of issues have been addressed during the country reviews and potentially all human rights issues could be addressed during this session. While the counting of the actual number of recommendations is complicated by the fact that they are clustered together in the Working Group report, the NGO UPR Info has calculated the first cycle of the UPR to have provided a total of 21,356 recommendations and 599 voluntary pledges.

=== The role of the Troika and drafting of the Working Group report ===
Each review is facilitated by a group of three States, known as the "troika", that serve as rapporteurs. The troika is responsible for receiving the advanced questions from UN member States to the country under review. The second role of the troika is to prepare an outcome document on the review, which includes a summary of the review proceedings, recommendations suggested by States, conclusions, and voluntary commitments presented by the State under review. The outcome document is prepared with the assistance of the UPR secretariat and the recommendations contained in the outcome of the review should preferably be clustered thematically with the full involvement and consent of the State under review and the States that made the recommendations.

=== Adoption ===
Thirty minutes are allocated to the adoption of the outcome document at a later stage in the same Working Group session, during which the State under review is given a preliminary opportunity to indicate whether it supports the recommendations suggested to it by States as well as the conclusions reflected in the outcome document. Once adopted, the outcome document is transferred to the HRC for discussion and adoption in plenary. In the intervening period between the Working Group and plenary sessions, the reviewed State is expected to confirm which UPR recommendations it accepts and does not accept.

=== HRC plenary session ===
The UPR is a standing item on the HRC's agenda (item 6). At each HRC session, time is allocated to the consideration and adoption of the outcome documents transferred from the Working Group on the UPR. An hour is allocated to the adoption of each document, during which the reviewed State is offered the opportunity to present replies to questions or issues not sufficiently addressed during the interactive dialogue at the Working Group. HRC member and observer States are also given the opportunity to express their views on the outcome of the review before the HRC takes action on it. NHRIs with 'A' status and NGOs in consultative status with the UN Economic and Social Council (ECOSOC) have the opportunity to make 'general comments' before the adoption of the outcome report. This is the only opportunity for civil society to take the floor during the UPR.

=== Follow-up to UPR outcome ===
While the outcome of the review, as a cooperative mechanism, should be implemented primarily by the State concerned, States are encouraged to conduct broad consultations with all relevant stakeholders in this regard.

States are encouraged to provide the Council, on a voluntary basis, with a midterm update on follow-up to accepted recommendations. As of 20 February 2013, 28 countries so far have provided the HRC with an implementation report.

According to Resolution 16/21, other relevant stakeholders are encouraged to include information on the follow-up to the preceding review in their contributions. The summary of the information provided by other relevant stakeholders should contain, where appropriate, a separate section for contributions by the national human rights institution of the State under review that is accredited in full compliance with the Paris Principles.

The Voluntary Fund for Financial and Technical Assistance, established by the Council in its resolution 6/17, should be strengthened and operationalized in order to provide a source of financial and technical assistance to help countries to implement the recommendations emanating from their review.

States may request the United Nations representation at the national or regional level to assist them in the implementation of the follow-up to their review. Financial and technical assistance for the implementation of the review should support national needs and priorities, as may be reflected in national implementation plans.

The NGO UPR Info has from 2011 to 2014 undertaken 165 assessments at a two-years distance after the review in order to see how the recommendations (the main UPR outcome) are implemented, and what is the real effect of the UPR on the ground. In 2012 it published its first study on the assessment of these implementations by 66 countries. A second publication followed in 2014, titled Beyond Promises, assessed 165 countries and shared best practices observed from States, NHRIs, and NGOs. A third publication, released in 2016 and dubbed The Butterfly Effect, aimed to spread UPR best practices and inspire all actors.

=== State non-cooperation with the UPR ===
After exhausting all efforts to encourage a State to cooperate with the UPR mechanism, the HRC will address, as appropriate, cases of persistent non-cooperation with the mechanism.

The first case where persistent non-cooperation was discussed is Israel's UPR. Israel was not reviewed as scheduled on 29 January 2013. As a consequence, the HRC discussed in March and June 2013 the issue of "persistent non-cooperation". Eventually, Israel resumed its cooperation with the HRC and was reviewed on 29 October 2013, but the HRC missed the opportunity to define what "persistent non-cooperation" is.

=== Stakeholders UPR contribution opportunities ===
The rules governing the participation of NHRIs and NGOs at the HRC, and therefore in the UPR mechanism, are prescribed by resolution 5/1, which states that their participation shall be based on the 'practices observed by the [former] Commission on Human Rights, while ensuring the most effective contribution of these entities'.

While the UPR is an intergovernmental process, a number of opportunities for contribution are available to non-governmental stakeholders. These include:

- Participating in national consultations for the preparation of a State's national report. States are encouraged to undertake broad national consultation processes towards the preparation of their national reports
- Submitting information to State reviews. Submissions may be incorporated into the OHCHR-prepared summary of stakeholders' information discussed above
- Attending the review of the State at the Working Group on the UPR. Stakeholders may attend Working Group sessions, but cannot participate in the interactive dialogue
- Attending the HRC session at which the outcome report on a State is adopted. 'A' status NHRIs and ECOSOC-accredited NGOs may make 'general comments' before the adoption of the outcome report
- Submitting written statements under HRC agenda item 6 (UPR). NHRIs and ECOSOC-accredited NGOs can submit written statements
- When appropriate, working on the follow-up of UPR recommendations

== HRC review process ==
In resolution 60/251, the General Assembly required the HRC to review and report on its work and functioning after its first five years. In October 2009, the HRC established the open-ended intergovernmental working group on the review of the work and functioning of the HRC (composed by the 47 member States of the HRC) to lead its review process. Chaired by the then HRC President (Ambassador Sihasak Phuangketkeow of Thailand), the Working Group met for two substantive sessions. The first Working Group session took place on 25–29 October 2010; the second session was held on 7, 17-18, and 23–24 February 2011.

On 25 March 2011, the HRC adopted as resolution 16/21 the outcome of its review of the work and functioning of the HRC, later followed by HRC decision 17/119 of 19 July 2011 with the following changes to the UPR:

- Length of the next cycles: The second and subsequent cycles will last 4.5 years with 14 sessions per cycle
- Number of States per session: 14 States will be reviewed per session, in a total of 42 states per year
- Duration of the review: Each country review will last 3.5 hours. The State under Review (SuR) will be given 70 minutes and other States 140 minutes
- Order of review: The order of review will be exactly the same. As there will be only by 14 States reviewed per session, the two last States of session 1 will be moved to the beginning of session 2, the last four of session 2 will be moved to the beginning of session 3, etc.
- Focus of the next cycles: The second and subsequent cycles of the review should focus on, inter alia, the implementation of the accepted recommendations and the developments of the human rights situation in the SuR
- List of speakers: For each review, States will be arranged in English alphabetical order and the first state of the list will be drawn by lot. States will be able to swap place and all States will be given the floor. If needed be, time per speakers will be reduced to two minutes each or the 140 minutes will be divided by the number of speakers.
- General guidelines: The General Guidelines Decision A/HRC/DEC/6/102 for the drafting of the three reports that form the basis of the review were slightly modified to give greater emphasis on the need for States to report on the implementation of recommendations
- Clustering of recommendations: The recommendations contained in the UPR outcome document should preferably be clustered thematically, with the full involvement and consent of the State under review and the States that made the recommendations
- Responses to recommendations: States should clearly communicate to the Council, in a written format preferably prior to the Council plenary, its positions on all received recommendations
- Mid-term reports: States are encouraged to provide the Council, on a voluntary basis, with a midterm update on follow-up to accepted recommendations
- Role of National human rights institutions: National Human Rights Institutions (NHRIs) with A status will have a dedicated section in the summary of other stakeholders' information and will be given the floor directly after the SuR during the adoption at the HRC plenary session
- Role of NGOs: States are encouraged to conduct broad consultations with all relevant stakeholders on the follow-up. Other relevant stakeholders are encouraged to include information on the follow-up to the preceding review in their contributions

== Updates ==
- On September 28, 2026, civil society organizations submitted formal letters to United Nations leadership addressing the decision by the United States government to abstain from the Universal Periodic Review process. The correspondence documents instances of domestic non-compliance and requests that UN bodies implement formal measures to address the absence of a member state from the review cycle. The communications emphasize the institutional implications of a state bypassing multilateral human rights evaluations. The organizations request that UN officials establish procedural standards to address state non-cooperation and maintain the enforcement of international review mechanisms.
