= Eromanga =

Eromanga or Erromanga may refer to:

- Eromanga, Queensland, Australia
  - Eromanga Refinery, a small oil refinery in the town
- Eromanga Basin, Australia
  - Eromanga Sea, a prehistoric epicontinental sea that once covered the Eromanga Basin
- Erromanga or Erromango, formerly Martyr's Island, an island in Vanuatu
  - Erromanga language, the primary language of the island
  - Erromanga languages, a group of related languages
  - Erromanga (ship), several ships named after the island
- Eromanga, from "Erotic" + "manga", one of the original Japanese terms for hentai manga
  - Eromanga Sensei, a Japanese light novel and anime series, and the fictional illustrator who appear in them
