= Erromanga language =

Austronesian language spoken in Vanuatu

Sie
- Erromangan
- Region: Southern Vanuatu
- Native speakers: (1,900 cited 2001)
- Language family: Austronesian: Malayo-Polynesian; Oceanic; Southern Oceanic; South Vanuatu; Erromangan; Sie

Language codes
- ISO 639-3: erg
- Glottolog: siee1239
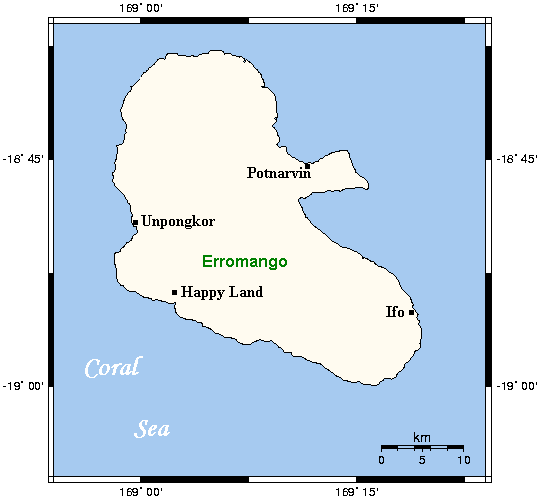
- Erromango Island

- Sie is not endangered according to the classification system of the UNESCO Atlas of the World's Languages in Danger

Erromangan, or Sie (Sye), is the primary language spoken on the island Erromango in the Tafea region of the Vanuatu islands. The other Erromanga languages are either moribund or extinct. Although the island is quite large (887 km^{2}), the total number of speakers of Erromango is estimated at 1900.

== Linguistic situation ==
Sye is close to being the only language on Erromango. There were once four—Sye, Sorung, Ura and Utaha—but the latter three are extinct apart from a handful of recently discovered Ura speakers. Terry Crowley counted six speakers of Ura in the mid-1990s. The South Vanuatu language group includes these four languages.

Erromango Island was once much more diverse linguistically. In the nineteenth century a massive depopulation took place and the languages were realigned. Terry Crowley states that there would have been three different languages prior to European contact.

=== Work on the language ===
The earliest published account of Erromangan languages is Gordon (1889), whose notes, which he took on the island, were published posthumously. Capell produced a description of the language in the 1920s on the basis of the same materials that were used before by Ray, another scholar. This sketch was never published but it is referred to in detail, however, in unpublished correspondence dated 1927 from Dempwolff to Ray, so he obviously had copies passed on to others.

John Lynch gathered new material from speakers of Erromangan in the 1960s and 1970s. A description combining the resources of both his and Capell's work was felt to be feasible and a detailed grammatical sketch was published by Lynch and Capell. Capell's description bases on translated sources, while Lynch's notes base on the spoken language. They published in 1983 and made clear that their work had to be regarded as provisional and to be supplemented.

== Dialects ==
The Erromangan language today is dialectally fairly homogeneous. There is very little difference spoken on the coast of the island. While the pre-contact population of the island has been estimated at 6.000 people³, this number dropped to 400 by 1931. Entire villages became unviable through loss of population and people were apparently constantly building and reconstituting new villages, larger than the old ones and on a different place on the island. This huge demographic change took place in recent historical times. Thus, it is not too surprising that there is relatively little dialectal diversity.

Erromangans will point out quickly the differences in the language of the people from Potnarvin and Dillon's Bay but for an outsider these are very small. There are just some differences in very low-frequency lexical items.

== Phonology ==
=== Consonants ===
	Labial	Alveolar	Palatal	Velar	Glottal
Nasal	m	n		ŋ	
Plosive	p	t		k	
Fricative	v	s		ɣ	h
Rhotic		r			
Lateral		l			
Semivowel	w		j		

- /s/ is heard as [ʃ] when preceding /t/.
- /r/ is heard as [d] when following /n/. Elsewhere, it is heard as a trill [r] or tap [ɾ].

=== Vowels ===
	Front	Central	Back
Close	i		u
Mid	e		o
Open		a	

The main difference between the Southern Vanuatu vowel systems lies in the status of the mid central vowel, which was present in the proto-language. This vowel is not present in Anejom̃, while it is in the Tanna languages. In Erromango, however, while there is evidence for an underlying contrastive schwa /ə/, it does not contrast at the surface level of representation.

== Typological overview and examples ==
=== Morphology ===
Other than languages from the North Central Vanuatu subgroup the languages of the Southern Vanuatu subgroup have a rather complex morphology. The phonemes are simple but the phonotactics of Sye allow a wide range of consonant clusters. They stand mostly in the middle of words and can occur at initial and end position, too.

/nentrap/ [nendraph] 'hibiscus'
/retpon/ [retpon] 'his wife'
/navwanr/ [navwand] 'bubble'
/itsoŋku/ [itʃoŋku] 'whole'

=== Word classes ===
Sye is typological fairly typical for an Oceanic language with regard to word classes. Both number and type of class that are needed are normal as well as the extent of multifunctionality. The productive use of prefixes and compounding is also typical. Less productive are suffixes.

=== Reduplication ===
Reduplication is attested in Sye, but to a much smaller extent than it is in other Oceanic languages with regard to productivity.

isut 'far away' > isutisut 'very far away'
metuv 'softly' > metuvmetuv 'very softly'
omol 'fall' > omolomol 'fall all over'
potvon 'short' > potvonpotvon 'very short'

There is, however, a considerable amount of inflectional affixation in the nominal, prepositional and verbal morphology.

=== Inflection ===
Inflectional morphology with Sye noun phrases is restricted to the marking of number and some types of possession. In the example shown below, the suffix /-me/ is used to indicate the plural form of 'who'.

Kem-antehep nandu [mei]
2SG:PRES-MR:sit ACC.SG who
'Who (singular) are you sitting with?'

Kem-antehep ndal [mei-me]
2SG:PRES-MR:sit ACC.PL who-PL
'Who (plural) are you sitting with?'

=== Affixation ===
Verbs are obligatorily marked by prefixes that express a wide range of subject categories and a number of orders of optional prefixes, which appear between the prefixes and the stem. Because this aspect is rather complex the example, which shows the prefixation of /tovop/ is preceded by a brief overview of the prefix order:

SUBJECT (PRIOR PAST) (ITERATIVE) (NEGATIVE) (EM-) STEM.

koh koku-tovop
1NONSG.INCL 1DU.INCL:RECPAST-BR:laugh
'we (both) laughed'

koh koli-tovop
1NONSG.INCL 1PL.INCL:RECPAST-BR:laugh
'we (all) laughed'

Alienable possession is marked on phrase level; inalienable possession would be indicated on nouns.

=== Syntax ===
Sye is a classical SVO language in that it has postmodifying adjectives as well as prepositions within the noun phrase. The fairly large set of prepositions makes it unusual. The absence of the widespread patterns of serial verbs makes Sye different from other Oceanic languages.

=== Echo-subject construction ===
Lacking serial verbs, Sye – along with the other languages of the Southern Vanuatu subgroup – has what we can refer to as an echo subject construction. A verb that has the same subject as the preceding verb is marked with a special reduced set of prefixes which replace the full set of subject prefixes. In the first of the following three examples just the verb /kamlitouri/ receives full inflection. The following verbs /mlitantvi/ ('and we crossed'), /mlisac/ ('and we went up') and /mlitelwogi/ ('and we went past') all carry echo subject markers. The second and the third example follow the same structure, however, in the third example the concurrence of the two events of departing and arriving is hard to grasp for non-Erromango speakers.

Kamli-tour-i ovon kuri mli-tantvi nu mli-sac mli-telwog-i ovon nenduc.
1PL.EXCL:DISTPAST-BR:lead-CONST PL dog PL:ES-BR:cross river PL:ES-ascend PL:ES-BR:go.past-CONST PL garden
'We led the dogs and crossed the river and went up past the gardens.'

{Misi Ravosen} yi-vai m-hac Unpogkor {mute (< mu-ete)} yuwi nandu.
{missionary Robertson} 3SG:DISTPAST-BR:take SG:ES-go.up Unpogkor PL:ES-BR:stay there together
'The missionary Robertson took him up to Unpogkor and they stayed there together.'

Y-owi nur Vila m-tolki eni-wi.
3SG:DISTPAST-BR:leave place Vila SG:ES-BR:return POSS:3SG-TOP
'(S)he left Vila and (thereby) returned home.'

=== Number ===
The near categorical marking of number on nouns is another important feature of the nominal morphology of Sye. The following examples describe three of the noun premodifiers of Sye: hai 'indefinite', ovon 'plural' and ndve 'how much?, how many'. Square brackets surround the noun phrase being illustrated.

{Kandvi (⟨ko-andəv-i)} [hai nei].
2SG:FUT-MR:cut-CONST INDEF stick
'You will cut a stick.'

Kole-nompi [ovon syame iyih].
1PL:INCL:FUT-MR:do PL things this
'We will do those things.'

Koc-vai [ndve nvat]?
2SG:RECPAST-BR:get how.many stone
'How many stones did you get?'

Accompanying adjectives are also marked for number.

=== Subject markers ===
Subjects are marked by verbal prefixes, while objects are indicated through verbal suffixes. Both are common in Oceanic languages. There is a huge number of distinct inflectional sets of subject markers on verbs expressing a variety of tense-aspect-mood categories. Not only is this an unusually large number of inflectional categories, but many of these categories are discontinuously marked by combinations of morphotactically separate prefixes for which the constituent forms do not always have definable meanings of their own.

=== Verb morphology ===
A complex scheme of root-initial mutation is a salient feature of the verb morphology of Erromangan languages in general. Different root forms are determined by the nature of the preceding morphological environment. This stands in typological contrast to the other Central Vanuatu languages which have root forms that are invariant. Sye shares this pattern with the languages of Central Vanuatu, though the patterns of these languages are different in some other respects.

=== Possession ===
A characteristic of Sye is its lack of separately marked possessive constructions for a variety of alienable categories, such as food and drink possession. These forms are typical for Oceanic languages. But Sye has separate constructions which are typically associated with the expression of alienable and inalienable possession.

== Abbreviations used ==
ACC.PL	plural accompanitive
ACC.SG	singular accompanitive
BR	basic root
CONST	construct suffix
DISTPAST	distant past
DU	dual
ES	echo subject
EXCL	exclusive
FUT	future
INCL	inclusive
INDEF	indefinite
MR	modified root
NONSG	non-singular
PL	plural
PRES	present
RECPAST	recent past
SG	singular
TOP	toponymic

== Literature ==
- Capell, A. and Lynch, J. 1983. "Sie vocabulary". In Lynch (1983a) Studies in the languages of Erromango, pp. 75–147. Pacific Linguistics, Series C, No. 79. Canberra: AUSTRALIAN National University.
- Crowley, Terry. 2002. Sye. In John Lynch and Malcolm Ross and Terry Crowley (eds.), The Oceanic Languages, 694-722. Richmond: Curzon.
- Crowley, Terry. 1999. "Ura : a disappearing language of Southern Vanuatu Canberra". Pacific Linguistics, Research School of Pacific and Asian Studies. The Australian National University.
- Crowley, Terry. 1998. An Erromangean (Sye) Grammar. University of Hawaiʻi Press.
- Crowley, Terry. 1991. "Parallel development and shared innovation: some developments in Central Vanuatu inflectional morphology". Oceanic Linguistics 30(2): 179-222.
- Gordon, Rev. J. D. 1889. "Sketch of the Erromangan Grammar". In Rev. D. MacDonald (ed.) Three New Hebrides languages (Efatese, Eromangan, Santo), pp. 61–84. Melbourne: Edgerton and Moore.

== Materials ==
- Paradisec has a number of collections that include Erromangan materials, including two from Arthur Cappell (AC1, AC2) and one from Terrance Crowley (TC7).
