= Flora Vano =

Ni-Vanuatuan climate activist

Flora Vano (born 1984 or 1985) is a Ni-Vanuatu charity worker and an environmental spokesperson. She has represented Vanuatu, a country very vulnerable to climate change, at the 2022, 2023 and 2024 United Nations Climate Change Conferences, known as COPs.

== Career ==
Vano was born in 1984 or 1985, reportedly being 39 on 17 November 2024. She is the granddaughter of a high chief and says that one of the lessons she was taught was to look after her community.

After working in the tourism sector, she joined the ActionAid charity in 2017 and began to work on activities to address the impact of Cyclone Pam in Vanuatu. She then played an important role in setting up the ActionAid Vanuatu country office and now leads that office, which concentrates on women-led protection of women, and climate change adaptation and resilience, as well as responding to COVID-19.

One of the main areas in which Vano has worked has been ActionAid's Woman I TokTok Tugeta (WITTT) network (Women Talking Together Network) to support women in preparing for disasters and lead their communities to do this. The women-driven forum brings together over 5000 women from the islands of Erromango, Tanna, Malakula, and Malo to discuss the role of women in mitigating the impact of natural disasters. Activities undertaken include helping women to access clean drinking water by installing water tanks in homes. Particular attention is paid to the needs of women with disabilities.

In March 2023, Vanuatu was struck by two powerful cyclones within days of each other. Women from the WITTT Network played an important role in ensuring that communities were prepared. Under the programme Women wetem weta (Women's weather watch), members were supported to issue emergency warning messages on how to prepare for the cyclone, using text messages and a call-tree network that reached 40% of the population. Vano presented activities such as this to COP28.

In the aftermath of the cyclones, ActionAid's disability chapter, WITTT Sunshine, provided emergency relief, including food, dignity kits and other items to people with disabilities in Vanuatu's capital of Port Vila. WITTT members from the island of Malo, which had suffered only marginally, used their resilience gardens to provide fresh food for people on the worst affected islands. Nevertheless, Vano has noted that the ability to deal with endless climate challenges is dependent on receiving the funding necessary to scale up women-led disaster preparedness and climate resilience initiatives. She has explained that that is why she has attended the COPs in Sharm el-Sheikh, Dubai and Baku with the message that wealthy countries must take responsibility for the damage caused by their fossil fuel extraction and provide funding so that countries with minimal responsibility for climate changes can mitigate their impacts. She has also expressed her concern at the gender imbalance of the COPs and of the high numbers of lobbyists from fossil fuel companies who are always present.
