= Johan Hendrik Caspar Kern =

Dutch linguist and orientalist (1833–1917)

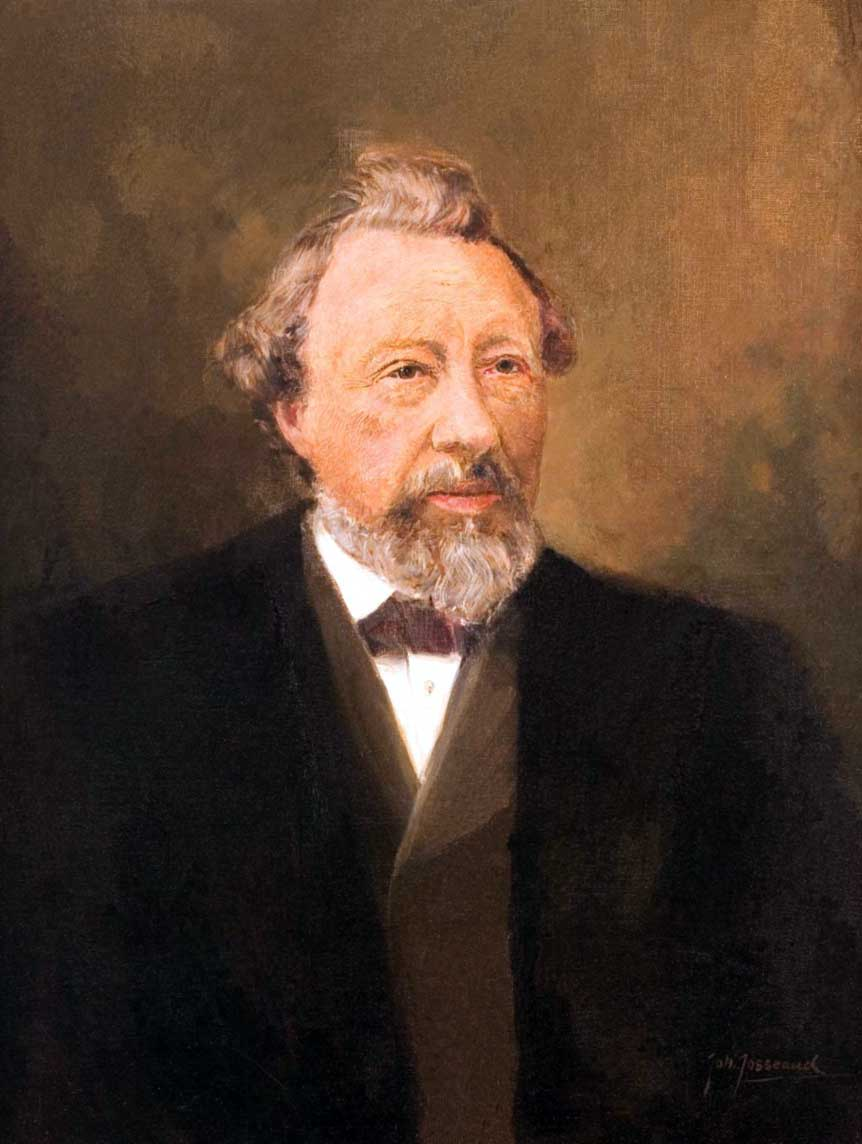
- Kern painted by Johannes Josseaud in Leiden
- Born: 6 April 1833; Purworejo, Dutch East Indies
- Died: 4 July 1917 (aged 84)
- Occupation: Professor

Academic background
- Education: Utrecht University; Leiden University
- Doctoral advisor: A. Rutgers

Academic work
- Discipline: Linguistics
- Institutions: University of Berlin; University of Maastricht; Banaras Hindu University; Queen's College, Benares; Leiden University

Johan Hendrik Caspar Kern (6 April 1833 – 4 July 1917) was a Dutch linguist and orientalist. In the literature, he is usually referred to as H. Kern or Hendrik Kern; a few other scholars bear the same surname.

== Life ==
Hendrik Kern was born to Dutch parents in the Central-Javanese town of Purworejo in the Dutch East Indies; however, when he was six, his family repatriated to the Netherlands. When he entered grammar school, he added the extra-curricular subjects of English and Italian to his studies.

In 1850, he went to Utrecht University to study Letters. In 1851, he moved to Leiden University to read Sanskrit with Professor A. Rutgers. After obtaining his Doctor's Degree in 1855, he moved to Berlin, where he continued his Sanskrit studies as a pupil of Albrecht Weber, and also took up Germanic and Slavonic languages.

On his return to the Netherlands in 1858, Kern accepted a post as a lecturer of Greek at Maastricht. In 1863, he was offered a Professorship in Benares, India where he taught Sanskrit at Brahmana and Queen's Colleges until 1865, when he was offered the Chair of Sanskrit at Leiden University. He remained there until his retirement in 1903, when he moved to the city of Utrecht. In 1866 he became member of the Royal Netherlands Academy of Arts and Sciences.

Kern continued work after his retirement. When his wife died in 1916, he was heart-broken and out-lived her by less than a year.

== Work ==
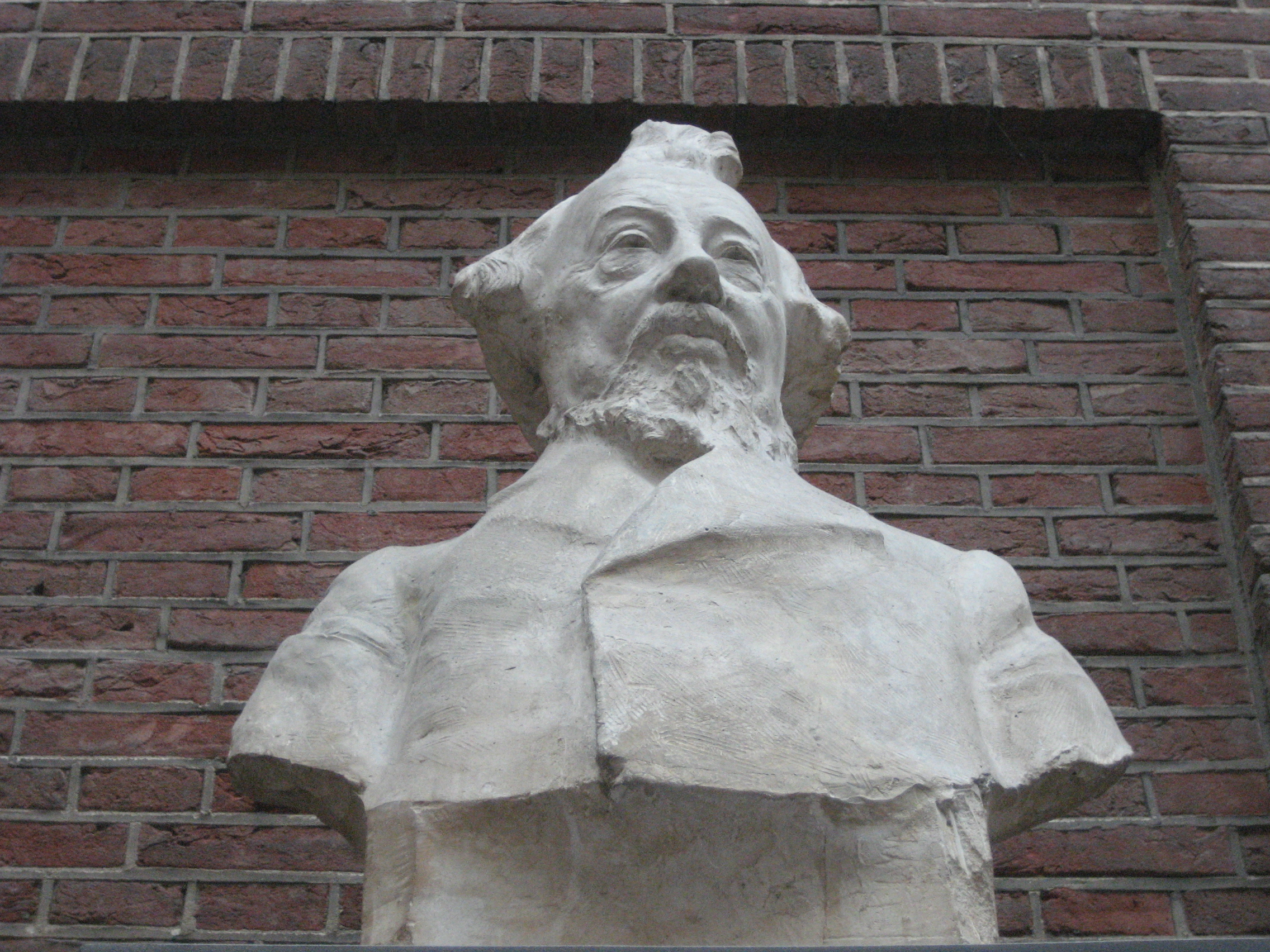
Bust Hendrik Kern by Charles van Wijk

Together with Herman Neubronner van der Tuuk, Kern is regarded as one of the founding fathers of Oriental Studies in the Netherlands. His interest in languages was great, as witness his decision to take up English and Italian while still a secondary school pupil. In addition, he displayed an extraordinary ability to study, and to master, a wide variety of languages.

At first, his studies were restricted to Indo-European languages, ranging from the Germanic sub-group to Sanskrit. His thesis, entitled Specimen historicum exhibens scriptores Graecos de rebus Persicis Achaemenidarum monumentis collatos (1855) broadened the field to Persian, showing that inscriptions in that language could be used to extend our knowledge of Ancient Persia. While in Benares, he applied himself to the study of Dravidian languages as well as picking up some Arabic and Hebrew, but also learnt sufficient Hungarian to be able to read novels in that non-Indo-European language within a year. His studies also included the Malay languages.

In 1874, he published an edition of the astronomer Āryabhata's work, thus putting out the first publication in Nagara script in the Netherlands.

Apart from promoting the study of Sanskrit, Kern laid the foundation for Austronesian studies by Dutch scholars. It is as a comparativist and a philologist that he gained his great reputation. In 1879 he worked on Cambodian inscriptions, then turned his attention to Kawi (or Old Javanese) and in 1886 showed that Fijian and Polynesian were cognate languages. He was the first scholar to propose that the Oceanic languages constituted a sub-group of Austronesian (or Malayo-Polynesian, as the language family was then called), and in 1906 he published a study of Aneityum and Erromanga, two languages in the Vanuatu branch of the Oceanic sub-group.

His interests were not restricted to pure linguistics. Thus, in 1889 he made use of the "Wörter und Sachen" method (which compares designations for plants, animals and objects in cognate languages) to ascertain a putative dispersal centre for the "Malayo-Polynesian" peoples.

Kern's versatility also showed itself in his cultural studies. His History of Buddhism in India (1881–83), displays a thorough command of its subject. However, the author has been criticised for an incomplete understanding of Eastern astrology and mysticism, which may in part have been due to his positivist approach. Kern has also been said to have borne a deep distrust of his contemporary Neogrammarians.

He published extensively, and his influence on subsequent linguists, both in the Netherlands and elsewhere, has been profound.

== Select bibliography ==
Kern's chief work is considered to be Geschiedenis van het Buddhisme in Indië (Haarlem, 2 vols., 1881–1883). In English he wrote a translation of the Saddharma Pundarika (Oxford, 1884, published as Vol. 21 of Max Müller's Sacred Books of the East); and a Manual of Indian Buddhism (Strassburg, 1896) for Buhler Kielhorn's Grundriss der indoarischen Philologie.

He also critically edited the Jataka-Mala of Arya Shura in the original Sanskrit [in Devanagari] which was published as volume 1 of the Harvard Oriental Series in 1891. A second issue came in 1914.

(With two exceptions, the following publications are in Dutch. The translation of a title in quotation marks indicates that no English translation of the work has come to notice.)

- Handleiding bij het onderwijs der Nederlandse taal

("A Guide to the Teaching of Dutch")
two vols, Zutphen, 1859–60, numerous reprints.

- Korte Nederlandse Spraakkunst

("A Concise Dutch Grammar")
Haarlem, 1872.

- Over de schrijfwijze van eenige zamenst. in het Nederlands

("On the Spelling of Some Compounds in Dutch")
Utrecht, 1858.

- Çakuntalā of het herkenningsteeken, Ind. tnsp. van Kālidāsa

("Çacuntalā or the Mark of Recognition: Kālidāsa's Indian Play")
Haarlem, 1862.

- Over het aandeel van Indië en de geschiedenis van de Beschaving, en den invloed der studie van het Sanskrit op de taalwetenschap

("On the Share of India and the History of Civilisation, and the Influence of the Study of Sanskrit on Linguistics")
Leiden, 1865.

- Die Glossen in der Lex Salica und die Sprache der Salischen Franken

("The Glosses in the Salic Law and the Language of the Salic Franks" [written in German])
The Hague, 1869.

- Over de jaartelling der Zdl. Buddhisten

("Concerning the Chronology of the Southern Buddhists")
a publication of the Koninklijke Nederlandse Akademie van Wetenschappen (Royal Netherlands Academy of Arts and Sciences), 1874.

- Wŗttasançaya, Oud-Javaans leerdicht over versbouw, tekst en vert.

("Wŗttasançaya, an Old-Javanese Didactic Poem on Metrical Construction": Text and Translation)
Leiden, 1875.

- Eene Indische sage in Javaansch gewaad

("An Indian Legend in Javanese Guise")
a publication of the Koninklijke Nederlandse Akademie van Wetenschappen (Royal Netherlands Academy of Arts and Sciences), 1876.

- Over de oudjavaanse vertaling van 't Mahābhārata

("On the Old-Javanese Translation of the Mahābhārata)
a publication of the Koninklijke Nederlandse Akademie van Wetenschappen (Royal Netherlands Academy of Arts and Sciences), 1877.

- Geschiedenis van het Buddhisme in Indië

("A History of Buddhism in India")
two vols, Haarlem, 1881–83. [Considered to be Kern's chief work.]

- Over den invloed der Indische, Arabische en Europese beschaving op de volken van den Indische Archipel

("On the Influence of the Indian, Arab and European Civilisations on the Peoples of the Indonesian Archipelago")
Leiden, 1883.

- Saddharma-Pundarîka, or, the Lotus of the True Law

(First English translation of Lotus Sutra)
Oxford, 1884.

- Verklaring van eenige woorden in Pali-geschriften

("An Explanation of Some Words in Pali Writings")
a publication of the Koninklijke Nederlandse Akademie van Wetenschappen (Royal Netherlands Academy of Arts and Sciences), 1886.

- De Fidji-taal vergeleken met hare verwanten in Indonesië en Polynesië

("The Fiji Language As Compared to Its Cognates in Indonesia and Polynesia")
Amsterdam, 1886.

- Tekstuitgave van het Oud-Javaanse heldendicht Rāmāyana

("A Text Edition of the Old-Javanese Rāmāyana Epic")
The Hague, 1900.

- De legende van Kunjarakarna

("The Legend of Kunjarakarna")
Amsterdam, 1901.

- Taalvergelijkende verhandeling over het Aneityumsch, met een Aanhangsel over het Klankstelsel van het Eromanga [sic]

("A Comparative Treatise of Aneityum: With an Appendix on the Sound System of Erromanga")
Amsterdam, 1906.

- Hendrik Kern, Verspreide Geschriften, 's-Gravenhage, M. Nijhoff, 15 v., 1913–28.
- Numerous contributions to Bijdragen tot de Taal-, Land- en Volkenkunde and other learned journals.
