= Whitesand =

Whitesand, or Whitesands or White Sand may refer to:

== Places ==
- Whitesand Bay, a beach in Cornwall, England, UK
- Whitesands Bay (Pembrokeshire), a beach in Wales, UK
- Whitesands, village on the island of Tanna in Vanuatu

=== Canada ===
- Whitesand, Ontario, First Nations reserve in Thunder Bay District, Ontario
- Whitesand Lake (Hewitson River), in Thunder Bay District, Ontario
- Whitesand River (Hewitson River), Ontario
- Whitesand River (Lake Nipigon), Ontario
- North Whitesand Lake, in Thunder Bay District, Ontario
- Whitesand River (Saskatchewan), a river in Saskatchewan
- Whitesand Dam, a dam in Saskatchewan on the Reindeer River

== Other uses ==
- Whitesand First Nation, an Ojibwe First Nation in northwestern Ontario, Canada
- Whitesands language, spoken on the eastern coast of Tanna Island in Vanuatu
- HMS Whitesand Bay (K633), Bay-class anti-aircraft frigate of the British Royal Navy
- White Sand (graphic novel), a fantasy graphic novel by Brandon Sanderson, Julius Gopez and Rik Hoskin
- "White Sand", song by Boss Hog from Boss Hog (album)
- "White Sand", song by Migos from Culture II
- "White Sand", song by Armin van Buuren from A State of Trance 2006

== See also ==
- White Sands (disambiguation)
