= Lenakel =

- Town
- Location in Vanuatu
- Coordinates: 19°32′S 169°16′E
- Country: Vanuatu
- Province: Tafea Province
- Island: Tanna
- Time zone: UTC+11 (VUT)

Lenakel is the largest town on the island of Tanna in Vanuatu. It has a population of 1,473.

It is located on the west coast of the island near the administrative capital of Isangel and serves as a major port of entry.

== Language ==
It is the center of the Lenakel language, one of the five Tanna languages native to the island; Vanuatu's official tongue, the English creole Bislama is spoken as well.

== Climate ==
Climate data for Lenakel (1998–2008)
Month	Jan	Feb	Mar	Apr	May	Jun	Jul	Aug	Sep	Oct	Nov	Dec	Year
Mean daily maximum °C (°F)	30.4 (86.7)	30.7 (87.3)	30.4 (86.7)	29.2 (84.6)	27.8 (82.0)	26.7 (80.1)	25.4 (77.7)	25.4 (77.7)	26.7 (80.1)	27.4 (81.3)	28.7 (83.7)	29.8 (85.6)	28.2 (82.8)
Mean daily minimum °C (°F)	22.9 (73.2)	23.3 (73.9)	23.2 (73.8)	22.2 (72.0)	20.6 (69.1)	19.1 (66.4)	18.0 (64.4)	17.8 (64.0)	18.6 (65.5)	19.1 (66.4)	20.4 (68.7)	21.4 (70.5)	20.6 (69.0)
Average rainfall mm (inches)	175.8 (6.92)	184.9 (7.28)	209.7 (8.26)	175.5 (6.91)	81.3 (3.20)	72.2 (2.84)	59.3 (2.33)	50.8 (2.00)	51.2 (2.02)	55.4 (2.18)	64.8 (2.55)	76.7 (3.02)	1,257.6 (49.51)
Average rainy days (≥ 0.2 mm)	15	14	16	14	11	9	9	9	9	9	7	8	130
Source: World Meteorological Organization
