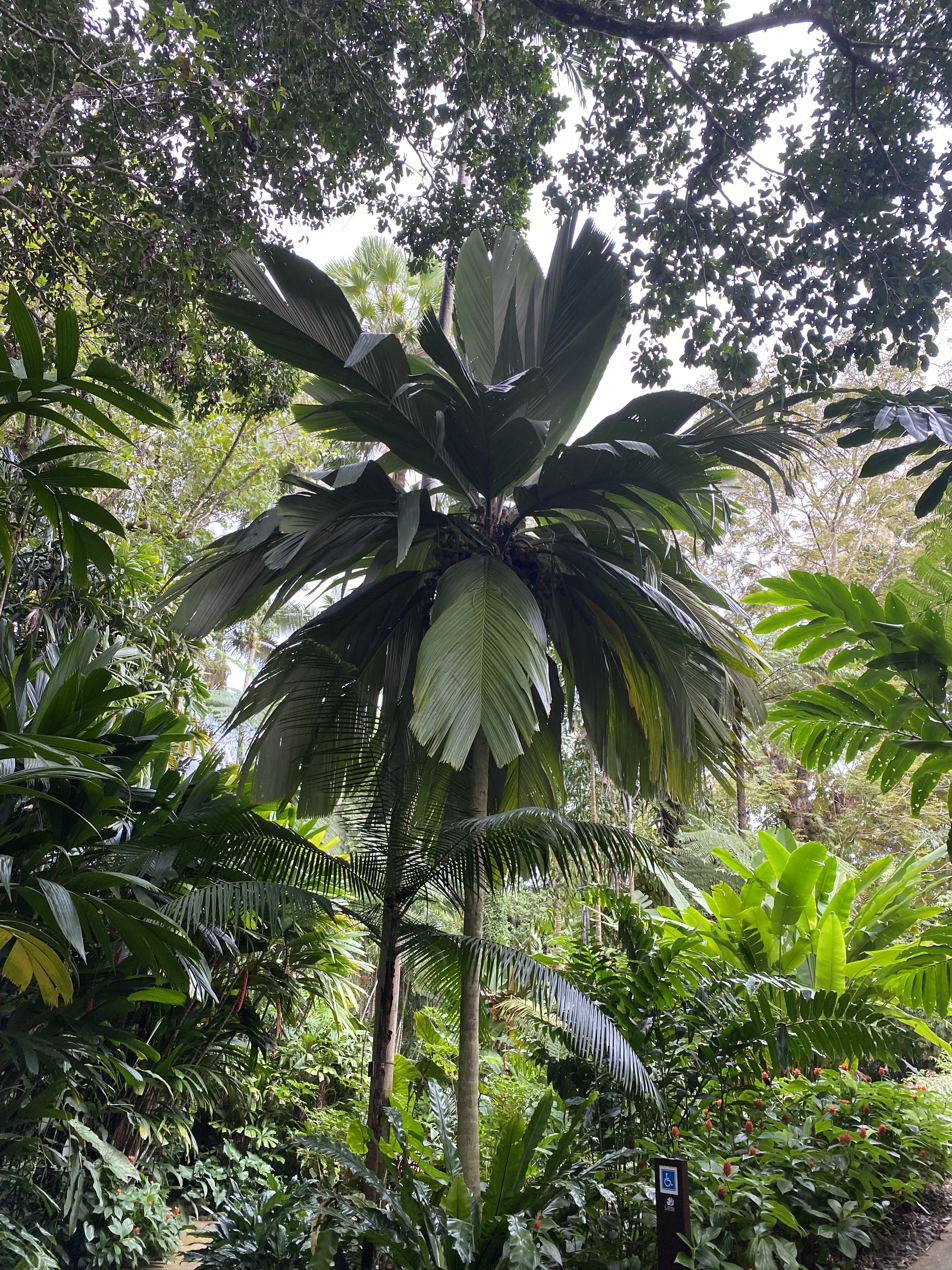

Scientific classification
- Kingdom: Plantae
- Clade: Tracheophytes
- Clade: Angiosperms
- Clade: Monocots
- Clade: Commelinids
- Order: Arecales
- Family: Arecaceae
- Genus: Pelagodoxa
- Species: P. mesocarpa

Binomial name
- Pelagodoxa mesocarpa Burret (1928)

= Pelagodoxa mesocarpa =

Species of palm tree

Pelagodoxa mesocarpa is a species of palm tree. It is endemic to Vanuatu, where it native to the Banks Islands, Erromango, and southwestern Malakula. It has been introduced to the Solomon Islands.

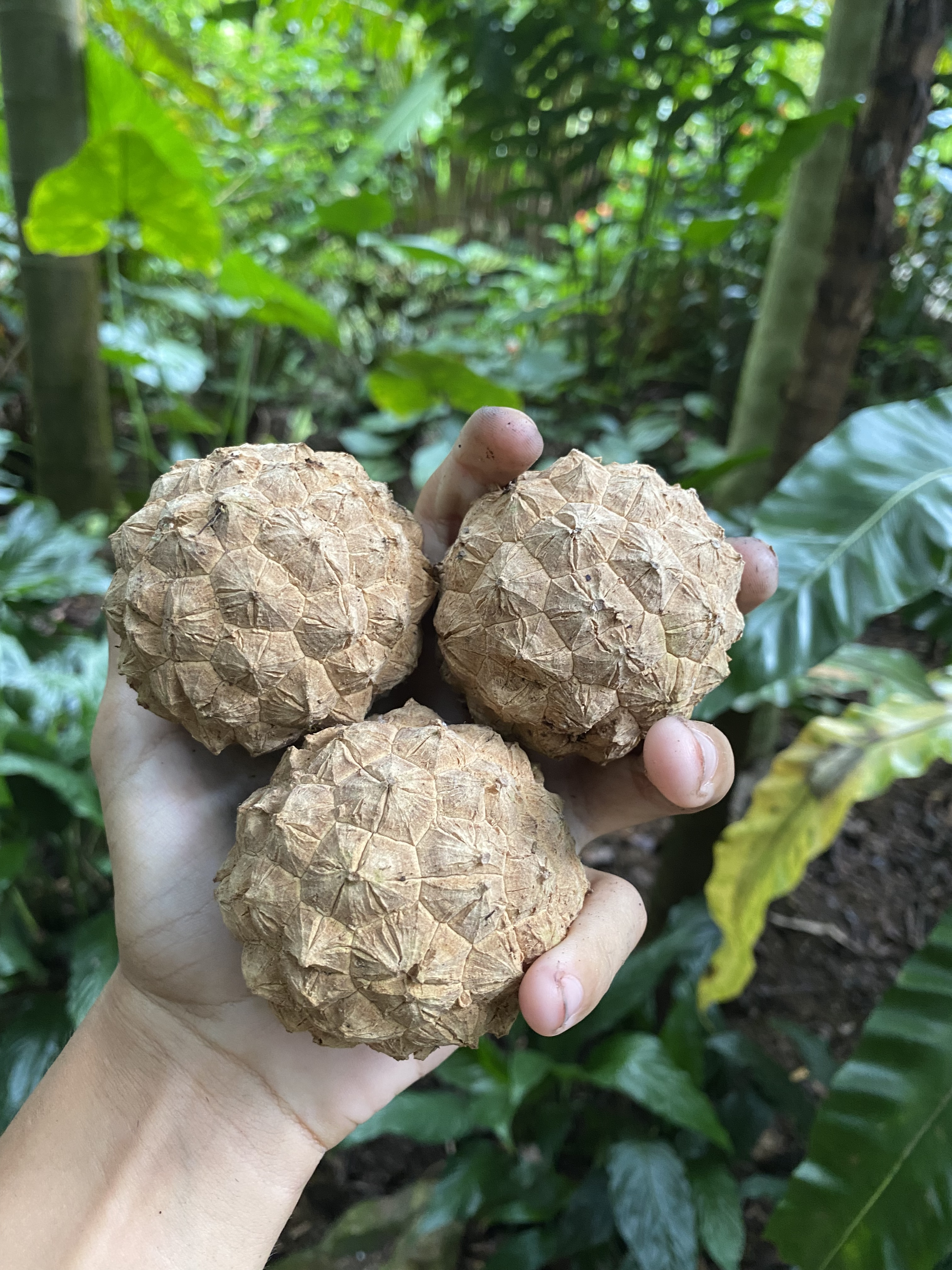
Ripe P. mesocarpa fruit
