= Lenakel language =

Austronesian language spoken in Vanuatu

Lenakel
- West Tanna
- Netvaar
- Native to: Vanuatu
- Region: Tanna Island
- Native speakers: (12,000 cited 2001)
- Language family: Austronesian: Malayo-Polynesian; Oceanic; Southern Oceanic; South Vanuatu; Tanna; Lenakel

Language codes
- ISO 639-3: tnl
- Glottolog: lena1238
- Lenakel is not endangered according to the classification system of the UNESCO Atlas of the World's Languages in Danger

Lenakel, or West Tanna, is a dialect chain spoken on the western coast of Tanna Island in Vanuatu.

Lenakel is one of five languages spoken on Tanna. The native name for the language is Netvaar, and speakers refer to their language as Nakaraan taha Lenakel 'the language of Lenakel'. Lenakel has been extensively researched and documented by John Lynch, and both a dictionary and a detailed linguistic description of the language have been published.

== Classification ==
Lenakel is an Austronesian language of southern Vanuatu. Its closest relatives are the other four Tanna languages spoken on the island of Tanna. It is particularly closely related to the Whitesands language and North Tanna, the two languages closest in geographic space to the Lenakel language area. Although none of the languages of Tanna are strictly mutually intelligible, there is a high degree of lexical overlap, and the grammars of Lenakel, Whitesands, and North Tanna are nearly identical. Based on Swadesh list data, Lenakel was found to be 73-80% lexically identical to North Tanna and 75-81% lexically identical to Whitesands. Linguist D.T. Tryon has referred to the linguistic situation in Vanuatu as one of "language-chaining," a reference to Dialect continuum, the idea within linguistics that dialects exist along a continuum or chain within a language area.

== Geographic distribution ==
Lenakel is spoken on Tanna, an island in the southern part of the 82-island chain comprising Vanuatu. It is spoken by between 8,500 and 11,500 people and is concentrated in the central west part of the island. Isangel, the administrative capital of Tafea Province, exists within the Lenakel language area, as does Lenakel, the largest city on the island of Tanna. There are significant Lenakel-speaking communities in other areas of Vanuatu, such as New Caledonia and Port Vila on the island of Efate.

=== Dialects ===
The dialect situation within Lenakel is complicated by the fact that native speakers of the language have differing opinions on whether or not closely related languages such as Whitesands and North Tanna are actually separate languages or whether they are dialects of Lenakel. Linguists such as John Lynch and Terry Crowley have suggested that further research is needed in order to more firmly establish dialect and language boundaries on Tanna.

The most reliable information to date suggests that there are up to ten dialects of Lenakel, including Loanatit, Nerauya, Itonga, and Ikyoo.

Lenakel is considered the most prestigious language spoken on Tanna, partially because it has been in use as a church language for over a century.

== Phonology ==
The phonemic inventory is as follows:

=== Consonants ===
| | Labio-velar | Labial | Alveolar | Palatal | Velar | Glottal |
|---|---|---|---|---|---|---|
| Nasal | mʷ ⟨m̃⟩ | m ⟨m⟩ | n ⟨n⟩ | | ŋ ⟨ŋ⟩ | |
| Plosive | pʷ ⟨p̃⟩ | p ⟨p⟩ | t ⟨t⟩ | | k ⟨k⟩ | |
| Fricative | | f ⟨f⟩ | s ⟨s⟩ | | | h ⟨h⟩ |
| Tap | | | ɾ ⟨r⟩ | | | |
| Approximant | w ⟨w⟩ | | l ⟨l⟩ | j̈ ⟨v⟩ | | |

- When followed by an /h/, sonorant sounds /mʷ m n ŋ l ɾ/ are heard phonetically as voiceless [m̥ʷ m̥ n̥ ŋ̊ l̥ ɾ̥~r̥].
- /ɾ/ is mostly a flap sound, in word-final position, it is heard as a trill sound [r].
- ⟨v⟩ is noted as a high central glide sound, phonetically noted as [j̈] or [ɨ̯].
- /t/ can become palatalized [tʲ] when occurring before /i/. It may also sound voiced in different positions as [dʲ].
- /k/ can become a voiced stop [ɡ] or fricative [ɣ] when in intervocalic positions.
- /t k/ can become aspirated [tʰ kʰ] before /h/. /p k/ when heard before an /h/ can have allophones as [ɸ x].
- A word-final /s/, can freely vary, being heard as [h].

=== Vowels ===
| | Front | Central | Back |
|---|---|---|---|
| Close | i ⟨i⟩ | | u ⟨u⟩ |
| Mid | e ⟨e⟩ | ə ⟨ə⟩ | o ⟨o⟩ |
| Open | | a ⟨a⟩ | |

- /i/ and /u/ become glide sounds [j] and [w] when adjacent to vowels.
- In closed syllables, /i/ and /u/ can be heard as [ɪ] and [ʊ].
- /e/ and /o/ are heard as [ɛ] and [ɔ] before a consonant. When occurring before a vowel or in word-final position, they are heard phonemically.
- /ə/ is heard as high as [ɨ] when occurring after alveolar consonants.
- After a labialized bilabial consonant, /a/ is heard as [ɒ]. When occurring after /j̈/, it is fronted as [a].
