= White Sands =

White Sands may refer to:

- White Sands, New Mexico, United States, residential area and national park of the White Sands Missile Range
- White Sands Missile Range, formerly the White Sands Proving Ground, a military installation in New Mexico hosting:
  - White Sands Test Center, operated by the United States Army
  - White Sands Test Facility, operated by NASA, and including:
    - White Sands Space Harbor
- White Sands National Park, desert of white sand dunes in New Mexico, US
- Whitesands, a town in Vanuatu
- White Sands Shopping Mall, Singapore, in Pasir Ris, Singapore
- White Sands, Alberta, Canada, a summer village in Stettler County
- White Sands (film), a 1992 Warner Bros. motion picture directed by Roger Donaldson
- White Sands: Experiences from the Outside World
- USS White Sands (ARD-20), a floating dry dock for the US Navy

== See also ==
- Whitesand (disambiguation)
