= Southwest Tanna language =

Austronesian language spoken in Vanuatu

Southwest Tanna
- Nawal
- Native to: Vanuatu
- Region: Tanna Island
- Native speakers: 4,500 (2011)
- Language family: Austronesian: Malayo-Polynesian; Oceanic; Southern Oceanic; South Vanuatu; Tanna; Southwest Tanna

Language codes
- ISO 639-3: nwi
- Glottolog: sout2869
- Southwest Tanna is not endangered according to the classification system of the UNESCO Atlas of the World's Languages in Danger

Southwest Tanna is a dialect chain spoken on the southwestern coast of Tanna Island in Vanuatu. Lynch (1982) names three major dialects: Nivhaal in the north-west of the language area (spelt "Nauvhal" in publicity for the 2015 film Tanna), Nivai in the south-west, and Nelpwaai in the north-east.
