= Mount Tukosmera =

Mountain on Tanna, Vanuatu

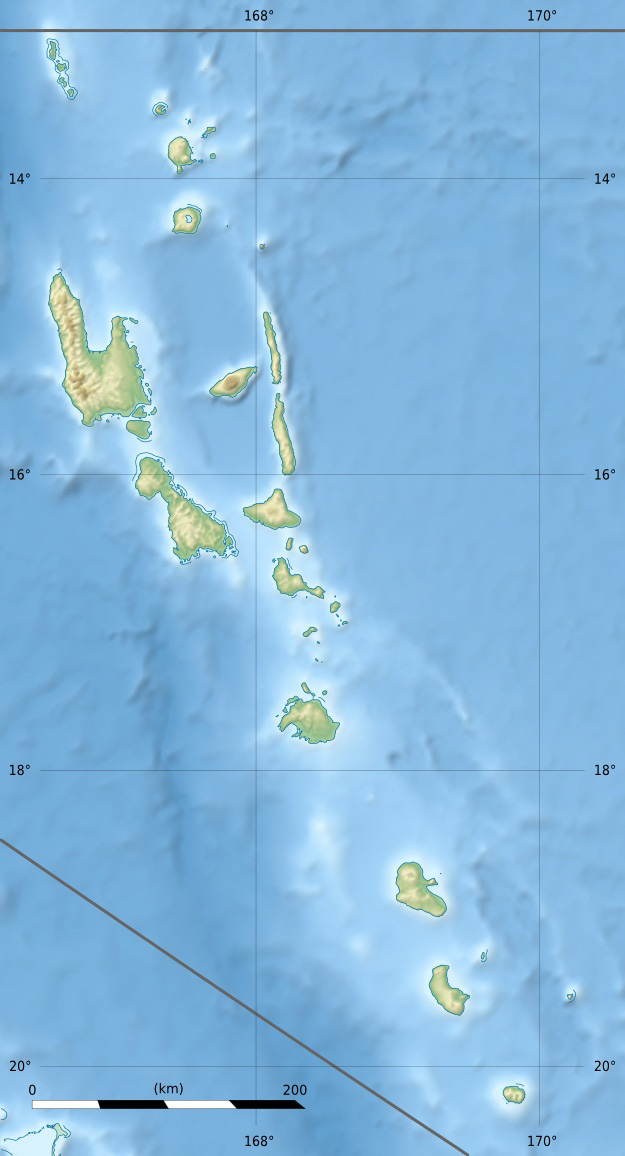
- Location within Vanuatu

Highest point
- Elevation: 1,084 m (3,556 ft)
- Prominence: 1,084 m (3,556 ft)
- Listing: Ribu
- Coordinates: 19°34′35″S 169°23′33″E

Geography
- Location: Tanna, Vanuatu

Geology
- Rock age: Pleistocene

Mount Tukosmera is the tallest mountain on Tanna, Vanuatu. It is located in the southern part of the island. It was a volcano in the Pleistocene, but is no longer active, unlike Mount Yasur. The mountain has special religious significance for the adherents of the John Frum movement, as a place from which gods come.

== Important Bird Area ==
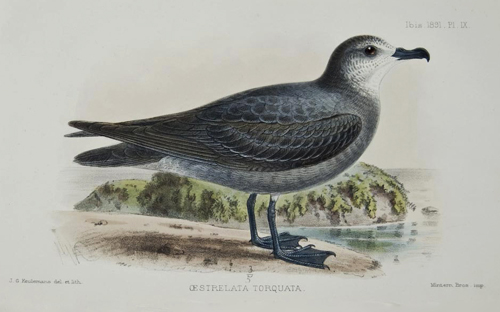
Collared petrels breed on the mountain

A 6,000-hectare (15,000-acre) tract of the upper slopes of the mountain has been recognised as an Important Bird Area (IBA) by BirdLife International because it contains a breeding site for a population of collared petrels.
