= Sorung language =

Extinct language formerly spoken in Vanuatu

Sorung
- Native to: Vanuatu
- Region: Erromango
- Extinct: (date missing)
- Language family: Austronesian: Malayo-Polynesian; Oceanic; Southern Oceanic; South Vanuatu; Erromangan; Sorung

Language codes
- ISO 639-3: None (mis)
- Linguist List: erg-erg (perhaps intended for Sie proper)
- Glottolog: None

Sorung is an extinct language of the island Erromango in Vanuatu. It has sometimes been classified as a dialect of Sie.
