= Echo subject =

English verb

An echo subject is a verb that has the same subject as the preceding verb. In some languages, such as Erromangan, it is commonly marked with a special reduced set of prefixes which replace the full set of subject prefixes.
