= Kwamera language =

Austronesian language spoken in Vanuatu

Kwamera
- South Tanna
- Nafe, Nɨfe
- Native to: Vanuatu
- Region: Tanna Island
- Native speakers: (3,500 cited 2001)
- Language family: Austronesian: Malayo-Polynesian; Oceanic; Southern Oceanic; South Vanuatu; Tanna; Kwamera

Language codes
- ISO 639-3: tnk
- Glottolog: kwam1252

Kwamera, or South Tanna [ntk], the endonym being Nafe (Nɨfe), is an Oceanic language, spoken on the southeastern coast of Tanna Island in Vanuatu, by about 3,500 people.

== Writing system ==
Kwamera alphabet
Majuscules	A	E	F	Fw	G	H	I	Ɨ	K	Kw	M	Mw	N	O	P	Pw	R	S	T	U	V
Minuscules	a	e	f	fw	g	h	i	ɨ	k	kw	m	mw	n	o	p	pw	r	s	t	u	v

== Resources ==
The Nafe (Kwamera) Talking Dictionary, hosted at Swarthmore College, includes 3,233 entries, 3,212 audio files, 1,236 images, and video clips.

== Bibliography ==
- Balick MJ, Ramík DM, Ramík N, Nemisa Kumas IK, Plunkett GM, Kelso N, Dovo P, Harrison KD. (2024) "The children of the Sun and Moon are the gardens"—How people, plants, and a living Sun shape life on Tanna, Vanuatu. PLoS ONE 19(11): e0313997.
- Lindstrom, Lamont (1986). Kwamera Dictionary. Department of Linguistics, Research School of Pacific Studies, Australian National University. ISBN 978-0-85883-340-1.
- K. David Harrison & Martial Wahe, 2015–2020. Nafe (Kwamera) Talking Dictionary. Swarthmore College.
