= Utaha language =

Extinct language from Vanuatu

Utaha
- Ifo
- Native to: Vanuatu
- Region: Erromango
- Extinct: 1954, with the death of James Nalig
- Language family: Austronesian: Malayo-Polynesian; Oceanic; Southern Oceanic; South Vanuatu; Erromangan; Utaha

Language codes
- ISO 639-3: iff
- Glottolog: ifoo1237
- Ifo is classified as Extinct by the UNESCO Atlas of the World's Languages in Danger.

Utaha, also known as Ifo, is an extinct language of the island Erromango in Vanuatu.
