= Whitesands =

- Village
- Location in Vanuatu
- Coordinates: 19°30′27″S 169°26′59″E
- Country: Vanuatu
- Province: Tafea Province
- Island: Tanna
- Time zone: UTC+11 (VUT)

Whitesands or White Sands is a village on the island of Tanna in Vanuatu.

Located on the southeast side of the island near Sulphur Bay, the area is a center of the indigenous Whitesands language and the John Frum cargo cult.

There is a store.
