= Morphotactics =

Morpheme ordering restrictions

Morphotactics represent the ordering restrictions in place on the ordering of morphemes. Etymologically, it can be translated as "the set of rules that define how morphemes (morpho) can touch (tactics) each other".

== Example of a morphotactic rule ==
Many English affixes may only be attached directly to morphemes with particular parts of speech:

- do + -able + -ity = doability

but not

- do + -ity + -able = *doityable

The suffix -ity produces a noun from an adjective, and -able creates adjectives from verbs. To reverse the order violates the rules of English morphotactics, making the word ungrammatical (marked with an asterisk).

== Common morphotactic model ==
The finite-state machine and the graph are the two models which are often used as a set of rules for morphotactics.
