= Isangel =

- Town
- Location in Vanuatu
- Coordinates: 19°31′48″S 169°16′48″E
- Country: Vanuatu
- Province: Tafea Province
- Island: Tanna

Population (2009)
  - Total: 1,200
- Time zone: UTC+11 (VUT)

Isangel is a town in Vanuatu.

Located on the island of Tanna, it is the provincial administrative capital of Tafea Province.

== Population ==
The town has a population of about 1,200, most of them Melanesians; the major languages of the area are Lenakel language, and the national tongue Bislama, an English creole.

== Geology ==
The island of Tanna is located in the Ring of Fire, a tectonic belt with frequent earthquakes, which circumscribes the Pacific Ocean. The last earthquake near Isangel of magnitude 7.1 was registered on December 7, 2023.
