= Aneityum language =

Austronesian language spoken in Vanuatu

Anejom̃
- Pronunciation: [anetʃomʷ]
- Native to: Vanuatu
- Region: Aneityum Island
- Native speakers: (900 cited 2001)
- Language family: Austronesian: Malayo-Polynesian; Oceanic; Southern Oceanic; South Vanuatu; Anejom̃

Language codes
- ISO 639-3: aty
- Glottolog: anei1239
- ELP: Anejom̃
- Aneityum is not endangered according to the classification system of the UNESCO Atlas of the World's Languages in Danger

Aneityum or Anejom̃ (also spelled Anejom, and formerly Aneiteum, Aneityumese) is an Oceanic language spoken by 900 people (as of 2001) on Aneityum Island, Vanuatu. It is the only indigenous language of Aneityum.

== Names ==
The alternate names for Aneityum are Anejom̃, Anejom, Aneiteum, Aneiteumese, Aneytum and Annatom.

== Classification ==
Anejom̃ is part of the Austronesian language family, and is part of the large subgroup of Oceanic languages. Anejom̃ falls under the Southern Oceanic Languages subgroup, and more specifically Southern Vanuatuan Languages. It constitutes its own separate branch of Southern Vanuatuan languages. While Anejom̃ is now considered to be only one language, some historical reports have suggested that Anejom̃ might have consisted of two very distinct dialects. Its closest relatives are preliminarily thought to be more closely related to the languages of Tanna (e.g. Kwamera, South-West Tanna, Lenakel) than Erromango languages.

== Geography ==
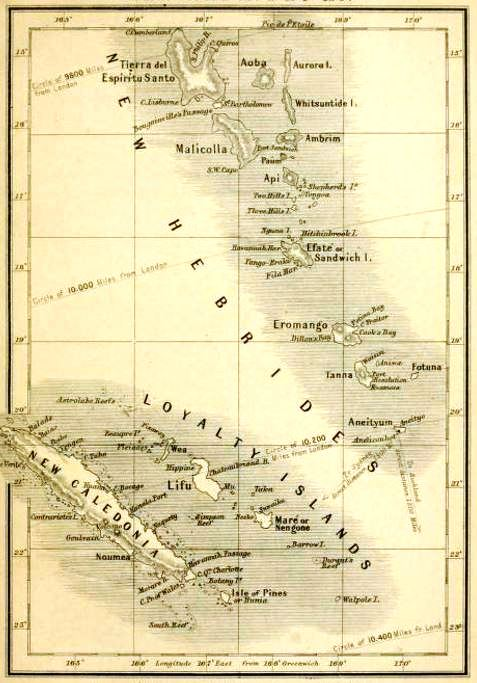
Map of Vanuatu (Formerly known as the New Hebrides)

The island of Aneityum is the southernmost inhabited island of the nation of Vanuatu. It is closest to the islands of Tanna and Futuna. The island's geographic location made Anejom̃ develop in isolation. The first speakers of the language are believed to have lived on hillsides near coasts in order to access resources. However, due to land degradation and population pressure, the speakers moved to the valleys.

== History ==
Aneityum is thought to have been settled around 874 BCE ± 60 years by people coming over from Tanna. Original settlers (and speakers of the language) are thought to have lived on hillsides near the coasts in order to access resources from the ocean and land. However, the combination of land degradation and population forced the Aneityumese to move onto valley flats instead.

The original political system was like much of Melanesia; it was composed of multiple chiefs (natimarid) ruling over many chiefdoms (neclau). According to oral tradition, the island had two chiefdoms but they split to then form seven chiefdoms each "further divided into a number of districts between fifty and sixty in number".

The first contact with Europeans was in 1830, when the brig Alpha landed in Aneityum with hopes of establishing a sandalwood trading business.

The population of the Aneityumese has greatly declined over the years (along with the number of speakers); however, the population has seen a bit of a resurgence in the present. Most of the population was decimated by two major epidemics in the 1830s and 1840s and never fully recovered as can be seen below:

Aneityum population
Pre-Contact	9,000-20,000	1905	435
1830	4,600-5,800	1917	320
1854	3,800	1926	220
1865	2,100	1936	193
1878	1,279	1947	191
1886	930	1957	244
1897	527	1967	313

=== Church presence ===
Like much of the rest of Melanesia, the church has played an important role in language ideology on Aneityum. The first missionaries to land on the island were Samoan Presbyterians who arrived in 1841. After them followed European Presbyterian missionaries who established themselves in 1848. With the large missionary presence on the island, many schools were founded to spread the message of Christianity. In these schools, the classroom was mainly conducted in Anejom̃, however numeracy was conducted in English. The missionary presence on the island was so prevalent that the island was considered the "first successfully missionized island in Melanesia" and housed the headquarters of the Presbyterian Mission to the New Hebrides.

The missions on Aneityum promoted the use of English.

=== Colonialization ===
Vanuatu came under joint British and French rule in 1887, which then became formalized in 1906 where Vanuatu became known as the "Anglo-French Condominium". Colonialization along with the big mission presence on the island led to the languages of French and English to become prestige languages. Other languages of Vanuatu also became prestigious (such as Nguna) because these language were chosen by missionaries to spread their teachings. With prolonged contact with English speakers, another language also arose: Bislama. Bislama, a pidgin of English, is now an extremely widely used language and has had a huge role in language change within Anejom̃.

== Phonology and orthography ==
=== Phonemes ===
Anejom̃ has 5 vowels and 20 or 21 consonants. The sound [ʔ] is sometimes counted as phoneme.

Anejom̃ Consonants
	Labial-Velar	Labial	Dental	Alveolar	Palatal	Velar	Glottal
Plosive	pʷ	p		t		k	(ʔ)
Affricate					tʃ		
Nasal	mʷ	m		n	ɲ	ŋ	
Fricative		f v	θ	s		ɣ	h
Tap				ɾ			
Lateral				l			
Semivowel	w				j		

Vowel and consonant length is contrastive in this language and is shown in orthography by writing the vowel or consonant twice.

Anejom̃ Vowels
	Front		Central		Back	
	short	long	short	long	short	long
High	ɪ	iː			ʊ	uː
Mid	ɛ	eː			ɔ	oː
Low			a	aː		

=== Orthography ===
Anejom̃ was never a written language and so traditionally did not have an orthography. The first orthography was made by the missionary John Inglis in 1882. It was considered to be a fairly good orthography of its time (having a one-to-one correspondence between letters and phonemes); however, it did contain several key problems.

1. It did not distinguish between /pʷ/ and /p/ and /mʷ/ and /m/.
2. The phoneme /ɲ/ was not always written as a separate letter from other nasal phonemes.
3. The allophone of /e/, [ə], was written confusingly as "eu".
4. Palatal off-glide before a palatal consonant was denoted as an "i".
5. Vowel and consonant length were not represented consistently in the orthography.

A new orthography more accepted by Anejom̃ speakers now is shown below.

Phoneme	Orthographic Representation	
Phoneme	Short	Long
pʷ	p̃	p̃p̃
p	p	pp
t	t	tt
k	k	kk
tʃ	j	jj
f	f	ff
θ	d	dd
s	s	ss
h	h	hh
v	v	vv
ɣ	c	cc
mʷ	m̃	m̃m̃
m	m	mm
n	n	nn
ɲ	ñ	ññ
ŋ	g	gg
l	l	ll
ɾ	r	rr
w	w	ww
j	y	yy
ɪ	i	ii
ɛ	e	ee
a	a	aa
ɔ	o	oo
ʊ	u	uu

=== Allophones ===
==== Glottal stop ====
The moderately phonemic glottal stop is an allophone of /h/ when it occurs before a consonant. It also occurs as an allophone before vowels that occur in the word initial position.

==== Nasals ====
The phoneme /ɲ/ becomes [j̃] after a high vowel.

==== Voicing ====
Stops and affricates in Anejom̃ change in voicing depending on where they occur between segments as described and illustrated below.

- Between vowels, labial stops become voiced. Other stops (and affricates) are partially voiced.
- Between voiced segments, all stops are variably voiced. The affricate /tʃ/ is variably voiced between voiced segments too. However, when it occurs before a nasal segment it becomes [c].
- When these stops occur word initially, they are always slightly aspirated. The affricate /tʃ/ on the other hand is not aspirated but often takes on variable voicing.
- When these stops and affricates don't occur between vowels or voiced segments they stay as their underlying form. For example, /p/ becomes [p] and /k/ becomes [k].
- When these stops occur in final position, the phonemes don't change. However, the affricate /tʃ/ becomes [c], but can also be heard as [tʃ] in free variation.

==== Liquids ====
- /ɾ/ can be heard as [r] in slower speech.

==== Vowels ====
- Vowel sounds are more tense when occurring as a long vowel.
- Single vowel sounds /ɪ ʊ/ occur as tense [i u] in word-final position.
- /e o/ occur as [e̝ o̝] when preceding a high vowel /i u/ of the same frontness or roundness.
- /i e/ occur as centralized [ɨ ə] before and after /ɣ/.
- /a/ very often assimilates before a following high vowel, becoming [æ] or [ɛ] before /i/, and [ɒ] or [ɔ] before /u/.

== Morphology ==
=== Pronouns ===
There are three types of pronouns in Anejom̃: personal, demonstrative, and interrogative pronouns.

==== Personal pronouns ====
Anejom̃'s personal pronouns distinguish:

1. three persons, with a further distinction of inclusive and exclusive in first person non-singular
2. four numbers (singular, dual, trial, and plural)
3. three cases (focal, object, and possessive)"

===== Focal pronouns =====
Focal pronouns
		Singular	Dual	Trial	Plural
1st person	inclusive	---	akajau	akataj	akaja
1st person	exclusive	añak	ajamrau	ajamtaj	ajama
2nd person		aek*, aak	ajourau	ajoutaj	ajowa
3rd person		aen*, aan	aarau	aattaj	aara

*The focal pronouns aek and aen are only used in writing or when a speaker speaks slowly. Most of the time the pronouns aak and aan, respectively, are used instead (and are generally pronounced with short vowels instead of long vowels). Below is an example of a focal pronoun.

Et amjeg aan*
3SG.AOR sleep (s)he
'He/she/it is sleeping.'

===== Object pronouns =====
Object pronouns
		Singular	Dual	Trial	Plural
1st person	inclusive	---	cajau	cataj	caja
1st person	exclusive	ñak	camrau	camtaj	cama
2nd person		yic**, -c	courau	coutaj	cowa
3rd person		yin**, -n	rau	ettaj	ra

Object pronouns are free morphemes and occur after verbs and certain "case-marking prepositions" as seen below.

Arodei ra aak!
whip them.PL you.SG
'Whip them!'

**The 2SG and 3SG object pronouns normally occur as yic and yin, however when a vowel precedes these pronouns then they change to the suffixes -c and -n respectively.

*Et emtita-i yic aan. → Et emitita-c aan.
3SG.AOR fear-TR you.SG.O (s)he → 3SG.AOR fear-2SG.O (s)he
'He's frightened of you'

===== Possessive pronouns =====
Possessive pronouns
		Singular	Dual	Trial	Plural
1st person	inclusive	---	-jau	-jau	-ja
1st person	exclusive	-k	-mrau	-mrau	-ma
2nd person		-m̃	-mirau	-mirau	-mia
3rd person		-n	-rau	-rau	-ra

Possessive pronouns occur as suffixes and can be attached to "directly possessed nouns and possessive markers, some case-markers, and to members of one sub-class of verbs". See below:

Alum̃a-k ti aak
give.to.drink-my tea you.SG
'Give me some tea (to drink).'

==== Interrogative pronouns ====
There are two interrogative pronouns in Anejom̃: di ('who') and panid and its less widely used alternate, panida ('which').

Et adel a di?
3SG.AOR fart S who
'Who farted?'

However, 'di' is "inherently singular" and requires a coordinate phrase with im, as seen in the example here, to express plurality.

Era apam di im di?
3PL.AOR come who and who
'Who (PL) came?'

Panid and panida can only be used to refer to inanimate objects.

'Le naifi enai aak!'
take.SG knife DEM2.SG you.SG
'Get me that knife!'

'Panid?'
which.one
'Which one?'

==== Demonstrative pronouns ====
Demonstrative pronouns also have singular, dual, trial and plural forms like personal pronouns (see below).

Demonstrative pronouns
	Singular	Dual	Trial	Plural
Proximate	niñki nii, niñ	rañki raaki, raa	tijiraaki	jiñki jiijiñ, jii
Intermediate	naanai naa	rañka		jeknaa
Distant	naikou	rañkou		jeknaikou
Anaphoric	yiiki yii	raaki		jiiki [recent] jekeñ [distant]

In Anejom̃, demonstrative pronouns can also take the suffix -sak which denotes that the speaker is "pointing at or in some other way indicating the location of the thing referred to."

Alp̃a-i ñak jeknaa-sak aak.
give-TR me this2.PL-INDIC you.SG
'Give me those ones there (that I'm pointing at).'

=== Nouns ===
Anejom̃ has several categories for nouns: temporal, locative, personal, obligatorily possessed and optionally possessed nouns. The latter two categories (obligatorily possessed and optionally possessed nouns), are further distinguished based on animacy (as seen below).

Nouns	Temporal	
Nouns	Locative	
Nouns	Personal	
Nouns	Obligatorily possessed	Animate
Nouns	Obligatorily possessed	Inanimate
Nouns	Optionally possessed	Animate
Nouns	Optionally possessed	Inanimate

==== Temporal nouns ====
Examples of common temporal nouns can be seen below.

Temporal noun (Anejom̃)	English definition
kou	now
ituwu	nuhup̃an
ipiñ	today
imrañ	tomorrow
iyenev	yesterday
invid	two days from today (past or future)
hovid	three days from today (past or future)

==== Locative nouns ====
Locative nouns in Anejom̃ do not need the case marker "a" to occur in front of it as shown in the example below.

Et m̃an apan aan Isia
3SG.AOR PERF go (s)he Isia.
'He went to Isia.'

Locative nouns also include the following words:

Anejom̃	English
ijiñis	above
ijhou	outside
itohou	far inland
itac	behind
up̃os	on land, in a clear place

==== Personal nouns ====
Personal nouns include kinship terms as well as names of people.

==== Obligatorily possessed nouns ====
These nouns must "be marked as being possessed by some other noun or pronoun", which tends to be marked by suffixation. Most of the obligatorily possessed nouns are kinship terms.

An example of direct suffixation can be seen in the examples below.

etma-n
father-his/her
'his/her father'

etma-ra
father-their.PL
'their father'

There are some nouns that do not take direct suffixation but rather use possessive markers such as the word for "child", "nephew", "niece", and "sister," to name a few.

==== Optionally possessed nouns ====
Unlike obligatorily possessed nouns, these nouns do not, or do not have to, take possession markers.

===== Animate and inanimate Nouns =====
Anejom̃ has a distinction between animate and inanimate nouns which is further divided into obligatorily possessed and optionally possessed nouns.

Animate nouns are usually marked by using the subject marker "a" for singular and the prefix "elpu-" for plural.

Et alp̃as a pikad uñu-m̃.
3SG.AOR big S pig POSS.G-your.SG
'Your pig is (getting) big.'

Pluralization of the word meaning 'man' to 'men' seen below.

natam̃añ → elpu-atam̃añ

Inanimate nouns are not marked in either the singular or plural.

=== Noun prefixes ===
Anejom̃ has several key prefixes that serve important roles:

Prefix	Function	Example
n- / in- (-in is used before a consonant)	adding this prefix makes verbs into nouns	omrag (be old) → n-omrag (old person)
n- / in- (-in is used before a consonant)	also produces nominalized verbs	Nai meret aek n-apan va-ñ Vila ka a'o? 2SG.AOR want you.SG NMLZ-go PURP-TR Vila or no 'Do you want to go to Vila?'
*inta-	makes instrumental nouns from verbs	ahrei (to sleep) → inta-ahrei (broom)
nupu-	makes "human nouns from locative nouns or other locationally-oriented forms". (Human nouns are nouns that mean 'a person from that place'.)	Samoa (Samoa) → nupu-Samoa (a Samoan)
elpu-	plural form of nupu- (has the same function)	Samoa (Samoa) → elpu-Samoa (Samoans)
nef(e)-	signals importance or size	natimi (person) → nef-atimi (an important person)
nev(e)-	'which?'	nelcau (canoe) →nev-elcau (which canoe)

*Inta- is used sparingly compared to the other prefixes. Most of the time, instrumental nouns are compounds that include the word 'nitai', which is most likely where 'inta' comes from.

==== N-/in- Prefix ====
The n-/in- prefix is a frequently used as well as frequently occurring underlying morpheme: it accounts for around 85% of Anejom̃ nouns. The other approximate 15% of nouns that don't use this prefix tend to be highly specific groups of nouns.

==== Collective prefixes ====
Anejom̃ also has a different set of prefixes that are referred to as collective prefixes, as they refer to large groups of things:

Collective prefix	Meaning
niji-	"general collective prefix used with a wide variety of nouns"
nupu- (not the same nupu- prefix in the previous table)	used for humans and higher animates
inlel-	used for inanimates (most likely things that occur in nature)
inmal-	used for inanimate (most likely artefacts)

=== Noun suffixes ===
==== Direct possession ====
In Anejom̃, the possessive form of personal pronouns are attached directly to the noun when "the possessor is a personal pronoun".

nijma-k
hand-my
'my hand'

==== Indirect possession ====
For all other nouns that cannot be directly possessed, a "possessive or construct suffix is added to a possessive marker" as seen below.

intal inca-i di?
taro POSS.F-CS who
'whose taro?'

Possessive markers
inca-	possession of food
lum̃a	possession of drink
lida-	possession of "something to suck the juice from"
um̃a-	possession of a "customarily owned area of land or sea"
a, era-	passive or subordinate possession
u, uwu-	general possession

=== Verbs ===
Verbs in Anejom̃ are words that can occur as the head of a verb phrase. In Anejom̃, verbs are distinguished by transitivity; there are transitive, intransitive and (the family small class of) ambi-transitive verbs. Examples of these verbs can be seen below.

	Verb	Meaning
Transitive	ciñ, awod, alcajira-ñ, hag*	'eat', 'hit', 'tie up', 'eat' (TRANS)
Intransitive	aco, epehtau, amjeg, ciñ*	'forage for shellfish', 'to stumble/trip', 'to sleep', to eat (INTR)
Ambi-Transitive	atapanes, ataktai, asalgei	'shut, close', 'think, think about', 'open'

*Many transitive verbs also have intransitive pairings as can be seen by the two verbs that mean 'to eat' in the table above.

==== The verbs yek and isp̃a ====
Both of these verbs are unusual in that they do not follow the regular pattern.

===== Yek: to be at, be present =====
Yek is an existential verb that is different from the majority of Anejom̃ verbs in a number of ways.

1. The root of yek changes irregularly in the singular, dual and trial forms.
2. The verb does not take subject-tense markers, though it does take certain aspect-mood markers.
3. Pronoun subjects come after yek.
4. Noun phrases normally come before yek instead of after and don't take the subject marker a.
5. It has specific markers it can and cannot occur with.

===== Isp̃a =====
This verb marks the reflexive or reciprocal and takes an agreeing possessive suffix as seen below.

Et isp̃a-n edel aan.
3SG.AOR REFL-its grow it
'It grew by itself'.

==== Inflectional prefixes ====
Inflectional prefixes	Function
imy(i)-	comitative
er(i)-	mutual action/multiple subject
ec-	multiplicative (is used to show the number of times an action is performed).

The vowel (i) is only added if it occurs before a consonant.

==== Reduplication ====
Anejom̃ does have reduplication although it is not used very often. It most commonly occurs as complete reduplication as seen below.

Noun	Definition	Reduplication	Definition
erop̃	'slow'	erop̃-erop̃	'too/very slow'

==== Object suffixes for transitive verbs ====
Not including the verbs which take possessive suffixes, there are three main types of ways in which transitive verbs are marked. The types of verbs are: 1) unmarked verbs, 2) "verbs that take the transitive suffix "-i" with all objects", 3) verbs that only take "-i" with animate objects and "-ñ" with inanimate objects.

	Type 1 Verb	Type 2 Verb	Type 3 Verb
Animate object	-----	-i	-i
Inanimate object	------	-i	-ñ

==== Directional and locational verb suffixes ====
These suffixes attach to the end of the verb and will come after a transitive suffix if one occurs.

Direction/locational suffixes
Vertical		Horizontal		Distance	
-jai	up, south, east	-pam	hither, towards speaker/focus	-ki	near
-se(h)	down, north, west	-pan	thither, away from speaker/focus	-kou	distant
-se(h)	down, north, west	-p̃ok	seawards	-kou	distant
-se(h)	down, north, west	-pahai	landwards, inland	-kou	distant

Distance suffixes have to combine with horizontal or vertical suffixes; they cannot be alone. The ordering of these suffixes are as follows: 1) vertical, 2) horizontal, 3) distance.

==== Subject-tense marking ====
In a verb phrase, a subject marking morpheme tends to occur first (except if it is an imperative, optionally conjoined, or subordinate clause). In Anejom̃, subject-tense-aspect marking is undergoing radical change.

19th century subject-tense markers (Capell)
	Singular	Dual	Trial	Plural
Aorist (present, recent past, habitual)
1 INC		intau	intaj	inta
1 EXC	ek	ecrau	ektaj, ektij	ecra
2	na	ekau	ahtaj	eka
3	et	erau	ehtaj	era
Past
1 INC		intis	intijis	imjis
1 EXC	kis	ecrus	ektijis	ecris
2	as	akis	ahtijis	akis
3	is	erus	ehtijis	eris
Inceptive (event about/likely to happen)
1 INC		tu	tiji	ti
1 EXC	inki, ki	ecru	tiji	ecri
2	an	eru	tiji	aki
3	inyi, yi	eru	tiji	eri

There seems to be a lot of change in present day subject-tense marking, especially in the plural subject-tense marking category by younger speakers. Here are all the (competing) subject-tense markers used in modern Anejom̃.

Modern Anejom̃ subject-tense markings
	Singular	Dual	Trial	Plural
Aorist
1 INC		tau, ta, ekra, erau, era, rai-	taj, ta, ekra, era, rai-	ta, ekra, era, rai-
1 EXC	ek, k-	ekrau, ekra, erau, era, rai-	ettaj, ekra, era, rai-	ekra, era, rai-
2	na, nai, n-	erau, ekra, erau, era, rai-	ettaj, ekra, era, rai-	eka, ekra, era, eri, rai-
3	et, t-	erau, era, ekra, rai-	ettaj, ekra, era, rai-	era, eri, ekra, rai-
Past
1 INC		tus, tu, kis, is, s-	tijis, kis, is, s-	eris, kis, is, s-
1 EXC	kis, is, s-	eris, is, s-	eris, is, s-	ekris, eris, is, s-
2	as, na, is, s-	ekris, ekrus, arus, is, s-	atijis, ekris, is, s-	akis, ekris, is, s-
3	is, s-	erus, eris, ekris, is, s-	etijis, ekris, era, s-	eris, ekris, is, s-
Inceptive
1 INC		tu, ti, yi, ri	tiji, ti, ri	ti, ri
1 EXC	ki	ekru, ri	etiji, ekri, ri	ekri, ri
2	an, ni	aru, ra, ri	atiji, ra, ri	aki, ra, ri
3	iñiyi, inyi, yi, y-	eru, ru, ra, ri	etiji, eri, ra, ri, yi	eri, ra, ri

==== Mood, aspect, tense Markers ====
Anejom̃ has several markers (different from the subject-markers) which indicate a variety of mood, aspect and tense.

Mood, Aspect, Tense Markers
pu	definite future
mu	indefinite or polite future, hortative
p̃ar	sequential action or subsequent action
m̃an	perfective/completive
jim	prohibitive

=== Compounding ===
Compounding is a key historical and modern feature of Anejom̃; it has both compound nouns and compound verbs. (Note: pp. 105-111) Compound nouns generally consist of a noun followed by either a noun, verb, modifier or a possessive construction, and compound verbs tend to be a combination of two verbs, although sometimes a verb is followed by a noun. Compounding is so prevalent, that historical linguistics use modern (as well as fossilized compounds) to trace genealogical relationships between Oceanic languages. Another one of the key uses of compounding in Anejom̃ is that it is used to form the instrumental case. Examples of compounding can be seen below.

Compound Type	1st word	+	2nd Word	Compound	Meaning
Compound Nouns	nepjed (citurs)	+	eromaga (Erromango)	nepjed-eromaga	'mandarin orange'
Compound Nouns	nadiat (day)	+	atum̃ap (rest)	nadiat atum̃ap	'Sunday'
Verb Compounds	ama-i (chew TR)	+	alde-i (cut TR)	amalde-i	'bite one's tongue'
Fossilized Compounds	Presumed First word ahvii (press with finger)	+	Presumed second word am̃od (to break)	Now a word ahvam̃od	'break by squeezing'

== Syntax ==
Anejom̃ word order is fairly strict and does not allow for much variation. The preferred word order in Anejom̃ is VOS (or verb, followed by object, then subject). This word order is extremely unusual within the languages of Vanuatu and makes Anejom̃ the "only non-Polynesian language in Vanuatu to have this preferred word order." (Note: pp. 114-115) Below are a couple of examples of intransitive and transitive sentences.

[Et apam] [a di].
3SG.AOR come S who
'Who's coming?'

[Jim lav aak].
DONT make.noise you.SG
'Don't (you sg.) make a noise!

[Eris lecse-i] [isji-tal] [aarau].
3PL.PAST take.PL-TR fruits-taro they.DU
'The two of them took the taro corms.'

=== Departures from VOS ===
While Anejom̃ has a fairly strict word order, there are times that the language departs from the standard VOS order.

1. Although not very common, subjects and objects are moved to the beginning of the phrase when topicalized.
2. When an object is a fairly long word, it is switched with the subject making the order VSO instead.
3. Indefinite subjects tend to come before verbs, making the order SVO.
4. With the verb 'yek', pronoun subjects follow the verb but noun phrases come before it.

=== Cases ===
Anejom̃ has multiple cases that are denoted by several different case markers summed up below. (Note: p. 119)

Formal variation in case markers
Base form	a (oblique)	ehele (personal locative/directional)	inta (dative/benefactive)	u (locative)	va (casual)	imi (dative/benefactive)
With pronouns
Form	era-	ehele-	imta-	See book §3.5.2.	va-	imi-
Pronoun	POSS.	POSS.	POSS.	See book §3.5.2.	OBJ.	OBJ.
With nouns
Personal	era-i	ehele-i	imta-i	u	va-i	imi
Sing. n-	a	ehele-i	imta-i	u	va-i	imi
Sing. in-	a-	ehele-	imta-	uwu	va-	imi
Sing. other	era-i	ehele-i	imta-i	u	va-i	imi
Plural	era-i	ehele-i	imta-i	u	va-i	imi
Anaphoric
Animate	era-n	ehele-n	imta-n	uwu-n	va-n	
Inanimate	era-n	ehele-n	imta-n	uwu-n	va-ñ	

=== Indicating time and place ===
Temporal phrases can be marked with or without a case depending on the phrase.

==== Unmarked phrases ====
Unmarked temporal phrases take a temporal noun and unmarked locative phrases take either a locative noun or a locative demonstrative. (Note: pp. 120-122) There are two types of local demonstratives: the first type is the one seen in the table below and the second is formed adding locative suffixes (see table earlier on page) to the root 'au'.

Locative demonstratives
	Singular	Dual	Trial	Plural
Proximate	inkahegka, inkaaki, inkahe			inka
Indicated	ap̃niñki, ap̃ni	ap̃rañki	ap̃jiñki	
Intermediate	inkapam, ankehan, añkou			añki
Indicated	ap̃nañkou, ap̃naa	ap̃rañkou		
Distant	inkapan, aaki, ean			eaaki
Indicated	ap̃naikou, ap̃yi			

Locative demonstratives that are formed by adding the locative suffixes to the root au- must follow a specific order:

au - vertical - distance
au - horizontal - distance
au - vertical - horizontal - distance

==== Marked phrases ====
Marked temporal phrases and place phrases (that don't have a non-personal noun at the head), take the case marker 'a'. (Note: pp. 123-24) For non-personal place phrases, the case marker 'u' is used instead. When a place phrase uses a personal noun or pronoun, ehele- is used instead of either 'a' or 'u'.

=== Questions ===
There are two types of questions: yes/no and content questions.

==== Yes/no questions ====
Yes/no questions can be asked in two ways. One way to indicate a question is by ending a phrase on a raised intonation. The second way is to add the word 'ka a'o' (which means 'or no') to the end of a sentence. (Note: pp. 133-135)

===== Content questions =====
Unlike yes/no questions, content questions use interrogative morphemes such as:

- 'who': di
- 'what': inhe
- 'which/which one': panid/panida
- 'when': nuhup̃an
- 'which/which thing': nev(e)-
- 'where': eda (acts like a locative noun)
- 'how to': ehv(e)- (verbal prefix)

=== Combining clauses ===
There are several different ways to combine clauses together: (Note: p. 140)

1. "simple clause chaining"
2. conjunctions
3. using am̃ and p̃ar
4. the "echo-subject proclitic m-
5. verb serialization

==== Simple clause chaining ====
In simple clause chaining, no conjunctions are markings are used to link two separate clauses together. Simple clause chaining can be used either for clauses of the same or different subject and for both verbal and verbless clauses. (Note: pp. 141-143)

[Ekrau edou ajamrau], [ek ap̃ahni añak era-i iji-teptag asga].
1EXC.DU.AOR roam we.EXCL.DU 1SG.AOR go.everywhere I LOC-CS COL-nakamal all
'We wandered around and I went to every single nakamal.'

==== Conjunctions ====
There are three conjunctions that combine clauses in Anejom̃: 'ka', 'jai', and 'jam' which are the equivalents of 'or', 'but' and 'but' respectively. (Note: pp. 143-147)

'Ka'

[Et m̃an ecohos nagesga] ka [a'o]?
3SG.AOR PERF appear sun or no
'Has the sun risen (or not)?'

'Jai' and 'jam' have the same meaning, however 'jai' is used when the subjects of the two combining clauses are different and 'jam' is used when the two combining subjects are the same. 'Jai' is also used when a subject-tense marker occurs at the beginning of the clause following it, regardless of the subject.

'Jai'

[Eris akrou m-alp̃a-i cama], jai [is p̃ar han]...
3PL.AOR share ES-give-TR us.EXCL.PL.O but 3SG.PAST SEQ enough
'They shared it out to us, but there was enough...'

'Jam'

[Eris ago kava lum̃a-n aara] jam [ago is erou].
3PL.PAST make kava POSS.D-his they.PL but.SS make 3SG.PAST two
'They made his kava, but they made two (bowls).'

==== Am̃ and p̃ar ====
Am̃ and p̃ar are also conjunctions that respectively mean 'and' and 'and then, so'. However, they don't function like normal conjunctions but rather aspect markers as seen below.

[Ekris lecse-i u-rau aarau], [is am̃ atpu tah aarau].
3DU.PAST take.PL-TR POSS-3DU they.DU 3SG.PAST and hide one they.DU
'The two of them took theirs, and one of them hid.'

==== M- ====
M- is attached "to the first word in the verb phrase of a non-initial clause which has the same subject as the preceding clause". (Note: pp. 150-151) It can also denote continuous aspect.

[Ekris apan aarau] [m-ago nup̃ut] [m-ago ihnii].
3DU.PAST go they.DU ES-make k.o.laplap ES-make finish
'They two went and made nup̃ut and finished making it.'

==== Verb serialization ====
While verb serialization does not occur much in Anejom̃ in comparison to other Western Oceanic Languages, it occurs more commonly than in its closest related languages. Most of the verb-serializations in Anejom̃ contain directional motion verbs in the non-initial clause as seen below:

[Is m̃an lep rectidai aataj] [apan a-nlii-i niom̃]
PAST PERF again get.up they.TRI go LOC-inside-CS house
'They three got up again and went inside the house.'

=== Relative clauses ===
Relative clauses in Anejom̃ do not have relative pronouns and they directly follow the noun phrase that it is modifying. (Note: p. 155) For example:

{[NP Inworen} enaa {[REL et} amen aan im-le injap̃ era-n.]REL]NP...
place DEM2.SG 3SG.AOR stay he ES-take.SG salt LOC-its
'The place where he got salt from...'

== Sample texts ==
- http://paradisec.org.au/fieldnotes/image_viewer.htm?ANEIT309,3
- Geddie, John (1856). Nitasvitai uhup. ISBN 9780665160059.
- Geddie, John (1865). Nitasvitai irai salm is aged a Tevit Natimarid irai upu Isreel. ISBN 9780665279836.
- "Jenesis, Nitaasviitai Is Aged A Moses (Uhup Aneityum Genesis Translation)".
- Lynch, John and Philip Tepahae (2001). Anejom̃ dictionary. Canberra: Pacific Linguistics

== Notes ==
- from John Lynch’s Grammar of Anejom̃:
- from other sources
