= North Tanna language =

Austronesian language spoken in Vanuatu

North Tanna
- Nɨnakə
- Native to: Vanuatu
- Region: Tanna Island
- Native speakers: 5,000 (2001)
- Language family: Austronesian: Malayo-Polynesian; Oceanic; Southern Oceanic; South Vanuatu; Tanna; North Tanna

Language codes
- ISO 639-3: tnn
- Glottolog: nort2847
- North Tanna is not endangered according to the classification system of the UNESCO Atlas of the World's Languages in Danger

North Tanna is a language spoken on the northern coast of Tanna Island in Vanuatu. It is similar to Whitesands, but its exact position within the Tanna languages is not established.
