= Erromanga (ship) =

There are three vessel listed in Lloyd's register of British and foreign shipping prior to 1880 named Erromanga, they are:

- Erromanga – a wooden barque of 395 tons, built in Greenock in 1845 Owner: J. Kelso, Master: J. Kelso, Port of registry: Greenock, Destined voyage: Clyde to Quebec
- Erromanga – a wooden barque of 361 tons, built in Newcastle in 1844 Owner: R. Hansell, Master: Robinson, Port of registry: North Shields, Destined voyage: Newcastle
- Erromanga – a wooden barque of 309 tons, built in Sunderland in 1856 Owner: L. A. V. Rudolph, Master: E. Polson, Port of registry: Sunderland
- Eromanga (Australian vessel) details as recorded in the 1824–25 edition of Lloyd's register of shipping was as follows: Official number 130166. A steel single screw steamship of 3,359 tons, built by the State Dockyard in Newcastle in 1921 for the Commonwealth Line. In 1926 this vessel was sold to the Australasian United Steam Navigation Company and renamed Maranoa.
