= Whitesands language =

Austronesian language spoken in Vanuatu

Whitesands
- East Tanna
- Narak
- Native to: Vanuatu
- Region: Tanna Island, east coast
- Native speakers: (7,500 cited 2001)
- Language family: Austronesian: Malayo-Polynesian; Oceanic; Southern Oceanic; South Vanuatu; Tanna; Whitesands

Language codes
- ISO 639-3: tnp
- Glottolog: whit1269
- Whitesands is not endangered according to the classification system of the UNESCO Atlas of the World's Languages in Danger

Whitesands, East Tanna, or Narak, is a language spoken on the eastern coast of Tanna, in southern Vanuatu. It is closely related to the neighbouring North Tanna and Lenakel languages.

== Phonology ==
=== Consonants ===
Whitesands has 16 consonant phonemes:

	Labial	Alveolar	Palatal	Velar	Glottal
Nasal	m	n		ŋ	
Plosive	p	t	tʲ	k	
Fricative	f	s		x	h
Rhotic		r ɹ			
Lateral		l			
Semivowel	w		j		

=== Vowels ===
It has six phonemic vowels:

	Front	Central	Back
Close	i	ə	u
Mid	ɛ	ə	ɔ
Open		ɐ	
