= Tanna (island) =

Island in Tafea Province of Vanuatu

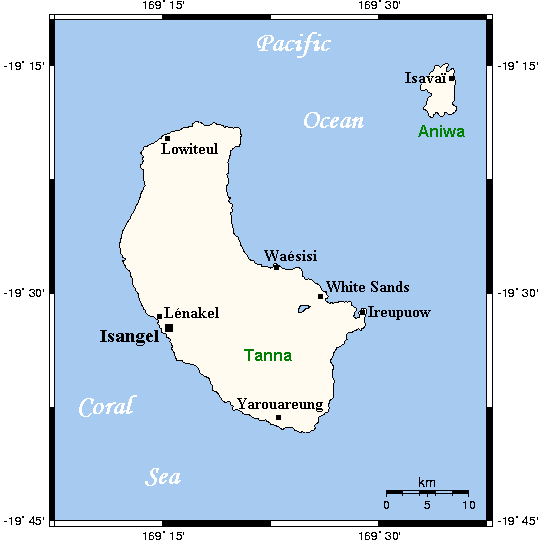
- Tanna and the nearby island of Aniwa

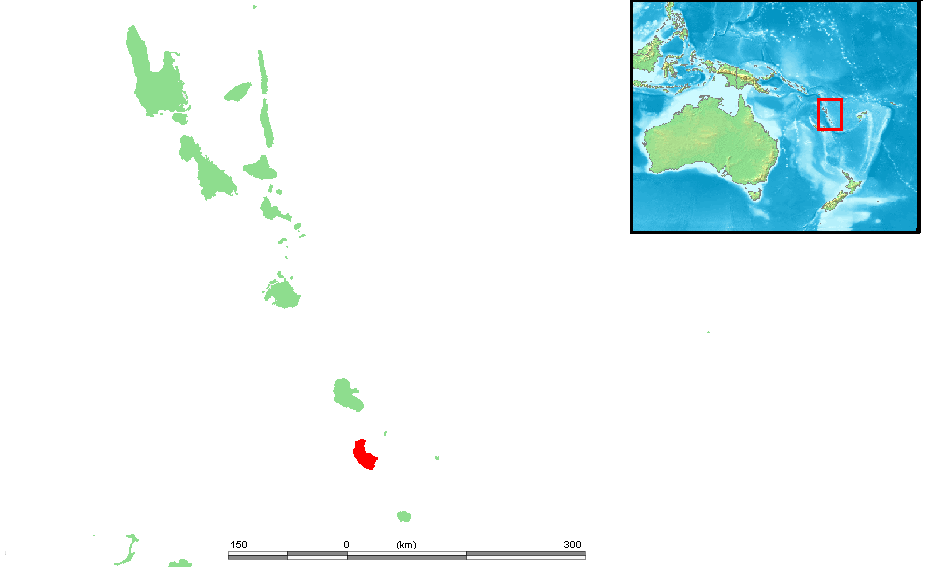

Geography
- Location: South Pacific Ocean
- Coordinates: 19°30′S 169°20′E
- Archipelago: Vanuatu
- Area: 550 km^{2} (210 sq mi)
- Length: 40 km (25 mi)
- Width: 19 km (11.8 mi)
- Highest elevation: 1,084 m (3556 ft)
- Highest point: Mount Tukosmera

Administration
- Vanuatu
- Province: Tafea Province
- Largest settlement: Lénakel

Demographics
- Population: 30,770 (2015)
- Pop. density: 36.36/km^{2} (94.17/sq mi)
- Ethnic groups: Melanesians

Tanna (sometimes misspelled Tana) is an island in southern Vanuatu. Tanna is the most populous island of Tafea Province, and the third most populous in the country (after Efate and Espiritu Santo). It is home to five indigenous languages, which also rank among the most widely spoken in the whole archipelago, ranging from 3,500 to 11,500 speakers.

Tanna has been featured in numerous documentaries and TV shows around the world. This is partly due to Mount Yasur, an active volcano and a major tourist attraction. It is also of interest for its vibrant Melanesian culture, through dances and festivals. The island has attracted the attention of many anthropologists for its cargo cults.

== Name ==
The name Tanna, first cited by James Cook, is derived from the word tana in the Kwamera language, meaning 'earth'. Etymologically, Tanna goes back to Proto-Oceanic *tanoq, from Proto-Malayo-Polynesian *taneq, with the same meaning.

== Geography ==
Tanna is 40 kilometres (25 miles) long and 19 kilometres (12 miles) wide, with a total area of 550 square kilometres (212 square miles). Its highest point is the 1,084-metre (3,556-foot) summit of Mount Tukosmera in the south of the island.

Siwi Lake was located in the east, northeast of the peak, close to the coast, until April 2000 when following unusually heavy rain, the lake burst down the valley into Sulphur Bay, destroying the village with no loss of life. Mount Yasur is an active volcano on the southeast coast.

== History ==
=== Melanesian settlement ===
Tanna was first settled about 400 BC by Melanesians from the surrounding islands.

=== British exploration ===
The glowing light of Mount Yasur attracted James Cook, the first European to visit the island, in August 1774, where he landed in an inlet on the southeastern tip of the island that he named Port Resolution after his ship HMS Resolution.

Cook found a numerous local population of several thousand people at Port Resolution. He fired muskets and cannon to make the people aware of his military superiority and was able to go ashore. Cook found the villagers had extensive plantations of sugar-cane, plaintains, yams and fruit trees. He was able to obtain lumber, water and food supplies in exchange for trinkets and several dogs. Cook shot and wounded one of the locals, while a British marine killed another while obtaining these supplies.

=== Missionaries and traders ===
In the 19th century, traders and missionaries (chiefly Presbyterian) arrived. The Tannese stuck to their traditions more strongly than other islands; there remain fewer Christians in comparison with the other islands of Vanuatu. Whaling vessels were some of the first regular visitors to the island in the 19th century. The first on record was the Rose in February 1804. The last known such visit was by the Sea Ranger in September 1871.

Flag of the Island of Tanna

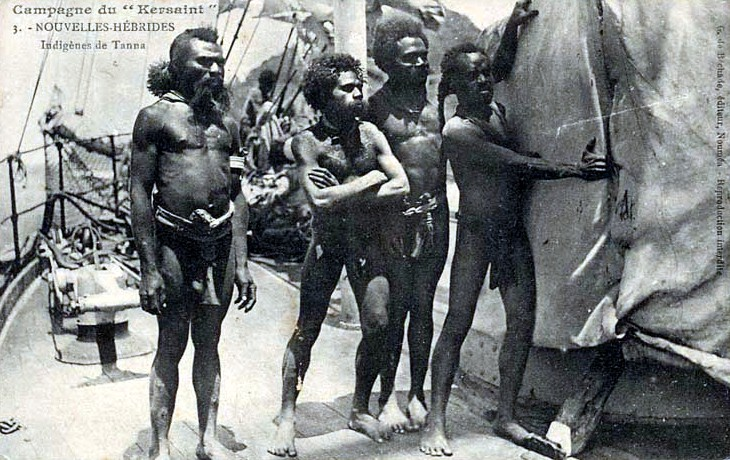
1905 postcard of Tanna natives.

In 1825, the merchant Peter Dillon arrived at Port Resolution seeking new sources of sandalwood. He shot and wounded a local man and obtained knowledge that the sandalwood tree grew in abundance on the nearby island of Erromango.

=== World War II ===
Tanna was not a principal site of World War II, but about 1,000 people from Tanna were recruited to work on the American military base on Éfaté. Exposure to First World living standards may have led to the development of cargo cults. Many have died out, but the John Frum cult remains strong on Tanna today, especially at Sulphur Bay in the southeast and Green Point in the southwest of the Island. The documentary Waiting for John (2015) by Jessica Sherry provides a history and overview of the current scene regarding these beliefs.

=== Secession movement and incorporation into Vanuatu ===
A secessionist movement began in the 1970s, and the Nation of Tanna was proclaimed on 24 March 1974. While the British were more open to allowing its holdings in Vanuatu to achieve independence, it was opposed by the French colonists and finally suppressed by the Anglo-French Condominium authorities on 29 June 1974. In 1980, there was another attempt to secede, declaring the Tafea Nation on 1 January 1980, its name coming from the initials of the five islands that were to be part of the nation (Tanna, Aniwa, Futuna, Erromango and Aneityum). British forces intervened on 26 May 1980, allowing the island to become part of the newly independent nation of Vanuatu on 30 July 1980.

=== Cyclone Pam ===
Tanna and nearby Erromango were devastated by Cyclone Pam in March 2015, with reports of an unknown number of deaths, complete destruction of the island's infrastructure and permanent shelters, and no drinking water. Following this, an El Niño-spurred drought further impacted on the people of Tanna.

== Culture and economy ==
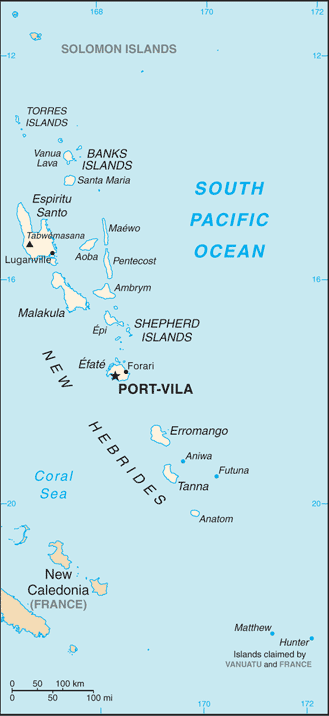
Tanna's location.

=== Population ===
Tanna is the most populous island in Tafea Province, and one of the most populous islands in the country with a population of about 29,000 in 2009, which grew to 30,770 in 2015. Isangel, the provincial administrative capital, is on the west coast near the island's largest town of Lénakel. Tanna is populated almost entirely by Melanesians, and they follow a more traditional lifestyle than many other islands. Some of the higher altitude villages are known as kastom villages, where modern inventions are restricted, the inhabitants wear penis sheaths (Bislama: nambas) and grass skirts, and the children do not go to public school. According to anthropologist Joël Bonnemaison, author of "The Tree and the Canoe: history and ethnography of Tanna," their resistance to change derives from their traditional worldview and how they "perceive, internalise, and account for the dual concepts of space and time."

=== Cargo cults ===
The island is the centre of the John Frum religious movement, which attracts tourist interest as a cargo cult. The first John appeared at night as a spirit at a place called Green Point beach and told the people to return to their traditional way of life, or kastom. From that time kastom on Tanna has been seen as an alternative to the modernity encouraged by many missionary denominations.

Yaohnanen is the centre of the Prince Philip movement, which reveres Prince Philip, Duke of Edinburgh, the late husband of Queen Elizabeth II. The cult is examined by British writer Matthew Baylis in his 2013 book Man Belong Mrs Queen: Adventures with the Philip Worshippers. Five men from the cargo cult were brought to the United Kingdom as part of the Channel 4 reality show Meet the Natives in 2007. Part of their itinerary included an off-screen meeting with the prince. In An Idiot Abroad, Series 2, Episode 1, Karl Pilkington visited Tanna and discussed the Prince Philip Movement and met those who visited Windsor Castle.

Christian missionary John Gibson Paton served in Tanna in the mid 19th century. Cannibalism was practiced before Christianity swept the island. The biography of Paton includes passages detailing the abuse and murder of disobedient wives.

=== Languages ===
There are five main languages spoken on Tanna: the southern language of Kwamera and the Southwestern language adjacent to the slopes of Tokosmera, of which there are many dialects spoken by very small groupings, constitute two of the languages. The remaining majority of Tanna islanders speak four dialects, being North Tanna in the northwest, Lénakel in the west-central area near Lénakel, and the middle bush dialect in the central plateau of the island, which is very close to Lenakel Whitesands in the northeast near Whitesands.

The five languages of Tanna feature among the most populous among all the indigenous languages of Vanuatu:

Language	Other names	Speakers	ISO 639-3
Kwamera	Nafe, Nɨfe	3500	tnk
North Tanna		5000	tnn
Southwest Tanna	Nawal	5000	nwi
Whitesands	Narak	7500	tnp
Lenakel	Netvaar	11500	tnl

These are grouped into the Tanna languages family, which is a subgroup of the South Vanuatu languages, a branch of the Oceanic languages. Many people on Tanna also speak Bislama, which is one of Vanuatu's three official languages (together with English and French).

=== Economy ===
The island is one of the most fertile in Vanuatu and produces kava, coffee, coconut, copra, and other fruits and vegetables. Recently, tourism has become more important, as tourists are attracted to the volcano and traditional culture. To help preserve the integrity of culture as a tourism asset, only local people are permitted to act as guides. There are various types of accommodation on the island.

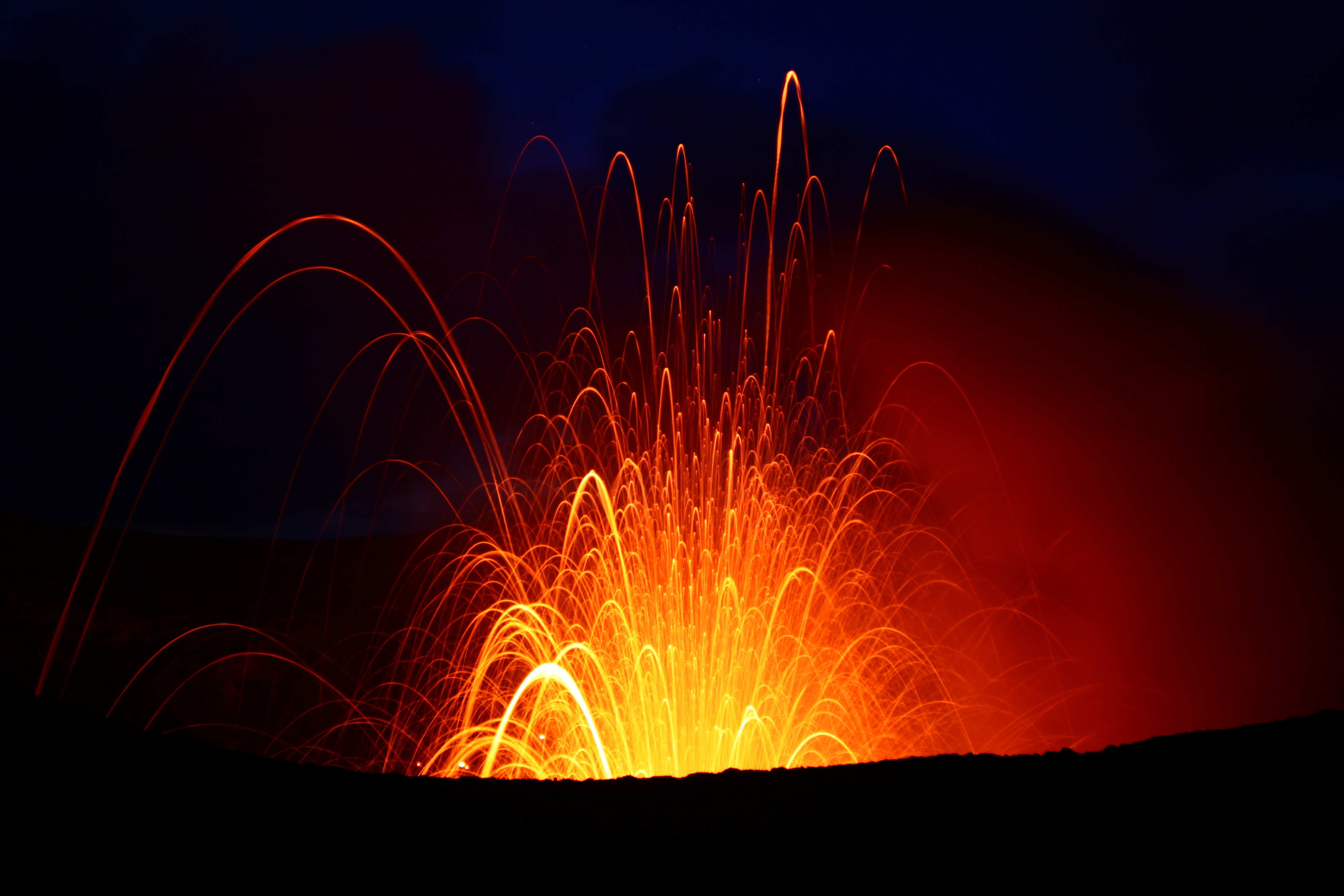
The active volcano, Mount Yasur, at dusk.

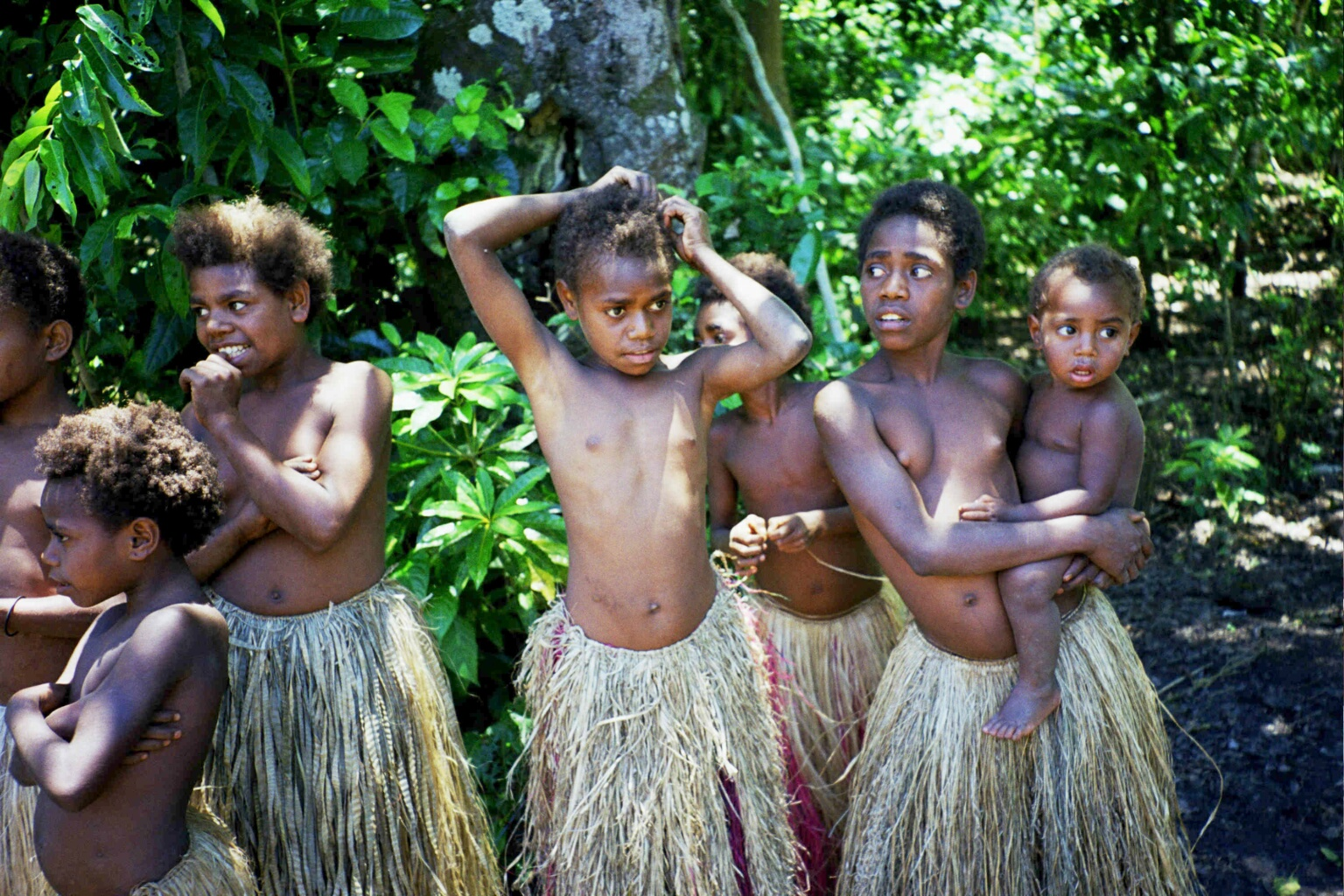
Children from Yakel Village.

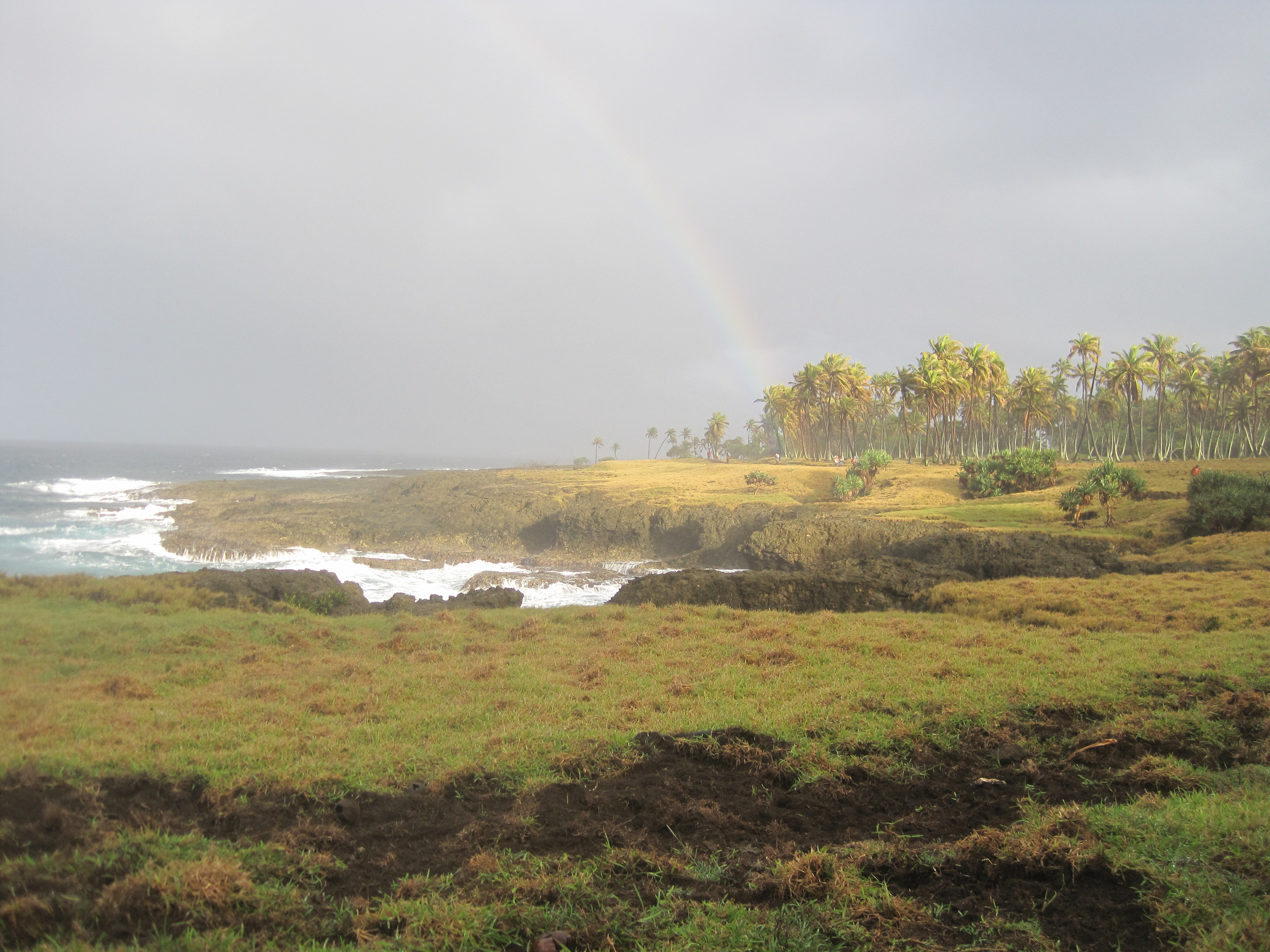
Coast of Tanna after rain.

== Cultural references ==
In 2009 the Travel Channel aired Meet the Natives: USA, which brought five men from another group from Tanna to the United States. Their tribe reveres John Frum, an American World War II sailor who generations ago had taught the inhabitants to live in peace. The Tanna ambassadors were taken across, visiting five states, and eventually meeting former United States Secretary of State Colin Powell and verifying with him that the spirit of peace taught by John Frum lives on in then-US President, Barack Obama. While visiting with a family on Fort Stewart, US Army Major-General Tony Cucolo conferred a World War II Victory Medal and an Asiatic-Pacific Campaign Medal upon the chief in representation of the contributions of the people of Tanna in World War II.

Tanna, a film depicting the true story of a couple who decided to marry for love, rather than obey their parents' wishes, is set on the island, and was nominated for the Best Foreign Language Film at the 89th Academy Awards.

In 1993, Ken Campbell performed a one man show called Jamais Vu about his adventures on the island of Tanna, searching for the tribes that worshiped 'Prince Pilip' (Prince Philip, Duke of Edinburgh).

== Transportation ==
The island is served by Whitegrass Airport.

== Filmography ==
God is American, feature documentary (2007, 52 min), by Richard Martin-Jordan, on John Frum's cult at Tanna.
