= South Vanuatu languages =

Subgroup of the Oceanic branch of the Austronesian language family

South Vanuatu
- Geographic distribution: Southern Vanuatu
- Linguistic classification: Austronesian: Malayo-Polynesian; Oceanic; Southern Oceanic; South Vanuatu
- Proto-language: Proto-South Vanuatu

Language codes
- Glottolog: sout2868

The nine South Vanuatu languages form a family of the Southern Oceanic languages, spoken in Tafea Province (Tanna, Aneityum, Futuna, Erromango, and Aniwa) of Vanuatu.

== Languages ==
- Erromango family
  - Southern: Sie, Sorung†
  - Northern: Ifo (Utaha)†, Ura
    (more information here)
- Tanna family
  - Southern: Kwamera (South Tanna), Southwest Tanna
  - Northern: Lenakel (West Tanna), Whitesands (Weasisi, East Tanna), North Tanna
- Aneityum
  - Aneityum (Anejom̃)

=== François et al. (2015) ===
François et al. (2015:18–21) lists the following names and locations for the 9 South Vanuatu languages.

No.	Language	Other names	Speakers	ISO 639-3	Region
128	Sie	Se, Erromanga	1900	erg	Erromango
129	Ura		6	uur	Erromango
130	Utaha		0	iff	Erromango
131	North Tanna		5000	tnn	Tanna
132	Lenakel	Netvaar	11500	tnl	Tanna
133	Southwest Tanna	Nawal	5000	nwi	Tanna
134	Whitesands	Narak	7500	tnp	Tanna
135	Kwamera	Nafe, Nɨfe	3500	tnk	Tanna
137	Anejom̃	Aneityum	900	aty	Aneityum

== Proto-South Vanuatu ==
Proto-South Vanuatu
- PSV
- Reconstruction of: South Vanuatu languages
- Reconstructed ancestors: Proto-Austronesian: Proto-Malayo-Polynesian; Proto-Oceanic

Proto-South Vanuatu was reconstructed by John Lynch in 2001.

The language, compared to Proto-Oceanic, went through a series of vowel reductions, leading to the creation of a new vowel written as *ə, such as in *na-waiR "fresh water" resulting in Proto-South Vanuatu *nə-wai of the same meaning.

However, it also preserves some, but not all final consonants. For example, *tanum "to plant, bury" is reflected in Proto-South Vanuatu as *(a)-tenum "to bury", but *taŋis "to cry" is instead reflected as *(a)-taŋi.

=== Vowels ===
The vowels of Proto-South Vanuatu, according to Lynch, are:

Vowels
	Front	Central	Back
Close	*i		*u
Close-mid	*e	*ə	*o
Open		*a	

=== Consonants ===
The consonants of Proto-South Vanuatu, according to Lynch, are:

Consonants
		Labiovelar	Bilabial	Alveolar	Palatal	Velar	Uvular
Stop	voiced	*bʷ	*b	*d		*g	
Stop	voiceless	*pʷ	*p	*t		*k	*q
Nasal		*mʷ	*m	*n		*ŋ	
Fricative		*v		*s	*c, *ɟ	*ɣ	
Approximant		*w		*l, *r	*j		
