= Erromango =

Fourth largest island in the Vanuatu archipelago

Native name: Nelocopne
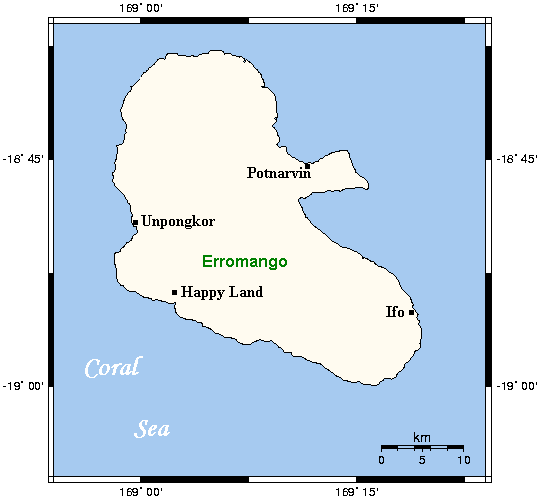
- Map of Erromango Island

- Location within Vanuatu Location within Oceania Location within Pacific Ocean

Geography
- Location: Coral Sea
- Coordinates: 18°48′50″S 169°07′22″E
- Archipelago: Vanuatu
- Area: 891.9 km^{2} (344.4 sq mi)
- Length: 48 km (29.8 mi)
- Width: 30 km (19 mi)
- Highest elevation: 886 m (2907 ft)
- Highest point: Mount Santop

Administration
- Vanuatu
- Province: Tafea Province
- Largest settlement: Upogkor

Demographics
- Population: 2,084 (2009)
- Pop. density: 2.34/km^{2} (6.06/sq mi)
- Languages: Sie, Bislama, English, French, Ura (moribund), formerly Utaha and Sorung
- Ethnic groups: Ni-Vanuatu

Additional information
- Time zone: VUT (UTC+11)

Erromango is the fourth largest island in the Vanuatu archipelago. With a land area of 891.9 square kilometres (344.4 sq mi), it is the largest island in Tafea Province, the southernmost of Vanuatu's six administrative regions.

== Name ==
The endonym for Erromango in Erromangan is Nelocompne. There are several accounts of how 'Erromango' came into common usage: firstly, an oral history from the Potnarvin area tells of how Captain James Cook was given a yam during his visit in August 1774, and was told in the (now-extinct) Sorung language armai n'go, armai n'go ('this food is good'), and mistakenly assumed this to be the name of the island.

A second account is related by the naturalist Georg Forster, who accompanied Cook. He writes that, while visiting the neighbouring island of Tanna five days later, he learnt from a local named Fannòko that the word 'Irromanga' or 'Erramange' meant 'man'. Cook himself wrote later that he got the name, which he spells as 'Erromango', during discussions with people on Tanna, from which he also learnt the names of the surrounding islands such as Futuna and Annattom (Aneityum).

== History ==
=== Lapita migration ===
Erromango was first settled by humans around 3,000 years ago, as part of the Lapita migration out of south-east Asia into island Melanesia. The Lapita people brought with them domestic animals such as pigs and chickens and food plants such as yam and breadfruit.

Two sites on Erromango, Ifo and Ponamla, have yielded significant archaeological evidence of habitation by Lapita and post-Lapita peoples, including pottery sherds, adzes, marine shell artifacts and cooking stones.

Erromango contains numerous caves that provided refuge from tribal warfare and cyclones. Human use of these caves has been dated to 2,800–2,400 years before the present. Some of the caves contain rock art and petroglyphs that have been identified with clan motifs and traditional stories. Caves were also used as burial sites.

=== British exploration and conflict ===
James Cook was the first European to visit Erromango, landing near present-day Potnarvin in the north-east on 4 August 1774. Cook and his landing party were received with "great courtesy and politeness" by the local people, but when they insisted on hauling Cook's boat onto the shore, Cook took offence and fired his musket at one of the men. The shot misfired and a skirmish followed. Two of Cook's men were slightly injured and around four of the Erromangans were killed. Upon returning to his ship, Cook fired a four-pound cannon at the villagers. Following this incident, Cook gave the name 'Traitor's Head' to the peninsula adjacent to Potnarvin.

A painting of the conflict between Cook and the Erromangans entitled The Landing at Erramanga, one of the New Hebrides was later produced by William Hodges.

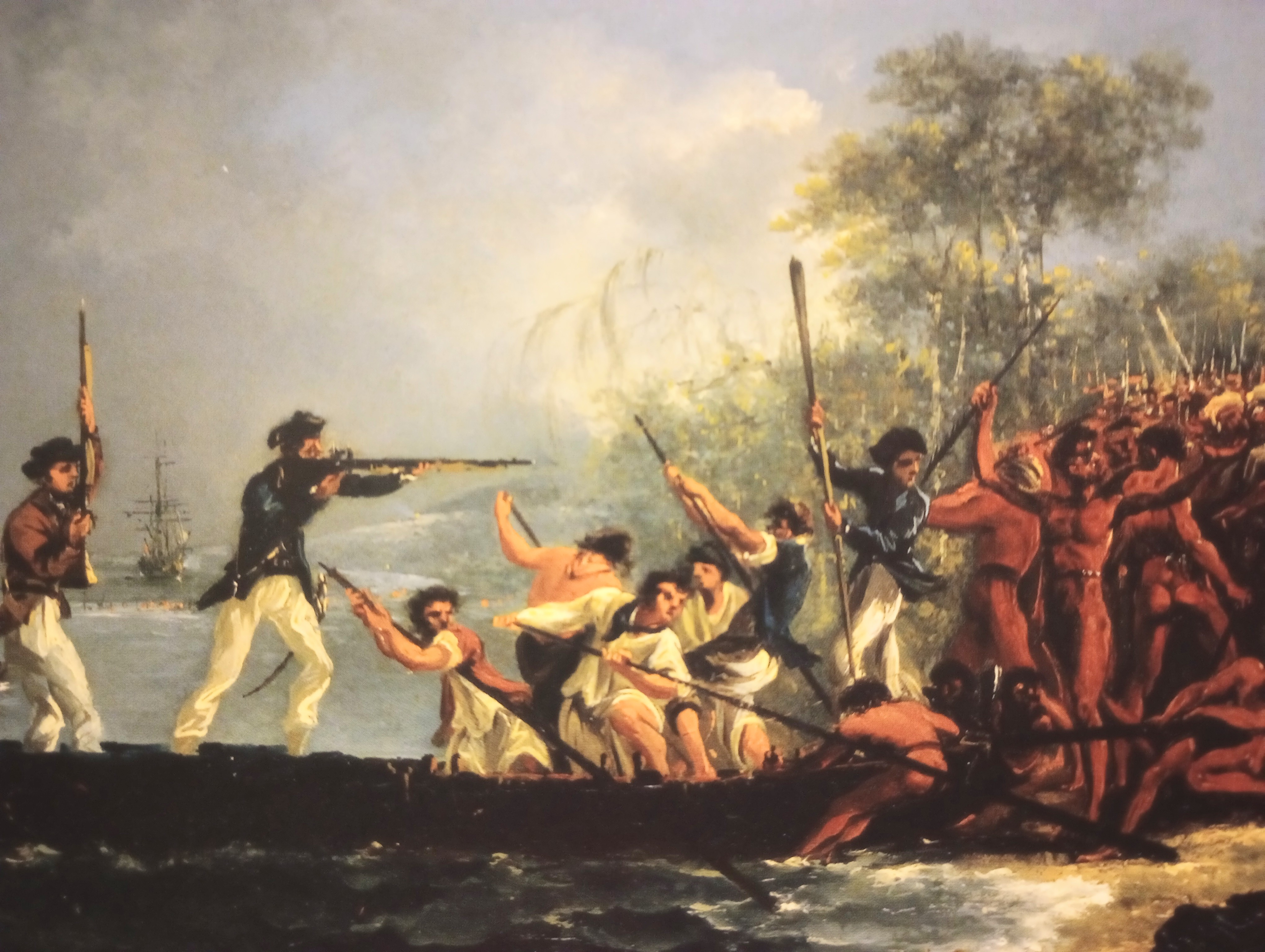
The Landing at Erramanga, one of the New Hebrides by William Hodges depicting James Cook firing at a group of Erromangans

=== Whalers ===
Whaling vessels were among the early regular visitors to the island on the nineteenth century. The first such vessel known to have visited was the Rose in 1804 and the last on record was the American vessel John & Winthrop in 1887.

=== The sandalwood trade ===
In 1825, trader and adventurer Peter Dillon was informed of the island's large reserves of sandalwood (Santalum austrocaledonicum), valued in China for its aromatic oil and as a carving wood. Dillon found that his trade goods were not sufficient to entice Erromangans to cut the timber for him, but his crew were still able to load a substantial quantity of sandalwood. Dillon later told Samuel Pinder Henry (son of the pioneering Tahiti missionary, William Henry) of his discovery which brought other outsiders to Erromango to exploit the resource. This caused conflict between the Erromangans and the traders.

In 1830, King Kamehameha III of Hawaii sent two ships with 479 Hawaiians on board to seize control of Erromango and its sandalwood, under the command of Boki, ruler-designate of Erromango. Their arrival in Cook's Bay coincided with the arrival of several other groups of traders intent on exploiting the sandalwood. Two ships, the Dhaule and the Sophia, both crewed by 330 Rotuman labourers and another ship, the Snapper, captained by Samuel Pinder Henry with a crew of 113 Tongan labourers on board, had all arrived just before the Hawaiian vessels.

One of the Hawaiian ships was accidentally blown up while anchored off Erromango, killing most of those on board including Boki. It appeared that the vessel's storage of gunpowder was inadvertently ignited. The Erromangans forcefully resisted the attempts of the remaining Hawaiians and the traders and their Polynesian crews to access their island. An introduced disease epidemic killed most of the Tongan and Hawaiian labourers as well as many of the local Erromangans. Only 20 Hawaiians were able to return to their homeland after their failed occupation. Despite the mortality, Samuel Henry's group was still able to extract up to four tonnes of cut sandalwood per day from Erromango. Nearly a hundred of his Tongan labourers died harvesting the wood which Henry was later able to sell for significant profit.

A crash in the price of sandalwood shortly after deterred most traders until the mid-1840s, but even when prices rose again, the combined risks of attack on shore, uncharted reefs, storms and hurricanes meant that sandalwood trading was a highly speculative venture. Some traders such as Robert Towns and James Paddon established stations on Erromango or nearby islands such as Aneityum and Île des Pins in New Caledonia to reduce their costs. By 1865 though, Erromango's sandalwood resource was exhausted.

=== Introduced diseases and depopulation ===
Erromango's population prior to European contact is estimated at 5,000, though some estimates are as high as 20,000. European visitors brought diseases such as influenza, smallpox and measles to which the local population had no immunity. Sixty percent of Erromangans died during a smallpox outbreak in 1853 and a measles epidemic in 1861.

Contemporary accounts by missionaries blamed the sandalwood traders for the outbreaks. Erromangans sought reprisal by killing European and Polynesian missionaries such as George N. Gordon, their converts, and other visitors.

=== The labour trade and blackbirding ===
Between 1863 and 1906, around 40,000 people from what was then the New Hebrides were blackbirded onto ships to work as indentured labour on cotton and sugarcane plantations in Queensland, Australia. Another 10,000 went to work in nickel mines in New Caledonia and on plantations in Fiji, Samoa and Hawaii. Many of the islanders recruited were duped into taking part; some were coerced, and some volunteered. While some Erromangan names are listed in official records of Melanesian labourers in Queensland, no exact figures exist for the number of Erromangans who were blackbirded. However, 25 years after the White Australia Policy ended the Melanesian labour trade in 1906, Erromango's population had dwindled to just 381.

=== Missionaries ===
John Williams of the London Missionary Society and fellow missionary James Harris were killed and eaten by cannibals at Dillons Bay in November 1839. In November 2009, after a lengthy collaboration between the Museum of Anthropology at the University of British Columbia, the Presbyterian church of Vanuatu and the Vanuatu Cultural Centre, Williams' descendants travelled to Erromango to reconcile with the descendants of those who killed their ancestor, the Uswo-Natgo clan, 170 years earlier. To mark the occasion, Dillons Bay was renamed Williams Bay.

The Rev. George Nicol Gordon, of Prince Edward Island, Canada and his wife, Ellen Catherine Powell, missionaries from the Presbyterian Church of Nova Scotia to the New Hebrides, were killed at Dillons Bay on May 20, 1861. A memoir of the couple appeared in book form, at Halifax, Nova Scotia in 1863.

In total, six missionaries were killed on Erromango. An oral history from Unpogkor (Dillons Bay) says Rev. Williams was killed because he disrespected an important kastom ceremony that was taking place when he landed. The Boy's Own Paper (1879) states that Rev. Williams and a Mr. Harris (identified as a man traveling to England to become a missionary) were killed because they arrived on the island shortly after an "outrage" was committed by the crew of another vessel. (The nature of this "outrage" is not stated in the article.) The pair, realizing their danger, died during a failed attempt to escape the island, being killed by natives on shore a few yards from their boat.

As Williams was the first Christian martyr in the south Pacific, Erromango became a particular focus for missionisation. Another missionary, Reverend McNair and his wife, were present on the island at Dillon's Bay until the former's death from illness in 1871. A Royal Navy captain visiting in 1869 described the conditions there as difficult, with scarce supplies of flour, clouds of mosquitoes, murderous threats from natives, and a "sweltering poisonous atmosphere, accompanied by fever and ague."

Canadian Presbyterian missionary H.A. Robertson, resident on Erromango from 1872 to 1913, succeeded in missionising the island's population. This changed the traditional society of the island. His attempts at missionisation were effective because he carefully studied the beliefs and material culture in order to target the most powerful symbols of traditional society. He collected many objects and sent them to overseas museums or used them as curios in his overseas fundraising tours to demonstrate the 'backwardness' of Erromangans.

In 1902, Robertson published Erromanga: the Martyr Isle, his description of his life as a missionary on the island. It was the first popular account of Erromango and its people. It promoted to a global audience the idea that Erromango was the 'Martyr's Island'.

Robertson's predecessor, Rev. James D. Gordon, had spread the belief amongst Erromangans that the Christian God had sent the 1861 measles epidemic to punish them for the killing of Rev. Williams and the other missionaries. Gordon saw this as a means of gaining converts, though some of his contemporaries disapproved of this tactic. This tactic backfired on Gordon, as he and his wife were killed in reprisal for the epidemic, which continued unabated despite their deaths. Over time, Gordon's myth grew into a collective belief amongst Erromangans that the island had been cursed by the Presbyterian Church. This caused the abandonment of forms of cultural expression not sanctioned by the church. Belief in this 'curse' endured until the 2009 reconciliation ceremony, which initiated a re-examination of Erromango's history and culture from an Erromangan point of view. According to a participant, "the reconciliation has freed us up to embrace our customs and traditions, which we couldn't do before because of the guilt attached to Erromango's history and the tendency to view traditional culture as the antithesis of Christianity".

=== Later history ===
Erromango and nearby Tanna were devastated by cyclone Pam in mid-March 2015, with reports from Tanna of an unknown number of deaths, complete destruction of the island's infrastructure and permanent shelters, no drinking water.

== Geography ==
The total area of Erromango is 891.9 km^{2}. It measures approximately 48 km from the north-west tip to the south-east, and is between 20 and 30 kilometres wide. Its highest point is Mount Santop, at 886m. The island is situated between latitude 18°37'S and 18°59'S and 168°59'E and 168°20'E. Vete Manung Island is located 15 km off the north-east coast of Erromango.

In the middle of the east coast is a promontory formed by the volcanic cone of Mount Rantop. 6 km off the east coast is an uninhabited islet named Vetemanu (English name Goat Island) of approximately 12ha in area.

The island is part of the Vanuatu rainforests ecoregion, within the East Melanesian Islands biogeographic region. Dense evergreen forest covers nearly three-quarters of the island on the windward (eastern) side, while a combination of grassland and woodland occupies the north-west. Cloud forests exist at higher elevations. Much of the vegetation on the island is secondary growth.

Formerly it was known as a source of sandalwood in the 19th century, and much of it was depleted. It is also home to the kauri and tamanu trees. There has been extensive logging, but most of the area is recovering, and efforts are underway to try to make the industry sustainable. With European Union support, there is a protected Happy Lands Kauri Reserve.

=== Climate ===
Climate data for Erromango (elevation 198 m) (1949–2019)
Month	Jan	Feb	Mar	Apr	May	Jun	Jul	Aug	Sep	Oct	Nov	Dec	Year
Record high °C (°F)	32.5 (90.5)	32.0 (89.6)	32.0 (89.6)	31.2 (88.2)	30.7 (87.3)	28.9 (84.0)	27.8 (82.0)	28.3 (82.9)	30.2 (86.4)	31.1 (88.0)	32.5 (90.5)	31.7 (89.1)	32.5 (90.5)
Mean daily maximum °C (°F)	27.9 (82.2)	28.5 (83.3)	27.4 (81.3)	26.5 (79.7)	25.6 (78.1)	24.3 (75.7)	23.5 (74.3)	23.7 (74.7)	24.4 (75.9)	26.2 (79.2)	27.0 (80.6)	27.7 (81.9)	26.0 (78.8)
Daily mean °C (°F)	25.3 (77.5)	25.7 (78.3)	25.1 (77.2)	24.1 (75.4)	23.1 (73.6)	22.0 (71.6)	21.1 (70.0)	21.0 (69.8)	21.8 (71.2)	23.1 (73.6)	24.1 (75.4)	25.0 (77.0)	23.5 (74.2)
Mean daily minimum °C (°F)	22.6 (72.7)	22.9 (73.2)	22.7 (72.9)	21.6 (70.9)	20.7 (69.3)	19.8 (67.6)	18.7 (65.7)	18.3 (64.9)	19.2 (66.6)	20.0 (68.0)	21.3 (70.3)	22.2 (72.0)	20.8 (69.5)
Record low °C (°F)	17.8 (64.0)	19.0 (66.2)	17.8 (64.0)	16.7 (62.1)	16.1 (61.0)	14.4 (57.9)	12.8 (55.0)	12.8 (55.0)	13.9 (57.0)	14.4 (57.9)	16.7 (62.1)	16.1 (61.0)	12.8 (55.0)
Average precipitation mm (inches)	308.5 (12.15)	165.9 (6.53)	371.1 (14.61)	148.7 (5.85)	167.0 (6.57)	94.4 (3.72)	107.0 (4.21)	79.2 (3.12)	89.2 (3.51)	67.9 (2.67)	95.3 (3.75)	285.0 (11.22)	1,979.2 (77.91)
Average precipitation days (≥ 1.0 mm)	18.1	15.3	20.2	14.4	11.5	12.2	11.2	7.9	9.9	6.2	11.3	15.7	154.0
Source: NOAA

== Geology ==
Erromango, like most other islands of the Vanuatu archipelago, is volcanic in origin. It is composed of basalt and andesite from the late Miocene-Recent periods and is situated along a Pliocene-Recent volcanic chain that is moving to the north-northwest. Most of the island is fringed with a platform of uplifted coral reef limestone dating from the Late Pleistocene and Holocene.

=== Volcanism ===
Erromango was formed during a prolonged period of volcanic activity took place between 6 and 1 Ma. The island is an ancient underwater volcano that has been raised 100-300m above sea level by tectonic uplift, forming a plateau on which stand three sets of eroded volcanic cones in the centre, north and east of the island. The centre is divided into two volcanoes; Mount Melkum (758m) to the west, and Nompun Umpan (802m) to the east. In the north of the island, Mount William (682m) is a strombolian cone with a caldera 6 km wide and around 600m deep. The eastern peninsula that forms Traitor's Head, north of Cook's Bay on the east coast, is the youngest volcanic formation on the island and consists of four stratovolcanoes (Urap, Ulenu, Rantop and Wahous). A submarine volcano between the peninsula and nearby Vetemanu last erupted in 1881.

== Population ==
Erromango's population at the last census in 2009 was 1,959. The annual population growth rate is 2.2%, and there are a total of 325 private households on the island. The largest villages are Dillons Bay (Upogkor), Potnarvin and Ipota.

== Languages ==
Erromango was linguistically diverse prior to European contact. Since contact, however, Erromango has lost between 67% and 83% of its original languages. The island "has the dubious honour of having suffered the greatest amount of linguistic devastation in the region of Oceania outside of Australia", according to Pacific linguist Terry Crowley.

While the original distribution of languages is not well documented, there were originally at least four distinct Erromangan languages: Enyau/Yocu, Ura (also known as Aryau), Utaha (also known as Etiyo or Ifo) and Sorug/Sye (also spelt Sie or Siye). Sorug and Utaha are now extinct and only a few elderly Ura speakers remain. These four languages constitute the Erromanga branch of South Vanuatu languages.

Due to a lack of documentation, it is unclear whether Sorug and Sye were two distinct languages or whether they were dialects of a single language. There is also evidence of two additional speech forms, Novulamleg and Uravat, though it is not known whether these were dialectical variants, distinct languages, place or area names, names of descent groups or simply descriptive names.

The depopulation that followed the series of epidemics of the mid-19th century resulted in a linguistic realignment. Villages that were no longer viable because of population loss either relocated or amalgamated with others, and the island's population dispersed. Yocu/Enyau was the dominant language during the late 19th century, as it was the language of the Dillons Bay area where the missionaries were based, and the language used in the first missionary bibles.

Enyau/Yocu and Sorug/Sye merged between the 1870s and 1920s to become modern Erromangan. Some linguists call this language Sye, however on Erromango nam Eromaga ('Erromangan language') is more common.

Erromangan is spoken as the first language in 90.4% of Erromango's households. Of Erromangans over the age of five, 63.6% are literate in Bislama, Vanuatu's lingua franca. 62.3% are literate in English and 19.0% are literate in French, Vanuatu's two official languages.

== Transportation ==
The island is served by two airstrips: Dillon's Bay Airport in the west and Ipota Airport in the east.
