= Culture of Vanuatu =

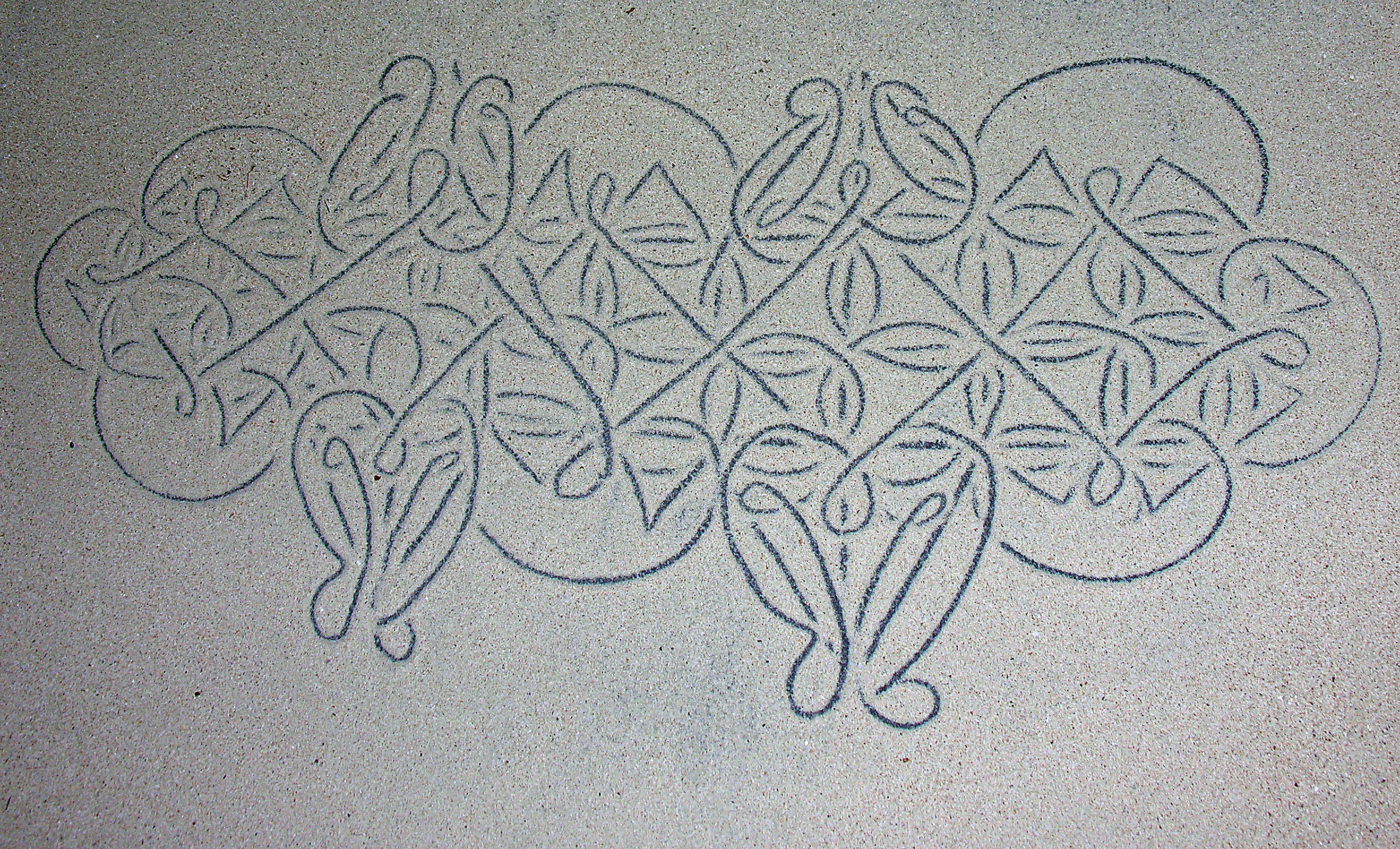
Sand drawing from Vanuatu, an art form recognised by UNESCO as a Masterpiece of the Oral and Intangible Heritage of Humanity.

This article presents an overview of the culture of Vanuatu.

== Social system and customs ==
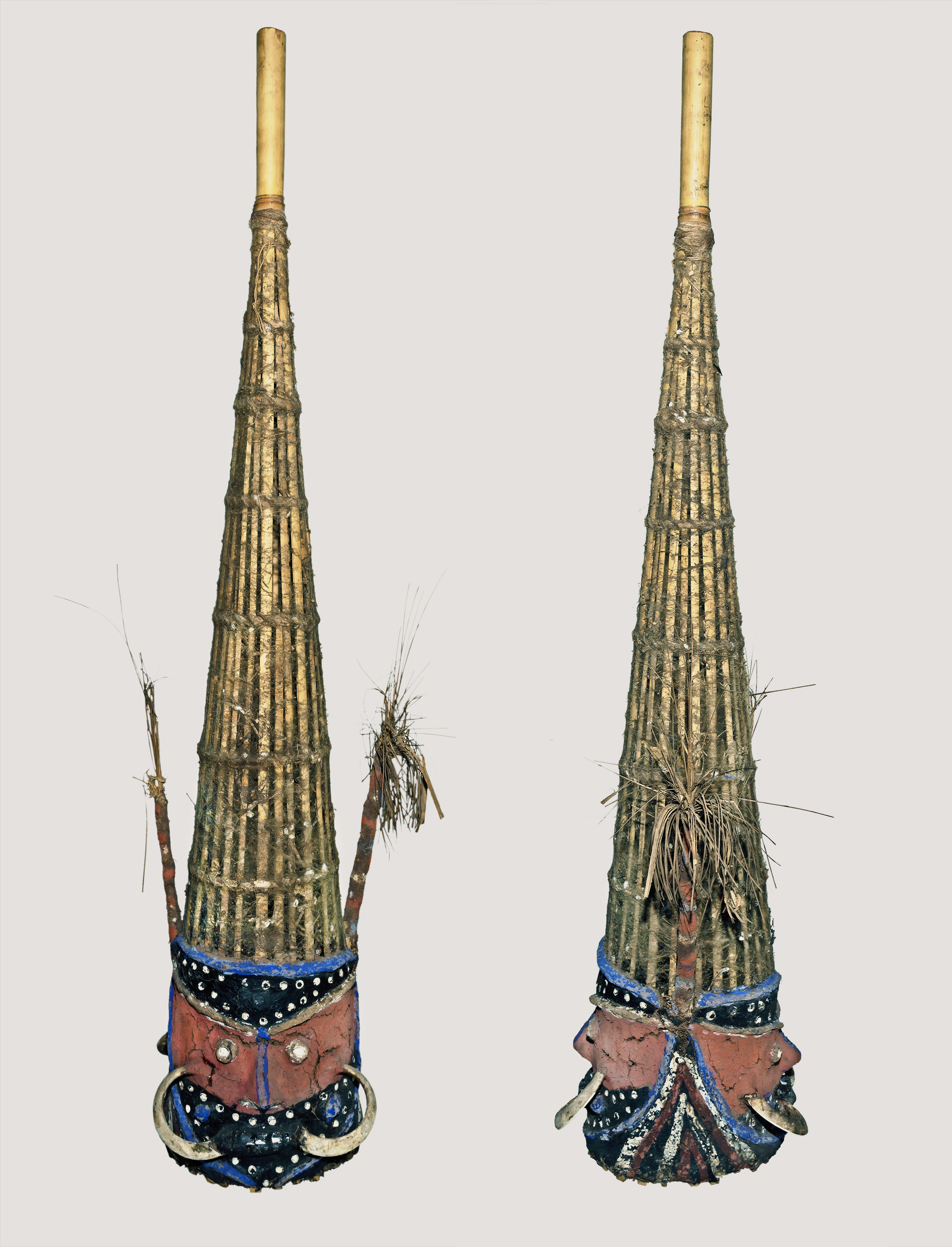
Funeral masks, Malakula Island nineteenth century MHNT

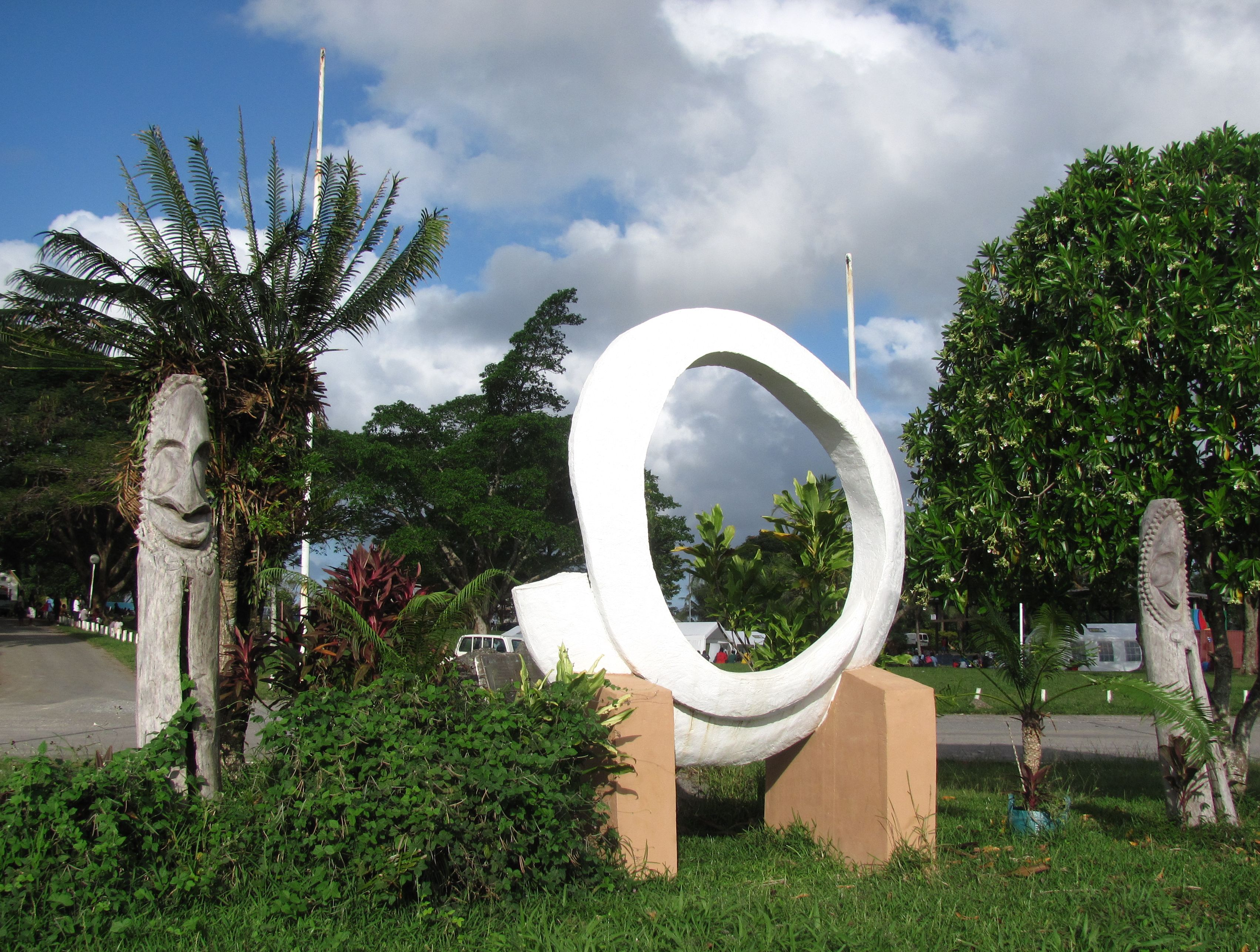
A memorial in Port Vila representing totem poles and a rounded tusk

Vanuatu culture retains a strong diversity through local regional variations and through foreign influence. Vanuatu may be divided into three major cultural regions. In the north, wealth is established by how much one can give away, through a system of grade-taking. Pigs, particularly those with rounded tusks, are considered a symbol of wealth throughout Vanuatu. In the center, more traditional Melanesian cultural systems dominate. In the south, a system involving grants of title with associated privileges has developed.

Young men undergo various coming-of-age ceremonies and rituals to initiate them into manhood, usually including circumcision.

== Music ==
Traditional music (known in Bislama as kastom singsing or kastom tanis) is still thriving in the rural areas of Vanuatu. Musical instruments consist mostly of idiophones: drums of various shape and size, rattles, among others. In various regions, aerophones, such as whistles or bamboo flutes, used to be played; membranophones and chordophones were also found in some areas, but have fallen into disuse in recent generations.

The large slit gongs which symbolize Vanuatu belong to these instruments; they were most often used as musical drums to accompany certain dances, but also sometimes – though seldom – as a ritual means of communication; although widespread throughout Vanuatu, they are used vertically only in central areas of the archipelago (mainly on Ambrym). Traditional music is actually a very general cover term encompassing a wide and complex variety of musical genres known by every local community – in a way similar to the vague term classical music of Western societies.

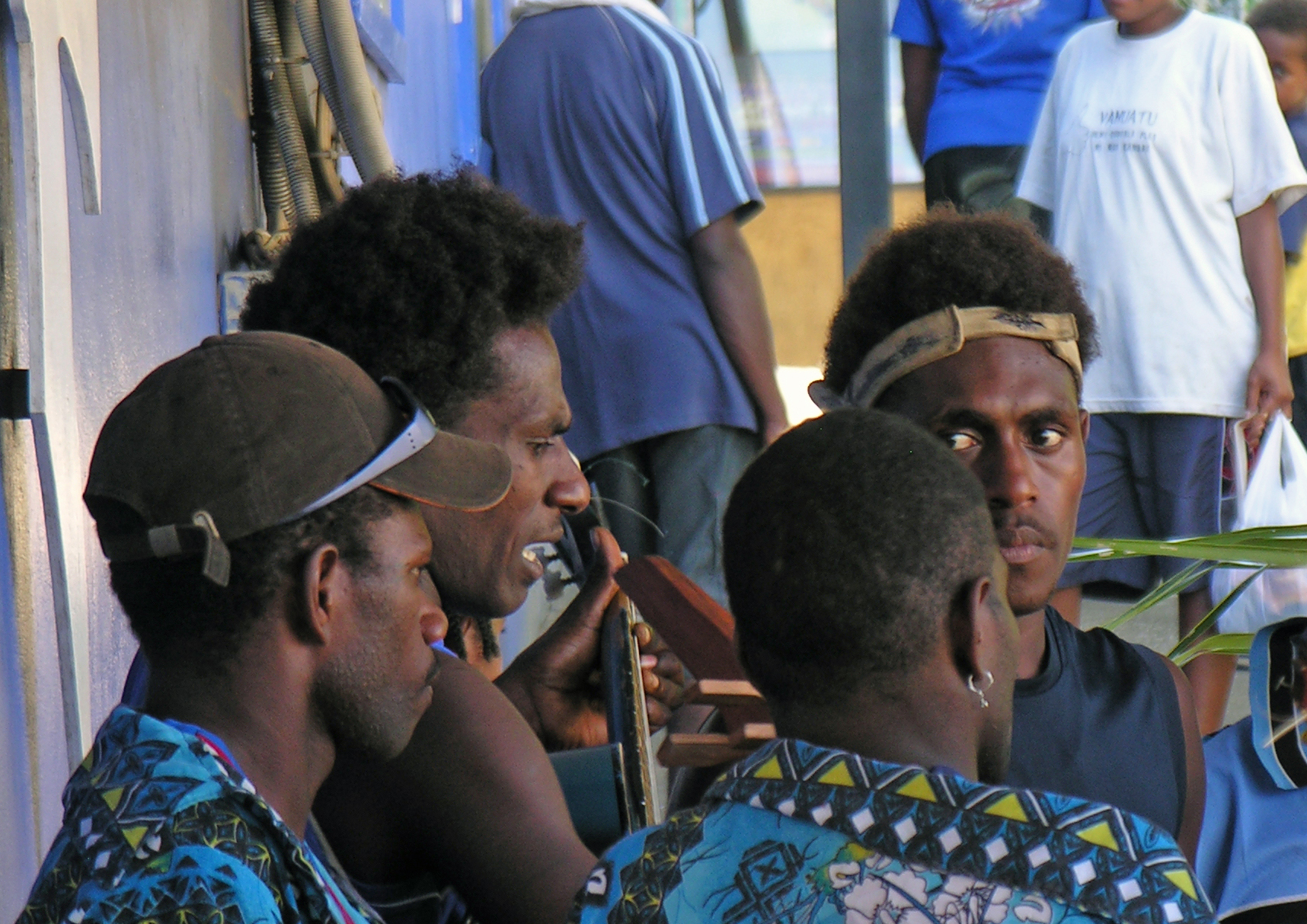
String band musicians performing in Port Vila.

Another musical genre that has become widely popular after World War II in all areas of Vanuatu, is known as string band music. It combines guitars, ukulele, bush bass and popular songs.

More recently the music of Vanuatu, as an industry, grew rapidly in the 1990s and several bands have forged a distinctive ni-Vanuatu identity. Popular genres of modern commercial music, which are currently being played in town include zouk music and reggaeton. Reggaeton, a variation of hip-hop rapped in Spanish, played alongside its own distinctive beat, is especially played in the local nightclubs of Vanuatu with mostly an audience of Westerners and tourists. Popular genres of modern commercial music, which are currently being played in town include zouk music and reggaeton.

== Literature ==
There are few prominent ni-Vanuatu authors. Women's rights activist Grace Mera Molisa, who died in 2002, achieved international notability as a very descriptive poet.

== Painting ==
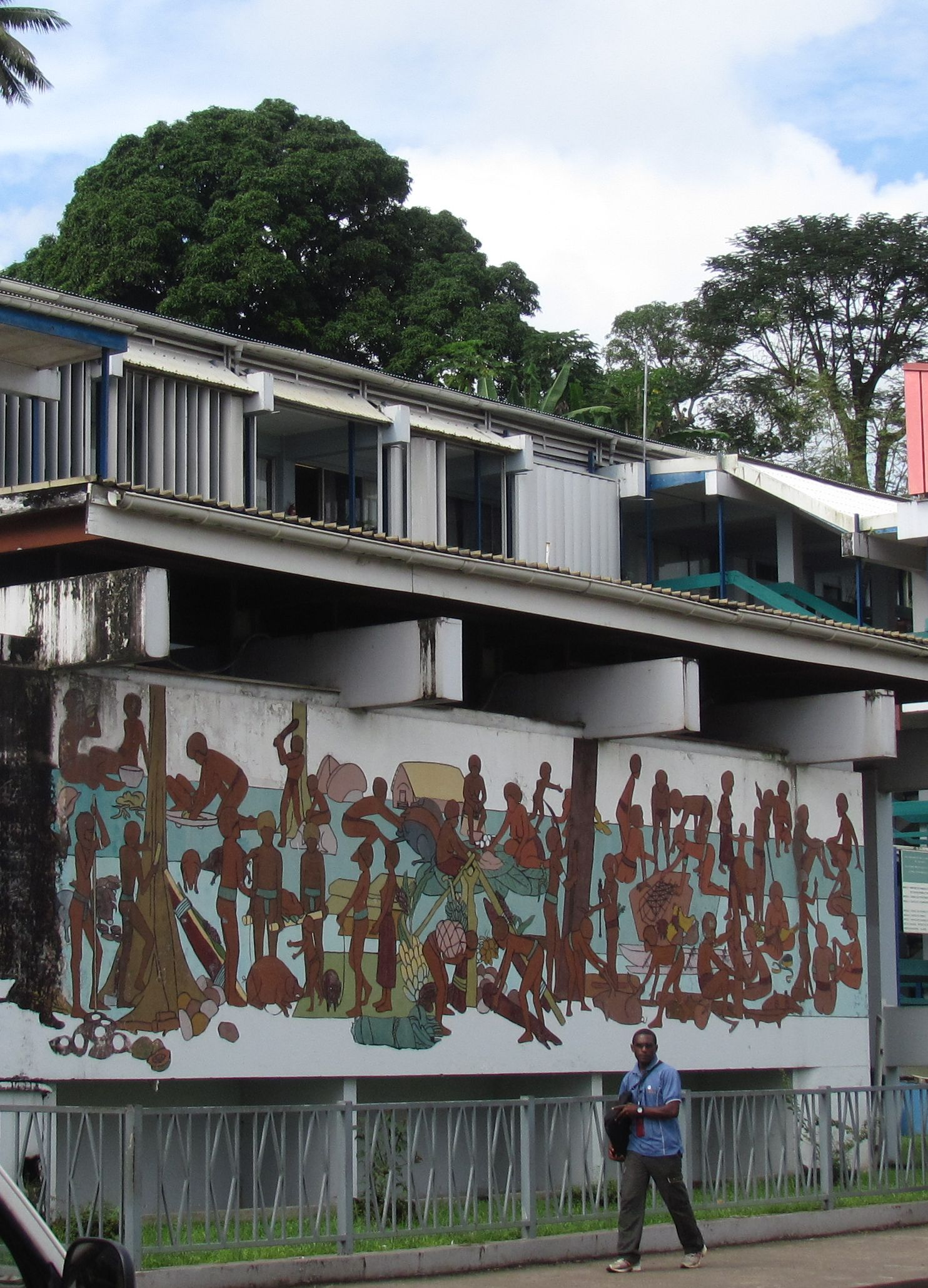
Wall painting opposite the market hall

Sand drawing from Vanuatu is an art form recognised by UNESCO as a Masterpiece of the Oral and Intangible Heritage of Humanity.

One of the most important contemporary artists of Vanuatu is Aloi Pilioko who created the impressive colourful relief on the post office in Port Vila. Another remarkable wall painting can be seen on the administration building opposite the market hall in Port Vila.

== Sport ==
Cricket is a very popular sport in Vanuatu. There are 8,000 registered cricketers. Sport varies depending on the gender of those involved. Volleyball is considered a girls' sport, while males play soccer and rugby union.

== Languages ==
There are three official languages: English, French, and Bislama. Bislama is a pidgin language, and now a creole in urban areas, which essentially combines a typically Melanesian grammar with a mostly English vocabulary. It is the only language that can be understood and spoken by the majority of Vanuatu's population as a second language. In addition 113 indigenous languages are still actively spoken in Vanuatu.

The density of languages per capita is the highest of any nation in the world, with an average of 2,000 speakers per language. All of these vernacular languages belong to the Oceanic branch of the Austronesian family.

== Religion ==
=== Traditional religion ===
Before Christianity, the indigenous religion of Vanuatu was inherited from Oceanian and Melanesian traditions. Missionaries often called this pre-Christian religion “pagan” or “heathen” in English, and as “times of darkness” in the country's local languages, or in Bislama (taem blong tudak).

The traditional religion, sometimes considered a form of animism, has been described by various authors, notably the Anglican missionary and anthropologist Robert Codrington in his famous 1891 monograph The Melanesians: Studies in Their Anthropology and Folk-lore (1891). He was followed by other scholars, including anthropologists and linguists.

Concepts central to the traditional religion include mana, tabu, and the worship of ancestral spirits (tamate). Named deities or mythological figures included Qat and Qasavara in the Banks Is, Tagaro on Ambae, Lisepsep across the archipelago.

Grade-taking ceremonies, which existed throughout Vanuatu, were associated with the indigenous religion, and with the transmission of mana.

Many aspects of the traditional religion have survived until today, in parallel with the adoption of Christianity, at least in some rural areas of Vanuatu.

=== Christianity ===
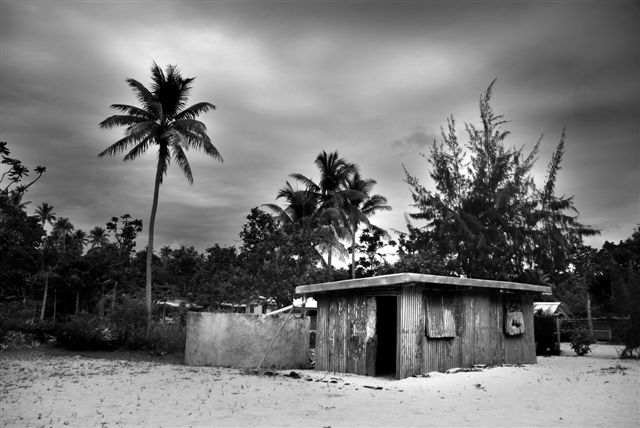
A church on Pele Island, Vanuatu.

Today, Christianity is the predominant religion in Vanuatu, consisting of several denominations. The Presbyterian Church, adhered to by about one third of the population, is the largest of them. Roman Catholic and Anglican are other common denominations, each claiming about 15% of the population.

Others are the Seventh-day Adventist Church, the Church of Christ, Neil Thomas Ministries (NTM), as well as many other religious sects and denominations.

=== Other religions ===
Because of the modernities that the military in World War II brought with them when they came to the islands, several cargo cults developed. Many died out, but the John Frum cult on Tanna is still large, and has adherents in the parliament.

Also on Tanna is the Prince Philip Movement, which reveres the United Kingdom's Prince Philip. Villagers of the Yaohnanen tribe believed in an ancient story about the pale-skinned son of a mountain spirit venturing across the seas to look for a powerful woman to marry. Prince Philip, having visited the island with his new wife Queen Elizabeth, fit the description exactly and is therefore revered and even held as a god around the isle of Tanna. On the island of Aneityum, the ancient religion consisted in the worship of Natmasses which were spirits represented in stones.

Islam in Vanuatu is made up of about 200 converts and growing fast. It was introduced by Hussein Nabanga who converted to Islam while training to be a Christian missionary.

== Cuisine ==
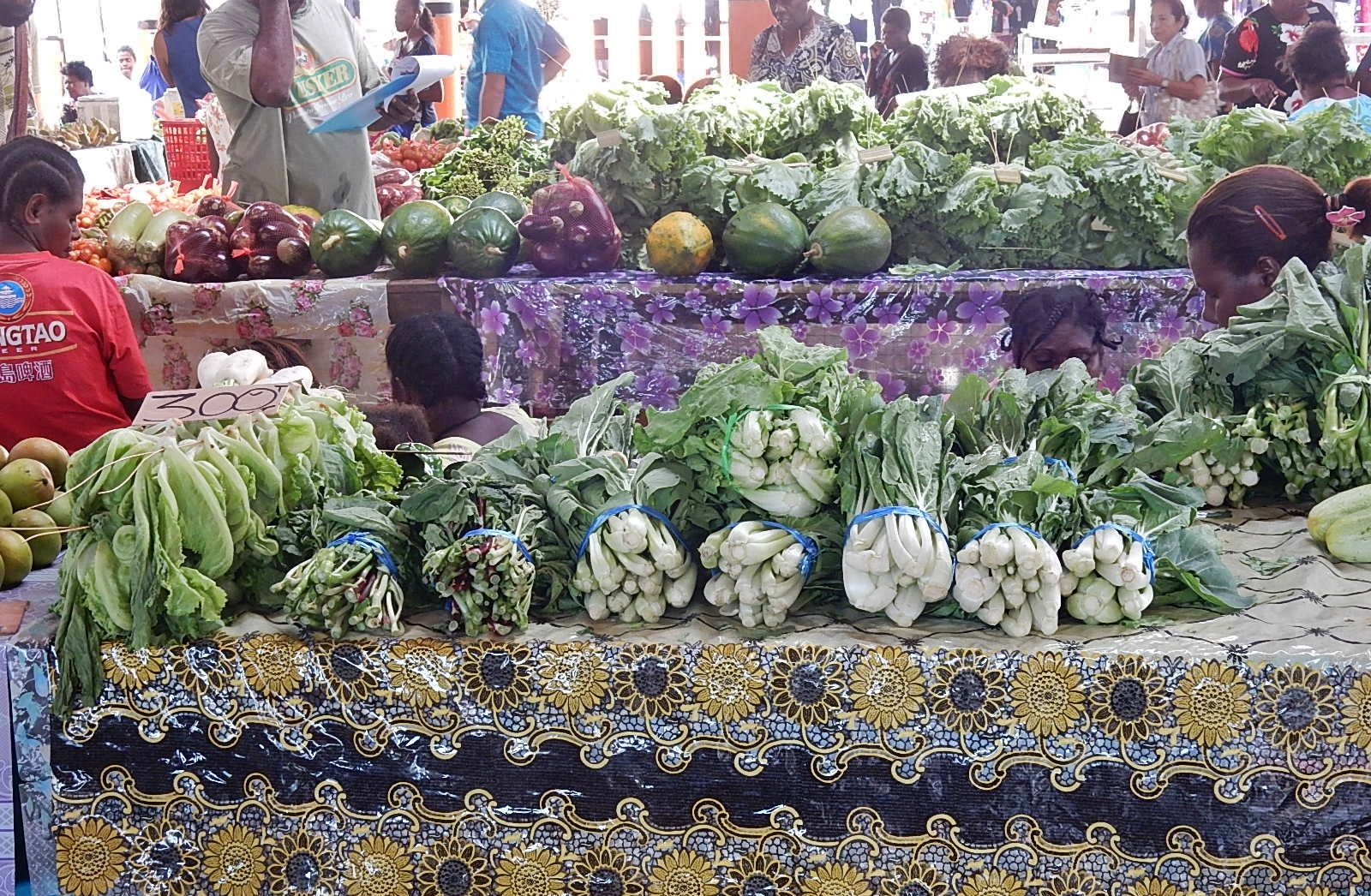
Market Display in Port-Vila, Shefa, Vanuatu in 2015

The cuisine of Vanuatu (aelan kakae) incorporates fish, root vegetables such as taro and yams, fruits, and vegetables. Most island families grow food in their gardens, and food shortages are rare. Papayas, pineapples, mangoes, plantains, and sweet potatoes are abundant through much of the year.

Coconut milk and coconut cream are used to flavor many dishes. Most food is cooked using hot stones or through boiling and steaming; very little food is fried.

== See also ==
- Vanuatu Cultural Centre
