= Demographics of Vanuatu =

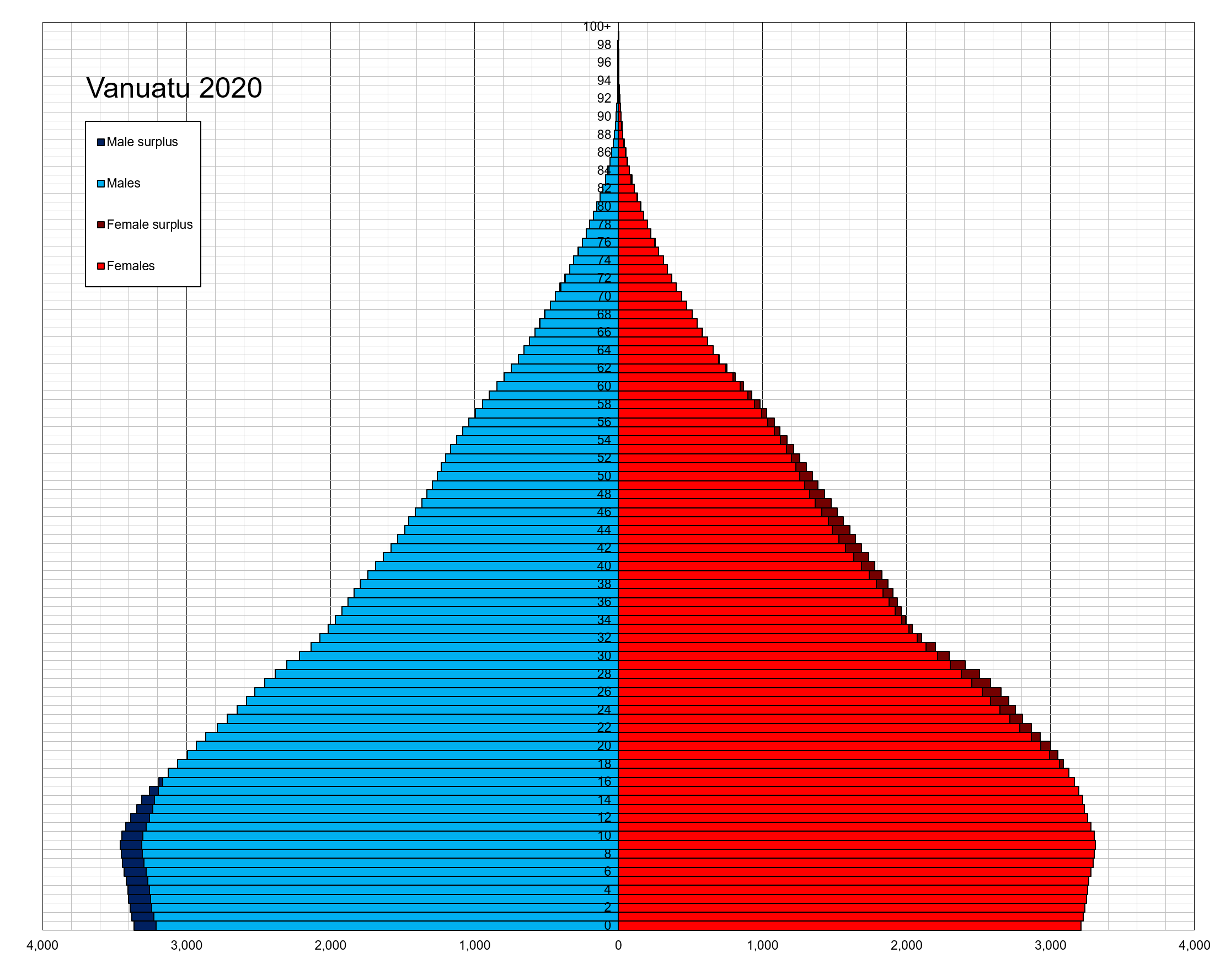
- Population pyramid of Vanuatu in 2020
- Population: 308,043 (2022 est.)
- Growth rate: 1.63% (2022 est.)
- Birth rate: 21.57 births/1,000 population
- Death rate: 3.98 deaths/1,000 population
- Life expectancy: 75.14 years
  - male: 73.45 years
  - female: 76.91 years
- Fertility rate: 2.66 children
- Infant mortality rate: 14.34 deaths/1,000 live births
- Net migration rate: -1.3 migrant(s)/1,000 population

Sex ratio
- Total: 0.99 male(s)/female (2022 est.)
- At birth: 1.05 male(s)/female

Nationality
- Nationality: Ni-Vanuatu
- Major ethnic: Melanesian - 99.2%

Demographic features of the population of Vanuatu include population density, ethnicity, education level, health of the populace, economic status, religious affiliations and other aspects. 4% of the people living in Vanuatu are Europeans.

== Population ==
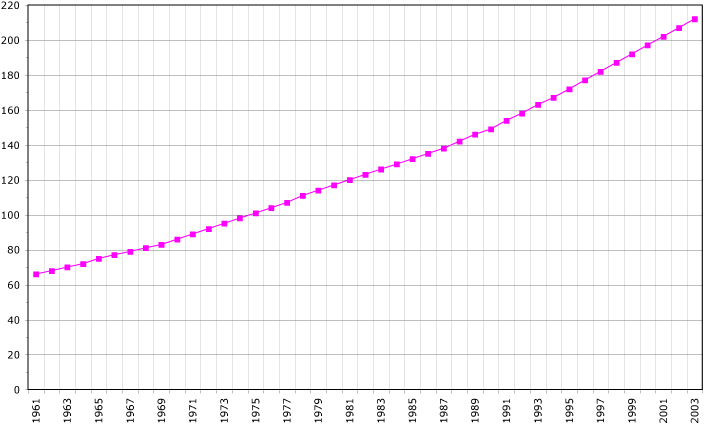
Vanuatu's population (1961–2003).

=== Structure of the population ===
Population by Sex and Age Group (Census 07.XI.2016) (Data is based on mini-census taken in 2016.):

Age group	Male	Female	Total	%
Total	138 265	134 194	272 459	100
0–4	20 172	18 764	38 936	14.29
5–9	19 276	17 872	37 148	13.63
10–14	15 560	14 286	29 846	10.95
15–19	13 207	12 695	25 902	9.51
20–24	11 738	13 124	24 862	9.13
25–29	10 986	12 045	23 031	8.45
30–34	8 909	9 158	18 067	6.63
35–39	8 148	8 085	16 233	5.96
40–44	6 726	6 525	13 251	4.86
45–49	6 125	5 708	11 833	4.34
50–54	4 756	4 573	9 329	3.42
55–59	3 792	3 435	7 227	2.65
60–64	2 832	2 525	5 357	1.97
65-69	2 089	1 921	4 010	1.47
70-74	1 521	1 266	2 787	1.02
75-79	1 069	840	1 909	0.70
80-84	516	533	1 049	0.39
85-89	407	406	813	0.30
90-94	120	129	249	0.09
95-99	90	104	194	0.07
100+	226	200	426	0.17
Age group	Male	Female	Total	Percent
0–14	55 008	50 922	105 930	38.88
15–64	77 108	77 782	154 890	56.85
65+	6 038	5 399	11 437	4.20
unknown	111	91	202	0.07

Population Estimates by Sex and Age Group (01.VII.2021) (Estimates based on the results of 2020 census.):

Age group	Male	Female	Total	%
Total	155 124	151 875	307 000	100
0–4	21 893	20 674	42 567	13.87
5–9	21 002	19 349	40 351	13.14
10–14	18 448	17 096	35 544	11.58
15–19	15 221	14 432	29 653	9.66
20–24	13 036	13 305	26 341	8.58
25–29	12 090	12 707	24 797	8.08
30–34	10 299	11 110	21 408	6.97
35–39	8 687	8 699	17 385	5.66
40–44	7 691	7 763	15 454	5.03
45–49	6 901	6 652	13 554	4.41
50–54	5 558	5 658	11 216	3.65
55–59	4 457	4 499	8 956	2.92
60–64	3 460	3 555	7 015	2.29
65-69	2 467	2 504	4 971	1.62
70-74	1 646	1 649	3 296	1.07
75-79	1 115	1 036	2 151	0.70
80-84	571	575	1 146	0.37
85-89	293	303	596	0.19
90-94	138	143	281	0.09
95-99	83	83	166	0.05
100+	70	84	154	0.05
Age group	Male	Female	Total	Percent
0–14	61 343	57 119	118 462	38.59
15–64	87 398	88 379	175 777	57.26
65+	6 383	6 377	12 760	4.16

== Vital statistics ==
=== Registered Births and deaths ===
Note: Birth and death registration incomplete in 2012–2014 period

Year	Population	Live births	Deaths	Natural increase	Crude birth rate	Crude death rate	Rate of natural increase	TFR
1967	77,988							6.6
1979	111,251							6.5
1989	142,419				38.0	9.1	28.9	5.3
1999	186,678	5,262			28.2			4.6
2009	234,023	7,335	1,260	6,075	31.3	5.4	25.9	4.1
2012		5,520	868	4,652				2.87
2013	264,652	5,994	764	5,230	22.7	2.9	19.8	2.87
2014		6,774	614	6,160				2.87

== Ethnic groups ==
- Ni-Vanuatu 97.6%
- Part Ni-Vanuatu 1.1%
- Other 1.3%

== Languages ==
First Language
Languages	Percentage
Local languages (more than 100)	63.2%
Bislama (official; creole)	33.7%
English (official)	2%
French (official)	0.6%
Other	0.5%

== Religions ==
- Protestant 70%
  - Presbyterian 27.9%
  - Anglican 15.1%
  - Seventh-day Adventist 12.5%
  - Assemblies of God 4.7%
  - Church of Christ 4.5%
  - Neil Thomas Ministry 3.1%
  - Apostolic 2.2%)
- Roman Catholic 12.4%,
- Customary beliefs 3.7%
  - Including Jon Frum cargo cult
- Other 12.6%
- None 1.1%
- Unspecified 0.2%
