= Mungau Dain =

Vanuatu actor

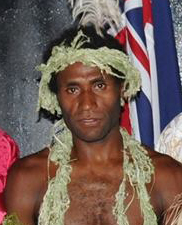
- Born: 1994; Yakel, Tanna island, Tafea Province, Vanuatu
- Died: 5 January 2019 (aged 24); Port Vila, Vanuatu
- Occupation: Actor
- Spouse: Nancy
- Children: 3

Mungau Dain (1994 – 5 January 2019) was a ni-Vanuatu actor and villager who starred in the 2015 Australian-Vanuatuan film, Tanna. Dain, who had never acted before, was cast in the film alongside Marie Wawa, another Yakel villager, and other local untrained actors. Tanna, which is based on the true story of a ni-Vanuatu couple in 1987 who committed suicide after their tribes refused to allow them to marry, won the Audience Award Pietro Barzisa at the 72nd Venice International Film Festival in 2015 and was nominated for a Best Foreign Language Film at the 89th Academy Awards in 2017. Dain, who reportedly had never seen a movie before his casting, traveled internationally in support of the film, including to Australia, Los Angeles and Venice.

== Biography ==
Dain was born in 1994 in the small village of Yakel on Tanna island, Tafea Province. The village, which had no electricity, is home to approximately 200 residents. Yakel, which is part of a sharing economy network consisting of several other Tanna villages, utilizes goods such as pigs, yams, and taro as its form of currency. According to Terry Adlington, the managing director of the Tanna Coffee Development Company, which works with Yakel residents, Dain was "a key participant in the everyday life of his village and the community at large."

=== Tanna ===
Australian directors Martin Butler and Bentley Dean developed the screenplay for their film Tanna in collaboration with Yakel's villagers and other local residents. The film is based on the true story of a ni-Vanuatu village couple who fell in love during the 1980s. In the movie, a young woman, Wawa (played by Marie Wawa), is destined for an arranged marriage as part of a peace deal with a warring tribe. However, Wawa falls in love with the grandson of her village chief, Dain (played by Mungau Dain). However, the couple's families would not allow them to marry and they committed suicide. The real-life events and themes of forbidden love bare similarities with Romeo and Juliet. The tragic suicides of the couple, as well as deaths of other young people in similar circumstances, led Yakel's and elders in other Tanna island communities to legalize love marriages. According to Jimmy Joseph Nako, an actor who became the film's translator and cultural director, the tragedy during the 1980s changed Tannese society, "It has changed our way of life and also secured it for the future, because young people were killing themselves."

To bring Tanna to life, Butler and Dean cast local first-time actors in the production. Yakel's residents nominated Mungau Dain for the lead role because they considered him to be the best looking man in the village. Bentley Dean, the film's co-director, explained that "It wasn't a case of me casting him it was the community casting him...We all thought he'd be great for the role because he had an energy to him and he was definitely the best looking guy in town." However, Dain, who is believed to have never seen a film and had no acting experience, was initially apprehensive about his role and resisted his casting. Dain knew the importance of the love story and its history for his village. Bentley remembered, "The problem [for Dain] was that he didn't want to do it. He knew the story, he knew that he would have to play a love interest and he had a wife and he was quite shy. It actually took the chiefs to be a bit stern with him and say 'you have to do this for the tribe', and as soon as he got that word he took it up with interest and professionalism and he really worked hard." According to Butler, the film's other co-director, "The whole process of acting was something that he had not thought about...I don't think at that stage he had seen a movie." Dain proved to be a quick study, who quickly improved due to patience and practice. He eventually delivered a compelling, well-acted performance which won praise from both the directors and film critics. "He kept on improving and improving and by the end he could play any role that he chose. If he did decide to go into the movie business he'd have had no problem," said Dean. Marie Wawa was selected to star opposite Dain as his love interest.

Dain, Wawa, and the film's other ni-Vanuatu traveled throughout the world to promote the film. Dain appeared at the 2015 Venice International Film Festival wearing traditional Tannese clothing. While in Venice, Dain praised the city during an interview, saying, "This is such a good place, with many buildings, many cars, many people — it's such a good place," while praising his home village in Vanuatu, "my life here is not as good as my life back at home."

In 2017, following Tanna's Academy Award nomination for Best Foreign Language Film, Dain said he never imagined that the film would make it as far as Port Vila, let alone Hollywood. Dain, Marie Wawa, and two other Tannese stars of the film traveled to Los Angeles to attend the 89th Academy Awards on February 26, 2017.

Following the film, Dain began meeting with an acting group in Port Vila to continue in the profession.

=== Death ===
In December 2018, Dain and his friend, Tanna co-star Lingai Kowai, traveled to Port Vila to seek work as seasonal fruit pickers in either Australia or New Zealand. While in the capital, Dain suffered a cut on his leg in an accident on New Year's Eve (December 31). He quickly developed an infection in his leg, which went untreated and led to sepsis. By the time he was taken to the hospital, he was unconscious from septic shock. He died from the infection five days later at Vila Central Hospital in Port Vila on 5 January 2019.

Bentley Dean, the co-director of Tanna and friend of Dain, said that his death could have been prevented with antibiotics. Dean told Radio New Zealand, "It was an accident, certainly nothing life threatening and that's become infected," and added, "You'd have to say it probably wouldn't have happened if he had have got earlier medical attention. That's one of the things that when we go back, we just want to talk about ways in which you can prevent this sort of tragedy from happening again because it is preventable."

Dain's body was flown from Port Vila to Whitegrass Airport on Tanna on 6 January 2019. The cargo plane carrying his coffin was met in Tanna by a number of dignitaries, including Deputy Prime Minister Bob Loughman, Minister of Internal Affairs Andrew Napuat, Parliamentary Secretary Johnny Koanapo, MP Nakou Natuman and the President of Tafea Province Jefferey Kauh. A large number of Tanna residents gathered to meet the coffin and plane as well. His death led to tributes across social media.

The village of Yakel observed a traditional two week period of mourning following Dain's death. Dain was survived by his wife, Nancy, and their three children - a daughter and two sons. One of their sons, Martin, was named in honor of the co-director of Tanna, Martin Butler.

Martin Butler, co-director of Tanna, said; “He was a great example of how you can live a totally different type of life, and still be completely happy.”
