= Tanna (film) =

2015 film by Bentley Dean, Martin Butler

- Film poster
- Directed by: Martin Butler; Bentley Dean
- Screenplay by: Martin Butler; Bentley Dean; John Collee
- Produced by: Carolyn Johnson; Bentley Dean; Martin Butler
- Starring: Marie Wawa; Mungau Dain
- Cinematography: Bentley Dean
- Edited by: Tania Nehme
- Music by: Antony Partos
- Distributed by: Lightyear Entertainment
- Release date: 7 September 2015 (Venice)
- Running time: 100 minutes
- Countries: Australia; Vanuatu
- Language: Southwest Tanna
- Box office: $69,961

Tanna is a 2015 Australian-Ni-Vanuatu drama film directed by Bentley Dean and Martin Butler. Set on the island of Tanna in Vanuatu, the film dramatizes the true story of Wawa (Marie Wawa) and Dain (Mungau Dain), members of the Indigenous Kastom tribe, who defy their community's tradition of arranged marriage by pursuing a forbidden romance, igniting tensions with the rival Imedin tribe. Notable as the first feature film shot entirely in Vanuatu, it features a cast of non-professional actors from the Yakel tribe, including Dain, who was cast for his status as the village's "most handsome man." The dialogue is delivered in the local Nivhaal and Nafe languages.

Premiering at the 72nd Venice International Film Festival, Tanna won the Audience Award Pietro Barzisa and earned Dean a prize for Best Cinematography. It was nominated for Best Foreign Language Film at the 89th Academy Awards, marking Australia's and Vanuatu's first-ever nomination in the category.

== Plot ==
On the island of Tanna, people following the Kastom have always enforced arranged marriages. The people of Kastom Road face sporadic conflicts with the Imedin tribe, while two followers of Kastom, Dain and Wawa, continue a secret love affair. Wawa's young sister Selin is impudent, stealing a penis sheath and running into the wilderness, berated for entering the forbidden zone where the Imedin once massacred their people. To teach Selin respect, her grandfather, who is also the tribe's shaman, takes her to the spiritual site of Yahul and the volcanoes. There, the Imedin attack the shaman, clubbing him, leaving him mortally wounded. Selin escapes and runs back to her people, who retrieve the shaman, afraid that his inevitable death will leave them vulnerable. The Imedin are summoned to the village to make peace. They trade pigs, which the shaman's murderers club to death just as they had the shaman, and Wawa is promised for marriage into the Imedin tribe.

Despite the arranged marriage, Wawa and Dain continue their affair. The elders learn of this and plead with Wawa to give up the relationship. The elder women sympathize with Wawa for having to go through an arranged marriage but tell her that respect for her elders and the law will lead to happiness. Her peers also tell Wawa that she is not the only one whose interests are at stake. If the Imedin lose Wawa as a promised bride, they will likely seek revenge. Wawa reveals that she has already had sex with Dain, meaning she will be unacceptable to the Imedin anyway. Disgraced, Dain is exiled from the village. The elders continue to urge Wawa to accept her arranged marriage, pointing to Prince Philip to prove that arranged marriage means love.

Wawa joins Dain in the wilderness and hides on the side of the volcano while their people and the Imedin both search for them. The two eat poison mushrooms. Their people bury them, and the elders agree that recognition of love marriage must be added to the Kastom to keep their culture alive.

== Production ==
The film was shot entirely on location in and around the village of Yakel on Tanna Island. Co-director Bentley Dean lived with his family for seven months in Tanna. Most of the cast played their own roles in the film, (Note: According to Jimmy Joseph Nako, the film’s cultural director: "The chief played the chief, the medicine man played the medicine man, the warriors played the warriors.") and Dain was cast because he was considered the village's most handsome man. The film's dialogue is shot in the Southwest Tanna (Nivhaal dialect) and Nafe (Kwamera, South Tanna) languages, which are used in Yakel. The cast members did not regard the filming as being difficult because their roles were "performing what we were used to in our daily life." A copy of Ten Canoes was screened as an example for the actors.

This is Martin Butler and Dean's third collaboration, after the documentaries Contact and First Footprints. Dean came to Vanuatu in 2003 to research a story on the John Frum movement for Dateline and wanted to return there to create something larger. Dean wanted to tell a local story and give his children a chance to live in the village, and developed the storyline in collaboration with the Yakel people.

== Cast ==
- Marie Wawa as Wawa
- Mungau Dain as Dain
- Marceline Rofit as Selin
- Charlie Kahla as Chief Charlie
- Lingai Kowia as Father
- Linette Yowayin as Mother
- Albi Nangia as Grandfather and Shaman
- Dadwa Mungau as Grandmother

Actor Mungau Dain died in January 2019, aged 24, due to sepsis following a leg injury. He was married and had three children.

== Screening ==
Just after Cyclone Pam, a special screening was held for the tribe. The film has screened at the 72nd Venice International Film Festival, where it won the Audience Award Pietro Barzisa, and Bentley Dean was awarded Best Cinematographer, at the BFI London Film Festival, and at the 2015 Adelaide Film Festival.

== Reception ==
Tanna has received critical acclaim. Tanna has an approval rating of 92% on review aggregator website Rotten Tomatoes, based on 39 reviews, and an average rating of 7.46/10. The website's critical consensus states: "Powerful visuals, naturalistic performances, and economic filmmaking combine to bring added resonance to Tanna's impactful story and fresh cultural perspective. It has a score of 75% on Metacritic, based on 11 critics, indicating "generally favorable reviews".

Kenneth Turan declared Tanna to be one of the best films about a South Pacific people. The Guardian critic Luke Buckmaster gave it four stars, and credited the novice actors as "magnetic" and praised the cinematography, saying, "Tanna has a warm, shimmering vitality. Like the trees and the birds, the frame feels alive". Variety's Richard Kuipers highlighted the aesthetics of the setting and shots, declaring "Visuals of lush forests, pristine beaches and barren black earth surrounding the volcano are beautiful without ever looking like a travelogue". In The Washington Post, Stephanie Merry wrote the story was uncomplicated but the setting was spectacular, remarking "There’s something thrilling about a movie that introduces us to a corner of the world we never knew existed". For The Globe and Mail, Brad Wheeler compared it to Romeo and Juliet and declared "Emotional notes are hit neatly and refreshingly".

Glenn Kenny wrote a negative review in The New York Times, concluding, "Despite its best efforts, Tanna drifts into a mode of exoticism that renders it an ultimately frustrating experience".

=== Accolades ===
Award	Category	Recipient(s)	Result	Ref(s)
AACTA Awards (6th)	Best Film	Martin Butler, Bentley Dean and Carolyn Johnson	Nominated	
AACTA Awards (6th)	Best Direction	Martin Butler and Bentley Dean	Nominated	
AACTA Awards (6th)	Best Cinematography	Bentley Dean	Nominated	
AACTA Awards (6th)	Best Original Music Score	Antony Partos	Won	
AACTA Awards (6th)	Best Sound	James Ashton, Emma Bortignon and Martin Butler	Nominated	
Academy Award	Best Foreign Language Film	Martin Butler and Bentley Dean	Nominated	
African-American Film Critics Association	Best Foreign Film	Martin Butler and Bentley Dean	Won	
ASE Award	Best Editing in a Feature Film	Tania Nehme	Won	
FCCA Awards	Best Film	Martin Butler, Bentley Dean and Carolyn Johnson	Nominated	
FCCA Awards	Best Music	Antony Partos	Won	
FCCA Awards	Best Cinematography	Bentley Dean	Nominated	
FCCA Awards	Best Editor	Tania Nehme	Nominated	

== See also ==
- Kastom
- Love marriage
- List of submissions to the 89th Academy Awards for Best Foreign Language Film
- List of Australian submissions for the Academy Award for Best Foreign Language Film
