= Vanuatu National Library =

National library

Coordinates: 17.7452°S 168.3175°E

Vanuatu National Library

The Vanuatu National Library (in Bislama Vanuatu Nasonal Laebri, in French Bibliotheque Nationale du Vanuatu) was established in April 2004 and is located within the Vanuatu Cultural Centre in Port Vila, it contains more than 30,000 books and serves both as a national repository for "rare and special" materials. The National Library also has responsibility for the Port Vila public library.

== History ==
In 1955, the British and French administrations in Vanuatu decided to set up a Cultural Centre to commemorate the 50th anniversary of the signing of the Anglo-French Convention of 1906. The cultural centre, which was officially opened in 1962 on the main street, contained a library, meeting room and museum.

After Independence in 1980, the Port Vila Public Library came to be described as the National Library, where a small collection was kept on the history of Vanuatu. By 2004, the Vanuatu Cultural Centre Library served two distinct function - as a public lending library, and as a national depository library, and so the National Library of Vanuatu was established in its own location within the Vanuatu Cultural Centre Complex.

In September 2007, the National Library took responsibility for the security, preservation and development of the National Archives.

In November 2013, the library relocated to a new two-story building, along with the Vanuatu National Archives, as part of a new Vanuatu Cultural Centre complex.

== Collections ==
The Library possesses two "special collections", one devoted to Vanuatu and the other to other parts of the Pacific, as well as a general collection. It holds "some 500 rare items" about Vanuatu, primarily a collection of rare books. Its "rare and special" items include "anthropological and archaeological materials, art and arts references, autobiographical records and biographies, a large section of works on the languages of Vanuatu, mission histories, oral traditions, cultural, historical and political records, journals, newspapers and periodicals".

Nelly Caleb current serves as Chief Librarian.
