= Prince Philip movement =

Religious sect followed by Kastom people in Vanuatu

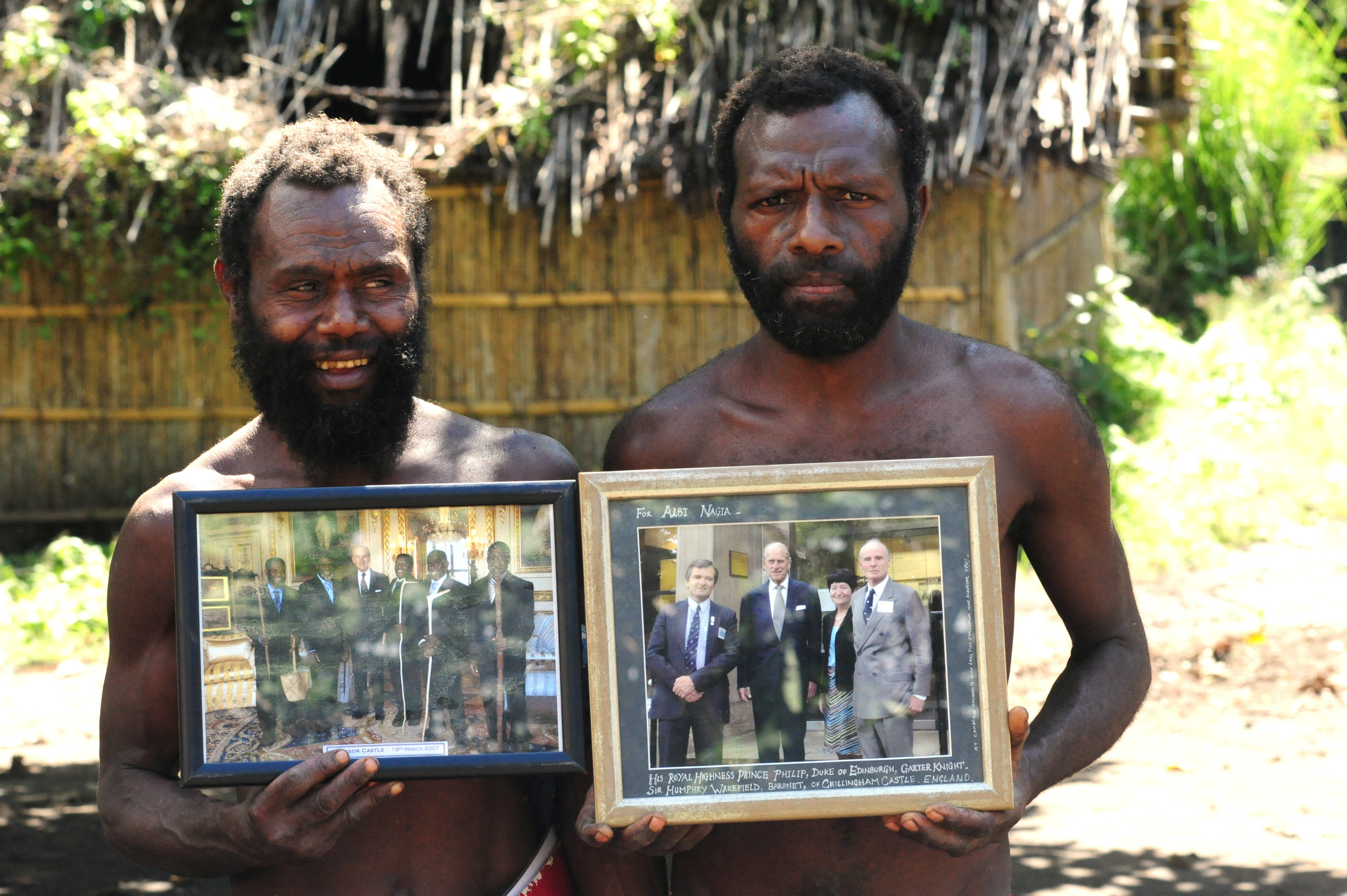
Yaohnanen people in 2012, showing pictures of the 2007 visit by Prince Philip

The Prince Philip movement is a religious sect followed by the Kastom people around the villages of Yaohnanen and Yakel on the southern Tanna Island in Vanuatu. It is a cargo cult of the Yaohnanen tribe, who believe in the divinity of Prince Philip, Duke of Edinburgh (1921–2021), consort to Queen Elizabeth II (1926–2022).

== Origins ==
According to ancient Yaohnanen tales, there was a son of a mountain spirit, who then travelled to a distant land. There, he married a powerful lady. One day, he would return. He was sometimes said to be a brother to John Frum.

The people of the Yaohnanen and Takel area had seen the respect accorded to Queen Elizabeth II by the colonial officials and concluded that her husband, Prince Philip, must be the son referred to in their legends, and the "distant land" refers to Britain.

It is unclear just when this belief came about, but it was probably some time in the 1950s or 1960s. It was strengthened by the royal couple's official visit to Vanuatu in 1974, when a few villagers had the opportunity to actually see Prince Philip from a distance. The Prince was not then aware of the sect, but it was brought to his attention several years later by John Champion, the British Resident Commissioner in the New Hebrides.

== Interactions with Prince Philip ==
Champion suggested that Prince Philip send them a portrait of himself. He agreed and sent a signed official photograph. The villagers responded by sending him a traditional pig-killing club called a nal-nal. In compliance with their request, the Prince sent a photograph of himself posing with the club. Another photograph was sent in 2000. All three photographs were kept by Chief Jack Naiva, who died in 2009.

Anne, Princess Royal, visited Tanna in October 2014. She had visited Vanuatu in 1974, but had not previously travelled to the island. Charles III, then Prince of Wales, visited the island in 2018.

On 27 September 2007, Channel 4 broadcast Meet the Natives, a reality show about five Tanna men from the Prince Philip Movement on a visit to Britain. Their trip culminated in an off-screen audience with Philip, where gifts were exchanged, including a new photograph of the Prince.

The sect celebrated the 2018 wedding of Prince Harry and Meghan Markle by holding a party, where they hoisted the Union Jack, danced, and ate pigs. The villagers were initially unaware of the wedding, until a travel agent for the island, who was contacted by The Times, relayed the message.

== Reaction to Prince Philip's death ==
In April 2021, the sect mourned Prince Philip's death. Village Chief Albi said that he was "terribly, terribly sorry" and tribal leader Chief Yapa sent his condolences to the Royal Family. The Union Flag was flown at half staff on the grounds of the nakamal. Referring to the Queen, Chief Jack Malia said though the Duke is dead, they still have a connection with the "mother" of the royal family.

Kirk Huffman, an anthropologist familiar with the group, said that after their period of mourning the group would probably transfer their veneration to Prince Charles (now King Charles III), who had visited Vanuatu in 2018 and met with some of the tribal leaders.

== Media coverage ==
- In 2010, Australian journalist Amos Roberts visited Tanna and reported on the locals' celebration of Philip's 89th birthday, for SBS's magazine program Dateline.
- In 2011, the people of Yaohnanen village were featured in an episode of the second series of An Idiot Abroad with Karl Pilkington.
- In 2013, Man Belong Mrs Queen, a book by British writer Matthew Baylis, investigated the historical and anthropological origins of the movement and provided an account of the author's own stay on the island of Tanna.
- Kate Humble talks to locals about the movement in Kate Humble: Into the Volcano, a TV documentary about Mount Yasur broadcast on BBC Two in January 2015.
- In 2018, the Australian podcast Zealot documented the Prince Philip Movement in episode 13.
- The six-part 2018 TV documentary, The Pacific: In the Wake of Captain Cook with Sam Neill, included a segment featuring the Prince Philip movement.
- In April 2021, an episode of the BBC World Service podcast Heart and Soul titled "Prince belong Vanuatu" covered the group's belief that Prince Philip was returning to his ancestral home on their Pacific island in spirit form.
- English actor Martin Clunes visited the village of Yakel on the island of Tanna, Vanuatu, as part of the second episode of the 2022 documentary series Martin Clunes: Islands of the Pacific, and documented the villagers' belief in the divinity of Prince Philip.
