= Marie Wawa =

Vanuatu actress

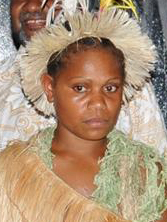
- Occupation: Actress

Marie Wawa is a ni-Vanuatu actress and villager who starred in the 2015 Australian-Vanuatuan film, Tanna. The film, which was the first to be shot entirely in Vanuatu, won two major prizes at the 2015 Venice Film Festival and was nominated for a Best Foreign Language Film at the 89th Academy Awards in 2017. Wawa appears in the lead role opposite Mungau Dain as two star-crossed lovers.

Wawa is from the interior village of Yakel on Tanna island, Tafea Province, in southern Vanuatu.

Wawa, like the rest of the cast of Tanna, was a novice, first-time actress with no experience prior to her casting. The film, a story of real-life forbidden love and tragedy, was shot on location around Yakel. Wawa was cast in the lead role of Wawa, a young girl who is betrothed in an arranged marriage as part of a peace deal with another tribe. However, she falls in love with the grandson of her chief, played by Mungau Dain. Their families refuse to allow the couple to marry. The couple flee and eventually commit suicide, mirroring the true real-life tragedy of a Tannese couple in 1987. The tragic circumstances led the elders to legalize love marriages.

In September 2015, Wawa traveled to Venice with Tanna's three other lead actors to attend its world premiere at the 2015 Venice Film Festival. Wawa also attended the 89th Academy Awards in Los Angeles on February 26, 2017, where Tanna had been nominated for Best Foreign Language Film.
