= Mythology of Oceania =

Overview of traditional myths and belief systems across Oceania

The Mythology of Oceania and the Gods of the Pacific region are both complex and diverse topics. The stories developed over many centuries on each of the islands that make up Oceania. While some gods are shared between many groups of islands, others are specific to one set of islands or even to a single island. Their exact roles are often overlapping, as one god can appear in different places under different names. A god may also appear in many different forms.

Oceania is a general name applied to a very vast region including Polynesia, Micronesia, Australia, Tasmania and more. Even among these groups (ex. Polynesia), there are still many different societies and tribes with their own cultures. This list is not a complete list of mythologies, just a collection of the more well known beliefs in different regions.

== Polynesia ==
The most well-known and perhaps most widely believed creation myth in Polynesia starts with Po. Po is a darkness void of all light and life. At some point, stirrings began within Po, and then a light began to shine until eventually day was created. After day came the Heaven Father and Earth Mother, named Rangi and Papa. Rangi took Papa and the gods were born. There are various versions of this myth among the cultures of Polynesia, but many agree that the first gods came from them. However, some versions suggest that Rangi took several more wives to create additional gods who then created all that is on Earth.

One shared concept among many Oceanian cultures is the belief in ghosts. There are three main categories of ghosts: good, rambling, and malevolent. Malevolent ghosts are the most common, and these ghosts bring ruin to anyone they mean, regardless of if they are family. A common story among several islands is that the spirit of infants are manifested in dolphins, often identified by them playing all day.

=== Maui ===
Maui is one of the most well- known and frequently discussed demi-gods in Polynesian mythology. While Maui is not the creator, he is attributed with providing humanity much of what was needed to survive and thrive, such as fire and new islands that he had fished from the sea.

== Australia ==
Very little is known about the beliefs of the Aboriginal peoples of Australia regarding the creation of the Earth. While there have been vague mentions of everything being created by a deity or supernatural being, there is little information on the identity of this being or how important they are to the tribes. What we do find in Aboriginal mythology is many stories about native animals such as pelicans and kangaroos, and how they came to be. One story involves an extramarital affair; a woman named Narina lay with Kilpuruna, who was the friend of her husband Yuruma. Yuruma discovered their affair and pushed Kilpuruna from a tall tree. The fall was devastating enough that Kilpuruna was flattened and transformed into a blanket lizard, while Yuruma became an Eagle forever hunting lizards. Narina transformed into a cockatoo and flew from place to place, crying for her lost lover.

Another myth explains the creation of the moon and the sun. In the beginning, there was no light and the people had to search for food in the darkness and eat it raw. Purukupali, believed to be the first man created, and his friend Japra, decided one day to rub two sticks together and a fire started. Purukupali knew that this fire was going to help the people, so he gave one torch to Japra and one torch to his sister Wuriupranala, and told them to keep the torches lit no matter what. Japra and Wuriupranala became the moon-man and sun-woman, forever walking across the sky to keep the Aboriginals from ever falling into darkness again.

== Micronesia ==
Micronesia makes up more than 2,000 Pacific Islands in relation to Hawaii and the Philippines. Each island has its own world of low coral atolls, and the people Indigenous to those regions used them for their benefits. Established trading networks developed over the years through the western edge of those islands, bringing a way of life for the islanders. Some of the lands in those areas include Palau, Guam, the Northern Mariana Islands, the Federal States of Micronesia, and many more.

The Mariana Islands became colonized in 1668 by a Portuguese explorer named Ferdinand Magellan; this act of colonization was the first in the area, and soon after, Spain colonized the entire island chain. However, this wasn’t without repercussions. The Chamorro people (native to the Marianas) fought back against the Spanish. This turned into a decades long conflict that ultimately ended with the mass-killing of the Chamorro people, turning the population from 100,000 to 4,000.

Over the years, more fights for ownership of the Micronesian islands spread far and wide. Various places were taken under European control, Native peoples were displaced, and more violence ensued. It was only in the 1960s when the effort for decolonization began; the island of Nauru was the first to break free.

Throughout all of the battles and conflicts many native languages, stories, myths, and cultures prevailed in the face of adversity. The people of Micronesia continued to believe in their gods and stories, such as the various creator-gods. One of note is the creator-god Loa, who reigns over the Marshall Islands. It is said that the first man and woman, Wulleb and Limdunanij, came from his leg.

Micronesia is similar to Australia in that it lacks detailed creations and instead focuses on smaller stories such as the sun, moon, and certain cultural practices.

One such story is about the theft of the moon. A chief asks all the people in his tribe to bring him the moon, and says that whoever brings it to him can marry his daughter. A poor boy who finds out how to steal the moon brings it to chief, except the moon is wrapped in covers. The boy tells the chief not to remove the covers and then takes the chief's daughter to marry. The chief doesn't listen to the boy and removes the covers, and as he takes off each one, the moon gets brighter and brighter until finally, he removes the last cover and the moon becomes unbearably bright and shoots back into the sky. The chief goes to the boy to tell him what happened and asks the boy to retrieve the moon again, but the boy says it is not possible and suggests they leave the moon in the sky for all to see.

Another story explains the abundance of fresh water on the Island of East Fayu. There was a ghost from Onari that went in search of water, as many Micronesian islands lack fresh water. The ghost found some and decided to carry it back to Onari in his mouth. Along the way, he saw a celebration happening on the Island of East Fayu. A young woman invited the ghost to the celebration but quickly noticed he refused to open his mouth, which meant he was hiding something important. She snuck up behind the ghost and tickled him, causing the ghost to laugh and spill the water. Since then, fresh water has been found on East Fayu by digging wells. The water is so pure that it does not require boiling like much of the water on the surrounding islands.
