= Yaohnanen =

Yaohnanen Ionhanen
- Village
- Location in Vanuatu
- Coordinates: 19°33′S 169°20′E
- Country: Vanuatu
- Province: Tafea Province
- Island: Tanna
- Time zone: UTC+11 (VUT)

Yaohnanen, also spelled Ionhanen, is a village located on the island of Tanna in Vanuatu, at about 6 km south-east of the island main town, Lenakel.

It is well known for the participation of its villagers in the Prince Philip movement.

Yaohnanen people were featured on the second season of the Spanish television series Perdidos en la Tribu (Lost in the Tribe), in which they lived with a Spanish family during the course of 21 days, teaching them their customs and culture, and also in the first season of the same Portuguese series called Perdidos na Tribo.

== Gallery ==
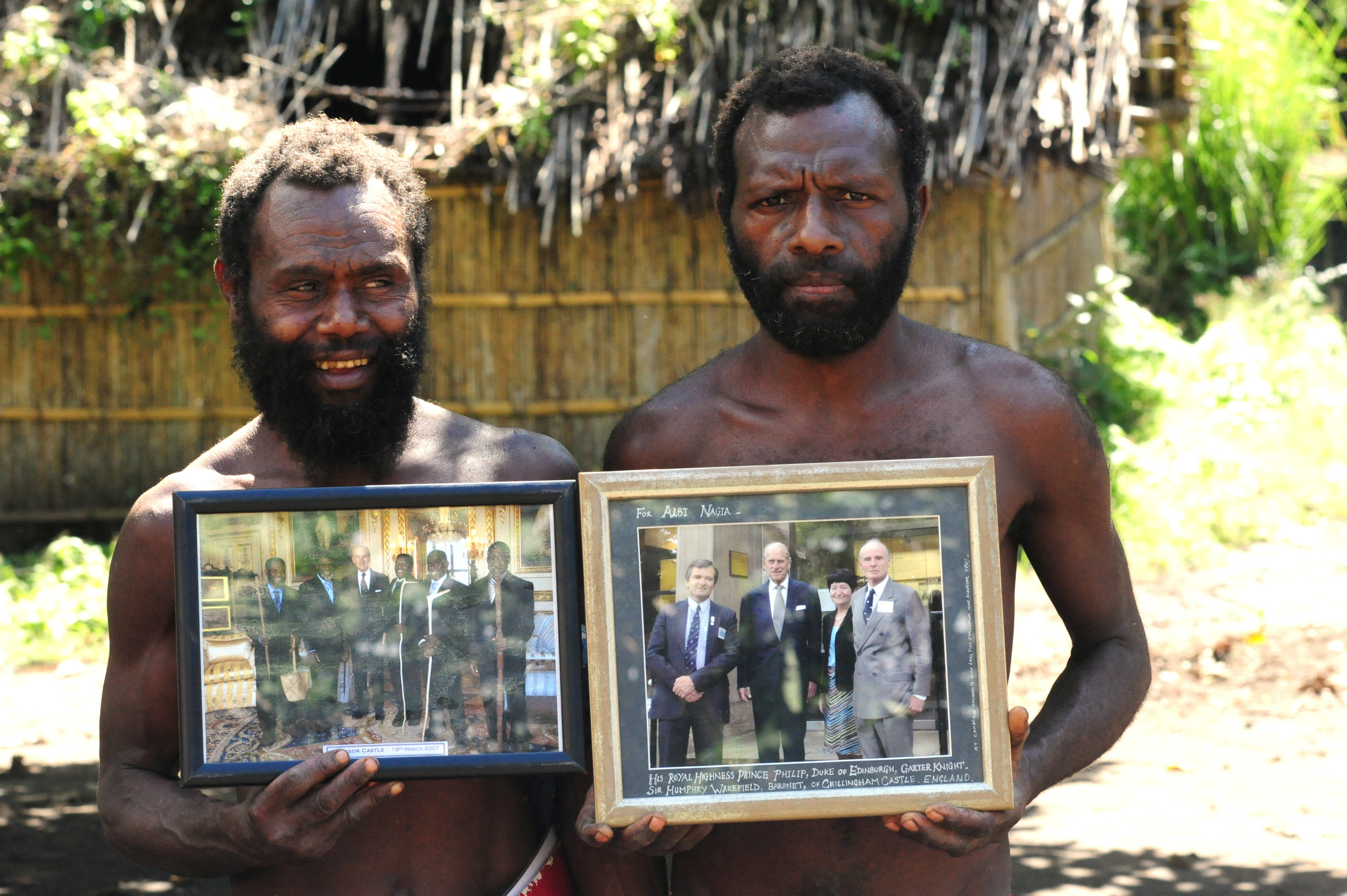
Yaohnanen tribesmen (Alpi and Nakou a.k.a. J.J.) show their photos Prince Philip, Duke of Edinburgh, taken during their visit in Windsor (UK) in 2007.
On the left photo Alpi is standing first on the left, Nakou is fourth from the left (next to Prince Philip).

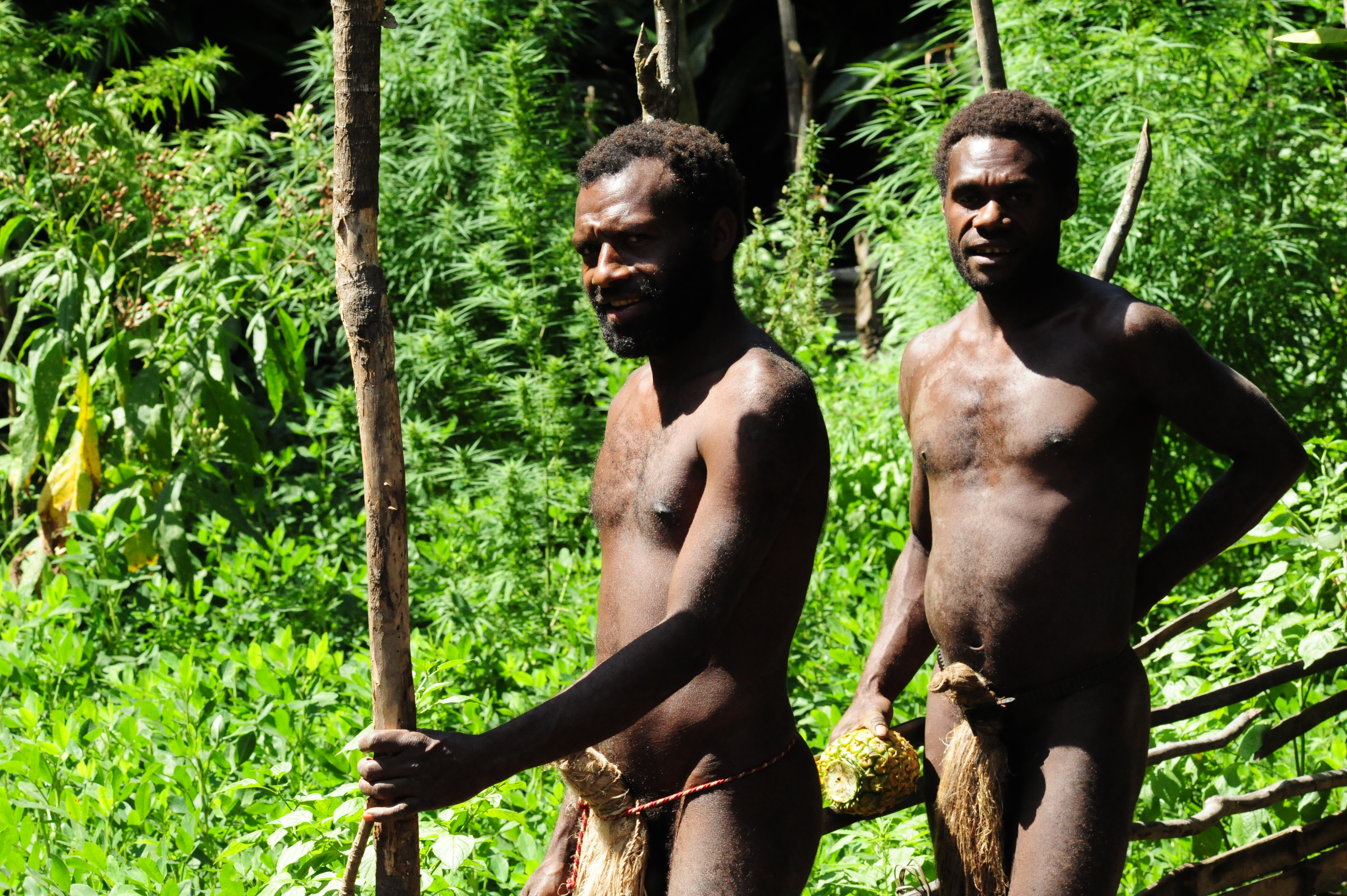
Two Yaohnanen tribesmen.

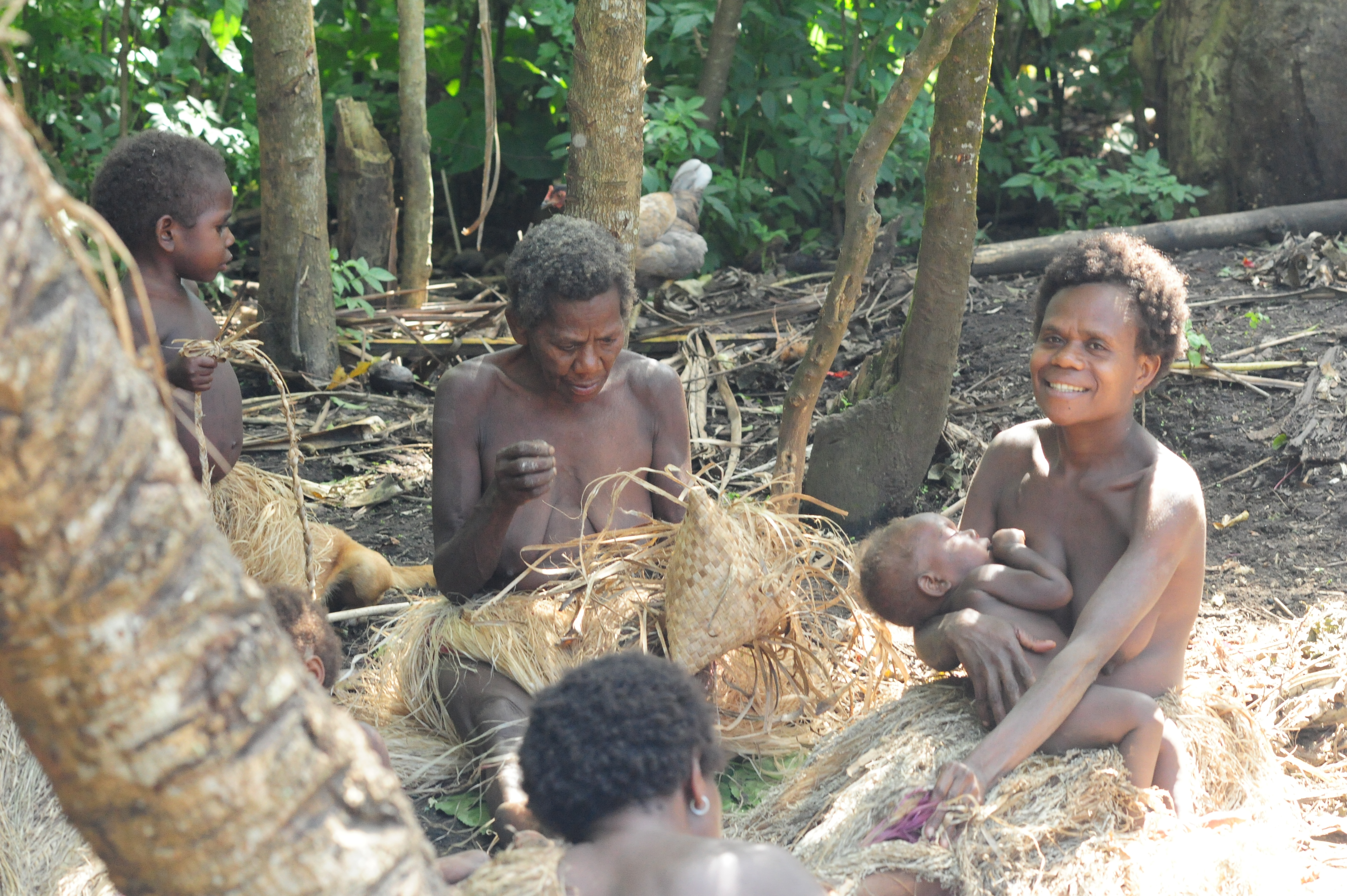
Yaohnanen women nursing their children and weaving.

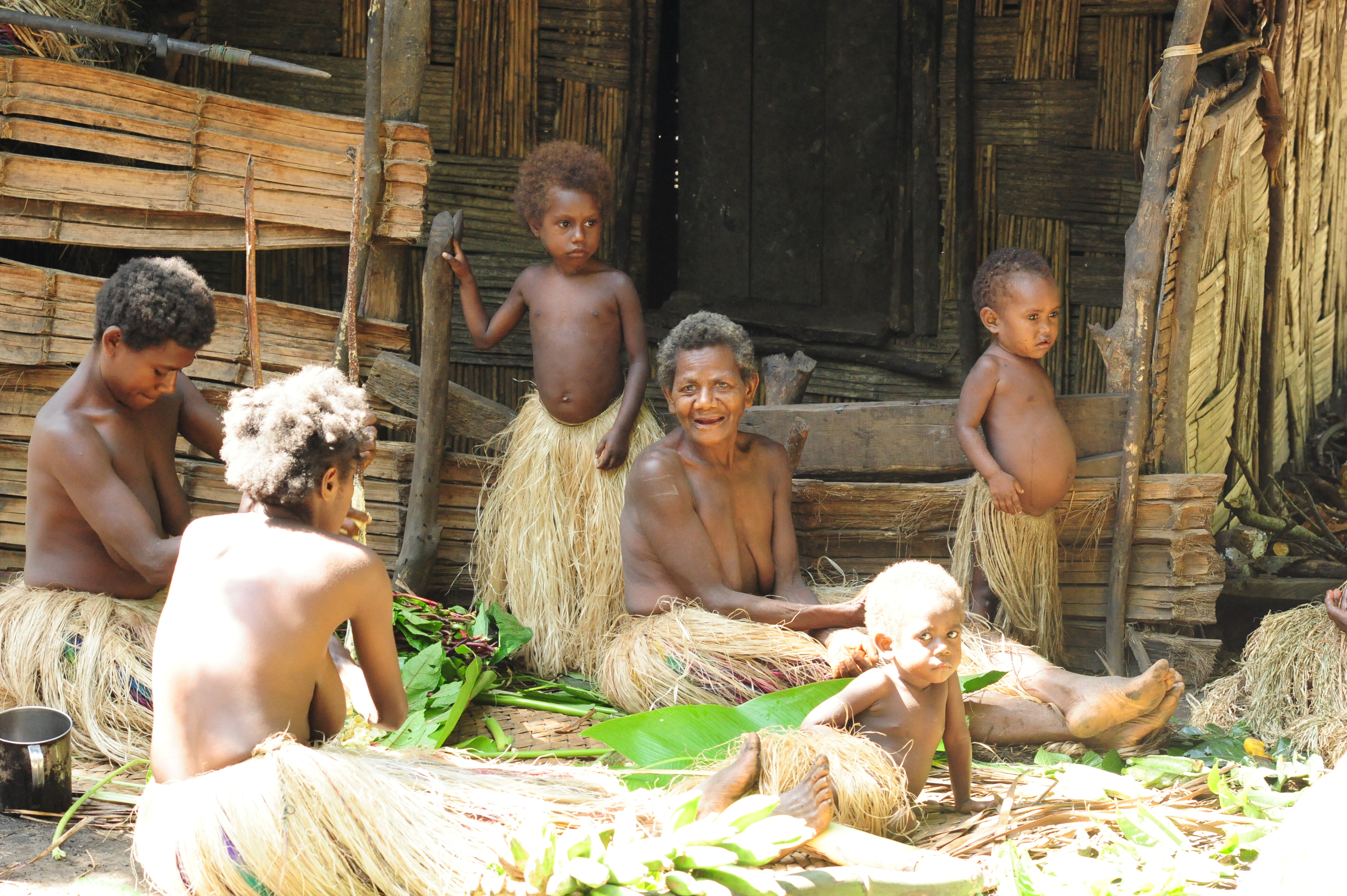
Yaohnanen women supervising their children and cooking.

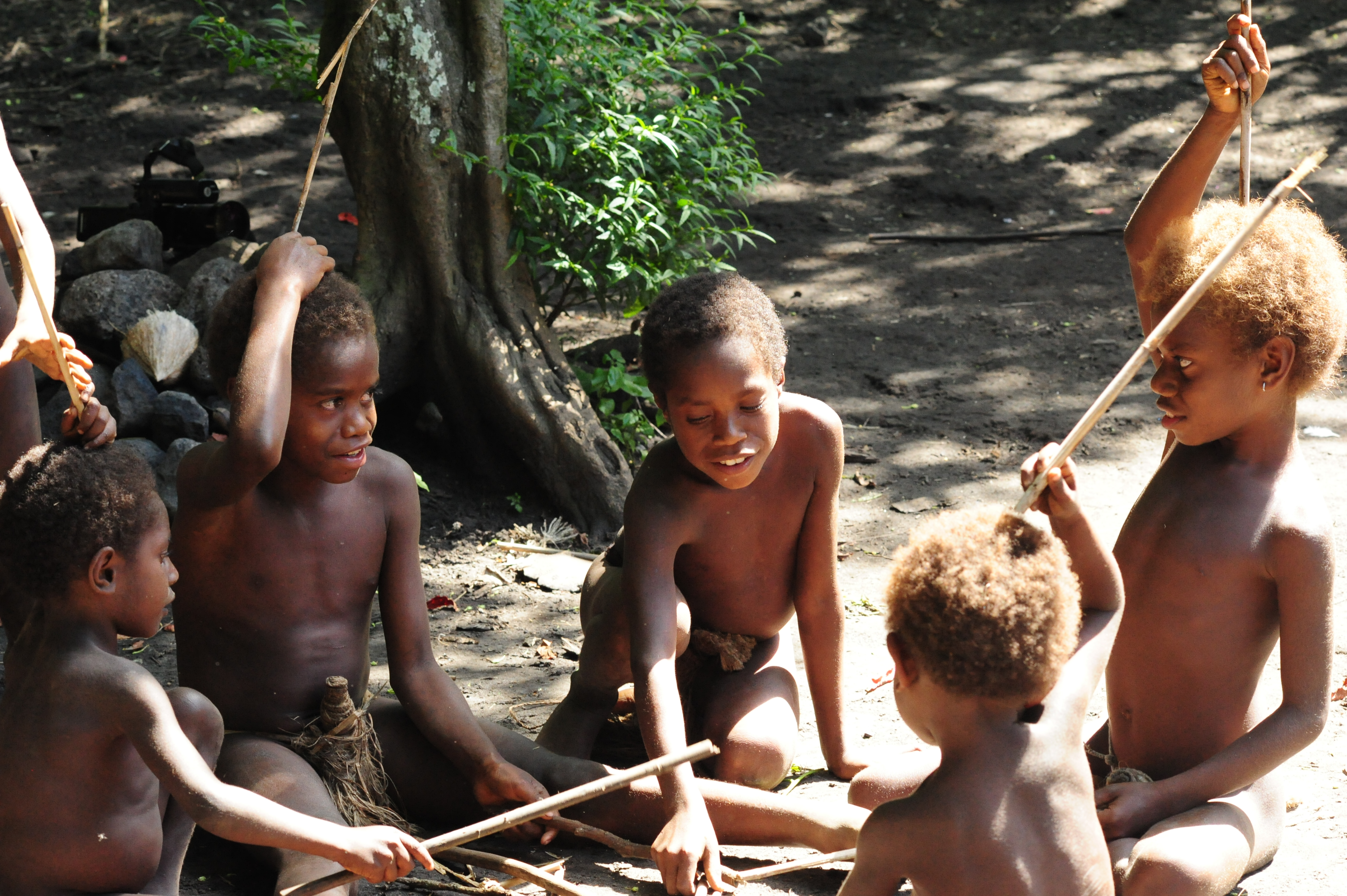
Yaohnanen children playing a traditional game.
