= Kastom =

Traditional culture, including religion, economics, art and magic in Melanesia

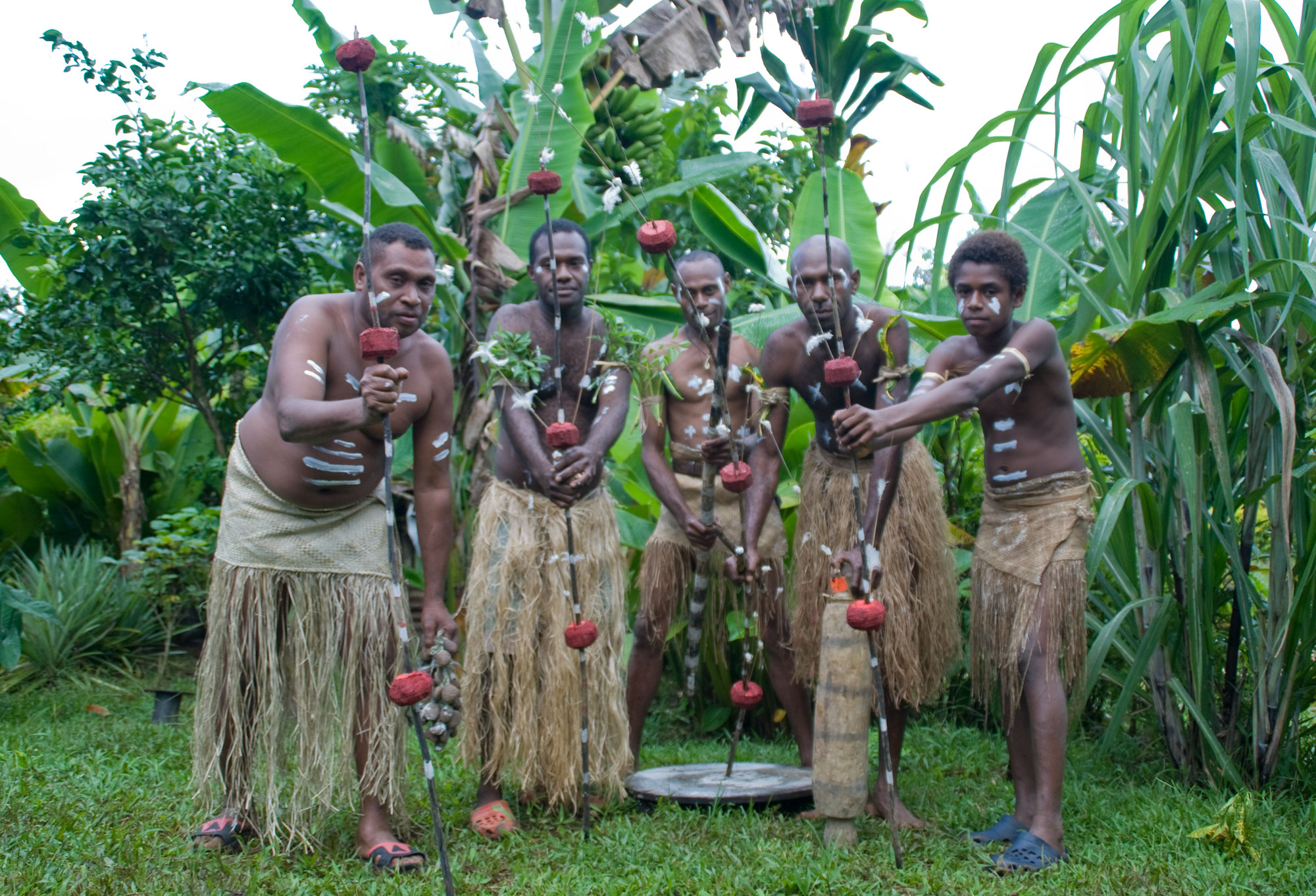
Kastom dancers in Vanuatu

Kastom is a pidgin word (Bislama/Tok Pisin) used to refer to traditional culture, including religion, economics, art and magic in Melanesia.

The term is the generally accepted term in anthropology to describe such phenomena as well as the common and lay term used in everyday language.

The word derives from the Australian English pronunciation of 'custom' but crosses meanings that incorporate:

- Convention (norm)
- Custom (law) or customary law
- Norm (sociology) and
- Tradition

It is consistent in spelling across most of the many variations in pidgin and pisin across the region.

Kastom is mostly not written, only passed down through teachings and stories. It is concentrated through:

- Kastom House - sites where objects and rituals are stored.
- Kastom stories - myths, legends and communal histories.
- ritual objects - objects of special power, significance and symbolism.

The use of the word is slightly different in the different countries and cultures of Melanesia.

There are designated Kastom villages in Vanuatu which are open to tourists, dedicated to preserving Kastom.

== See also ==
- Culture of Vanuatu
- Customary land
- Tanna (2015)
