= Natmasses =

Natmasses (singular natmas) were spirits worshipped in the ancient culture of the island of Aneityum, Vanuatu.

"Natmas, the name given to every deity, signifies literally a dead man, and they all dwelt in Uma-atmas, the Land of the Dead. Theirs was the Worship of their Ancestors."

Natmasses were represented mainly in the form of stones:

"Stones were the chief fetishes, or representatives of the natmasses, these were all sizes from that of a pebble to blocks of some tons weight. About a mile inland from our station are two blocks, each as large as the roof of a small cottage; both of them were recognized as natmasses. The one, the large one, was called the sun, and the other the moon. The sides of the larger rock are marked with some rude, sculptured figures of fishes and birds, and as one of the best fishing grounds could be seen from these rocks, certain incantations performed on these were believed to affect the success or non-success of the fishing. Every family had a basket containing a collection of natmasses of their own, a sort of penates or household gods, which they worshipped as a family." "On Aneityum the idols were all . . . of uncarved, unhewn stones. The only exception to this which we ever found was in the case of Tuatau, a natmas which I found at Anauunse and took home with me. Tuatau was of wood, a piece of a breadfruit tree."

"I may here give a brief account of one of our natmasses, which may be accepted as a typical case. His name was Rangitafu; he belonged to Nohmunjap, a district to the west of our Mission station. Rangitafu was a block of whinstone, about five feet long, a foot and a half broad, and a foot thick. He was a sea-god, and presided over shipwrecks."

The word was therefore used to refer to gods, spirits of their forebears, or their forefathers themselves:

"On Aneityum, there is a large system of irrigation, but of ancient date; . . . If you ask the natives who made these old canals for irrigation, they tell you they do not know; they suppose that they were made by the natmasses, that is, the gods, or, in other words, the spirits of their forebears, which, of course, means their forefathers themselves."
