= Neil Thomas Ministries =

Non-profit Christian organisation based on Methodism

Neil Thomas Ministries (NTM) was a non-profit, Christian organization whose doctrine is heavily based on Methodism, a branch of Protestant Christianity. In 1971, Neil Thomas and Tom Griffiths founded the organization's college in Canberra, Australia 1976. As of 2011, NTM operated missions in Vanuatu, Solomon Islands, together with other nations in Africa and Oceania including New Caledonia, the Solomon Islands, where the ministry has been highly influential. In Vanuatu the ministry serves its community through three Bible Colleges in English and Bislama, 130 churches, two junior secondary schools and several medical clinics.

The founder of the denomination, Pastor Neil Thomas, died on 11 December 2014 in Melbourne, Australia, ending 43 years of 'Neil Thomas Ministries'.

== See also ==
- Culture of Vanuatu
- Mission (Christianity)
