= Qasavara =

Qasavara is a spirit from Melanesian mythology, more precisely from the Banks Islands in the northern part of Vanuatu.

== Name ==
The name Qasavara [k͡pʷasaβara] is itself from the language of Mota, but the same deity is known under other names in neighboring islands: Mwotlap Qasvay [k͡pʷasˈβaj], Vurës Qasvar [k͡pʷasˈβar], Mwesen Woqastavav [wɔk͡pʷastaˈβaɸ], and Lakon Qasval [k͡pʷasˈβal]. All of these forms descend from a common Proto-Torres-Banks form *ᵐbʷasaβara, composed of *ᵐbʷasa "bald head" and an element *βara of unknown meaning, though the Mwesen and Lakon forms may contain a different second element.

== Mythology ==
In the Mota version of the myth, Qat, the Great Spirit who made everything, and his twelve brothers were invited to spend the night in the house of a giant named Qasavara. The giant intended to kill them while they slept and eat them, but Qat opened a crack in one of the beams of the house and the brothers hid inside the beam. In the end, Qasavara became so frustrated that one morning he chased Qat and his brothers up a casuarina tree. Qat caused the tree to grow so long that when it bent over, the tip touched a neighboring island. The brothers jumped off and the tree, released from the extra weight, sprang back, throwing Qasavara high into the sky. When Qasavara struck the ground, he died and was transformed into a stone. This stone still existed in recent times: those who desired success and strength in battle would make sacrifices upon it.

Another lesser-known version portrays Qasavara as the gatherer of the spirits of the damned, who he then feeds to mythical monsters.
