= Vanuatu Cultural Centre =

National cultural institution of Vanuatu

Coordinates: 17.7452°S 168.3175°E

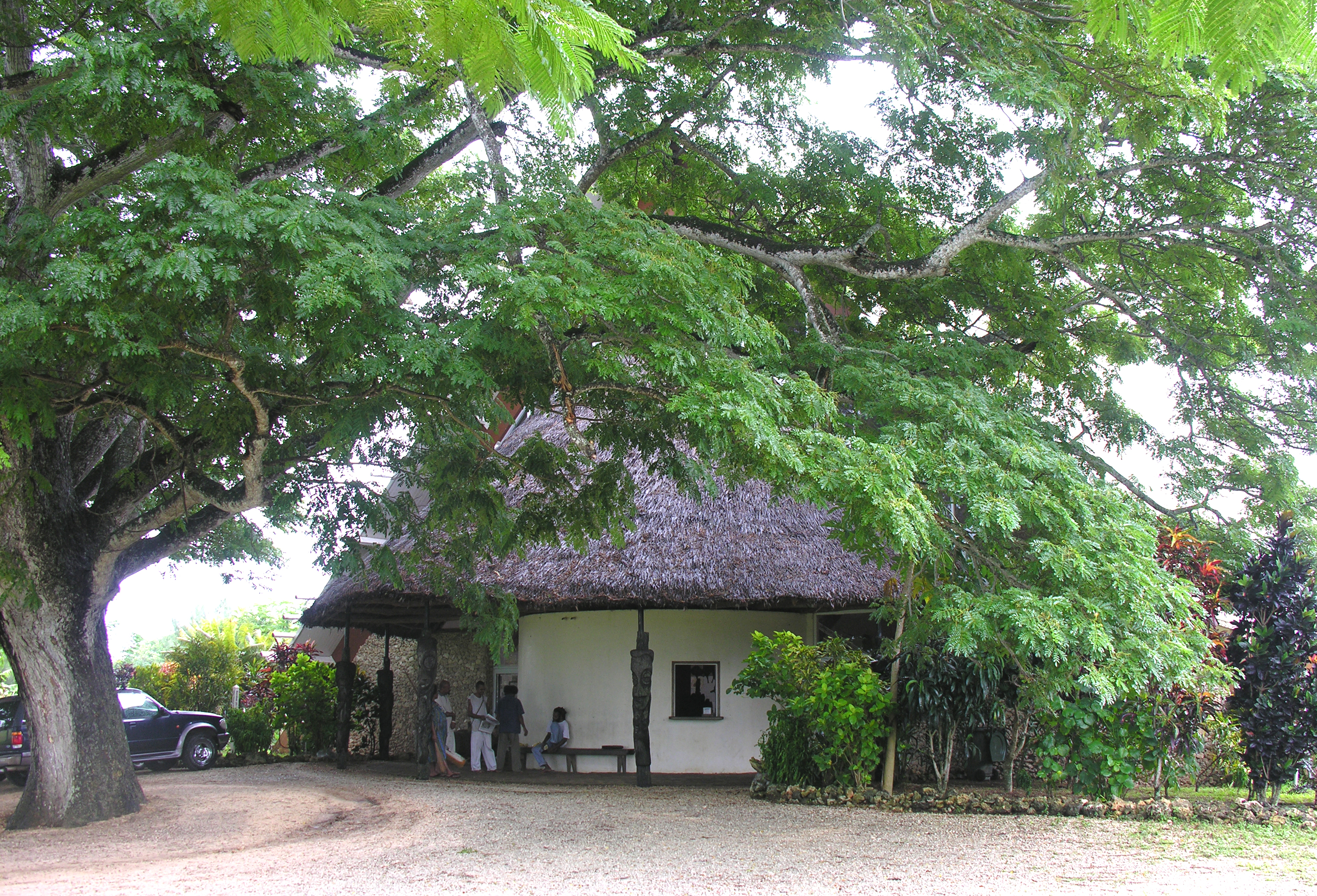
The Vanuatu Cultural Centre

The Vanuatu Cultural Centre (in Bislama Vanuatu Kaljoral Senta or "VKS"; in French Centre Culturel du Vanuatu), founded in 1955, is the national cultural institution of Vanuatu. It is located in the capital Port Vila.

From 1995 to 2006, the VKS was run by Ralph Regenvanu. From 2007 until his termination in November 2014, Abong Marcelin was director. Ambong Thompson is currently the acting Director.

== The institution ==
Describing itself as "an organisation that works to record and promote the diverse cultures" of Vanuatu, the Vanuatu Cultural Centre fulfills the role of a national body for the preservation, protection and promotion of the different aspects of the culture of the archipelago. The Vanuatu Cultural Centre is an umbrella organization which includes :

- The National Museum of Vanuatu
- The National Film and Sound Unit
- The Vanuatu Cultural and Historical Site Survey
- The National Archives
- The National Library
- The Public Library
- The Fieldworkers's Unit
- The Tafea Cultural Centre (Lenakel, Tanna)
- The Malekula Cultural Centre
- VKS E-Press

Its aim is to record and promote the traditional indigenous cultures of Vanuatu in their various aspects - from sand drawing to music, land diving, other "customary practices" and "indigenous knowledge"-, but also the country's "contemporary arts and music".

Among its projects is the Oral Traditions Collection Project, started in 1976, which has been described as "without doubt, the Pacific's most successful grassroots cultural documentation program".

The Centre produces radio programmes and videos aimed at cultural promotion, preservation or revival. As of 1996, the centre's collection contained "approximately 2500 hours of audio tape, 2300 hours of video tape, twenty-three hours of 16-millimetre film footage, thirty hours of 8-millimetre film footage, 3000 early (up to 1950s) black-and-white photographs, and around 4000 colour slides, colour negatives and black-and-white negatives". Access to some of this material is restricted, being tabu. Some material may be accessed only by men, some only by women, and some only by members of particular indigenous cultural groups.

In 2002 the German painter Ingo Kühl, after participating in an expedition of the Vanuatu Cultural Center to ceremonies of the indigenous people on Malakula, his works that were created there were shown in an exhibition at the National Museum of Vanuatu and in 2004–2005 at the Ethnological Museum of Berlin.

== See also ==
- Culture of Vanuatu
- Roy Mata Domain
- Sand drawing
- Pacific Islands Museums Association
