= Ni-Vanuatu =

Indigenous Melanesian people of Vanuatu

Ni-Vanuatu Ni-Van
- A ni-Vanuatu girl.

Total population
- c. 300,000

Regions with significant populations
- Vanuatu c. 270,000
- Australia: 2,969 (2021) (Note: In the 2021 Australian census, 2,969 people reported being born in Vanuatu. It is certain that the number of people with Ni-Vanuatu ancestry is much higher as South Sea Islanders were counted separately. In the same census, 7,227 people reported South Sea Islander ancestry, the majority of them being Queenslanders descended from Vanuatu.)
- New Zealand: 1,161 (2023)

Languages
- Bislama, English, French, over 100 Oceanic languages

Religion
- Christian (Presbyterian, Anglican, Roman Catholic), Animism

Related ethnic groups
- other Melanesian peoples

The Ni-Vanuatu, also abbreviated as Ni-Van, are a large group of closely related Melanesian ethnic groups native to the island country of Vanuatu. As such, ni-Vanuatu are a mixed ethnolinguistic group with a shared ethnogenesis that speak a multitude of languages.

The denomination of ni-Vanuatu or ni-Van is usually restricted to the indigenous population of Vanuatu; in order to refer neutrally to any citizen of Vanuatu, regardless of their origin or ethnicity, the word Vanuatuan is used. However, using Vanuatuan to refer to ni-Vanuatu people specifically is viewed as incorrect by some authors and style guides.

Due to the history of British and French colonialism, indigenous people of Vanuatu generally speak Bislama, the country's lingua franca, in addition to their own island's or group's local language, and also learn English and French at school.

The cultural aspects of ni-Vanuatu society have been instilled on the indigenous community and are expressed through clothing, rituals, ceremonies, music, performing and fine arts, and cuisine. The spiritual ties ni-Vanuatu have with their land and ancestors are conveyed through these traditions and some of these remaining artefacts have been preserved and displayed in the galleries of Vanuatu.

== Etymology ==
Ni-Vanuatu is a recent coinage. It combines the name of the country (Vanuatu, etymologically "land that stands [by itself]", i.e. ‘independent country’) with a particle ni, which encodes the genitive in indigenous languages such as North Efate, similarly to "of" in English. Etymologically, the particle descends from Proto-Oceanic, Proto-Malayo-Polynesian and Proto-Austronesian *ni. The word ni-Vanuatu thus simply means "of Vanuatu".

The Bislama dictionary defines ni-Vanuatu as a "Vanuatu citizen (especially someone of Melanesian descent rather than a naturalised expatriate)".

The term is mostly used in English and French, and is rarely used in Bislama, the country's lingua franca. The term is not used in the indigenous languages of the archipelago.

The form ni-Van is a colloquial abbreviation of ni-Vanuatu. This form was pejorative in its original usage in the 1980s by Anglophone European expatriates, similar to its French equivalent les nis, but according to New Zealand linguist Terry Crowley, by the 2000s the term ni-Van saw increasing usage among ni-Vanuatu.

== History ==
=== The indigenous population of Vanuatu ===
The first inhabitants of Vanuatu were Austronesian people, carriers of the Lapita culture, who settled the archipelago about 1200-1300BC. They were later followed by Melanesians around 500BC.

=== European settlement ===
Portuguese navigator Pedro Fernandes de Queirós visited Vanuatu in 1606. However, settlement did not occur until Captain James Cook charted the islands, naming it the New Hebrides. At the end of the 19th century, ni-Vanuatu were regularly kidnapped and forced to work in plantations in Fiji and Australia, a practice now known as "blackbirding".

In 1906, France and Britain established the New Hebrides Condominium. During the joint rule of the two countries, the ni-Vanuatu lived under both French and British authority. On 30 July 1980, the New Hebrides gained independence as the Republic of Vanuatu.

=== Land and nationalism ===
During the Condominium period, European regulations sometimes resulted in land disputes, particularly around plantations.

Upon independence, the new constitution determined that land ownership would belong to native ni-Vanuatus: the land rights were given to the traditional owners and community to make decisions.

== Society ==
=== Economic impact of economy on the people ===
Workers on the copra plantations were generally Melanesian. Melanesian workers were occupied with their own plantations leading to European owners sourcing labour from foreign countries such as French Indochina for general agricultural labour and construction. After World War II, American soldiers introduced Western items such as camp supplies, construction aviation, electricity, and running water. Introducing overseas workers combined with the introduction of modern facilities led to Vanuatu's economic momentum, which helped form the backbone of the island's copra production. Copra production was the main economic focus as other areas such as forestry, fishing, and native crafts were underdeveloped at the time. Food crops, including yams, taro, and cassava, are used for local consumption; copra production such as coconuts and cocoa make up the majority of Vanuatu's exports.

Profiles of labour workers, miners, and construction workers were mainly of Melanesian descent as labour demands rose with the economic boom. In 1953, Vietnamese workers started returning to their home country, most of them having done so by 1963. This caused a shortage in plantation workers which in turn led to recruitment from other islands such as Tahiti.

Temperamental weather strongly impacted plantations, as hurricanes destroyed the main copra of coconut plantations. Competition from overseas in combination with natural disasters led to a solution of sourcing different agricultural mediums such as cattle. Local demands for meat as well as exports welcomed another economic boom in Vanuatu.

=== Education ===
Prior to Vanuatu's independence in 1980, the French government offered additional support to the French population. Free education and buildings were developed whilst the British government required education fees from parents. The competition between the two ruling governments caused a division in the education system, as ni-Vanuatu based their decisions on financial and political reasons. The French system was popular to Melanesians, but the British system was still an option to many. Ni-Vanuatu parents would say "Yumi no save yet se wanem saed bae i win", translating to "We don't know yet which side is going to win out". The rational of many feared the unknown of which ruling government would take over the nation. Tertiary education was often presented with a bias from the French government, based on the fears of higher education presenting ideas of anti-colonialism to the general population. English-medium to French-medium university scholars reflected this concept with a ratio of 120:1 in 1983, three years after the independence of Vanuatu.

The Vanuatu Cultural Centre established a scheme whereby some of its researchers were indigenous; they were called "filwoka" (from Eng. fieldworker).

=== Ni-Vanuatu women ===
Recognition of ni-Vanuatu women in the political, business and social bubble has been growing recently; however, there are barriers that impede this growth. Social standards of Pacific women heavily emphasize the women's role as nurturers, which consists of domestic tasks such as washing clothes, cooking, gardening, and cleaning the house. Women who went overseas for their tertiary studies and returned have expressed the contrasting differences of Western and Vanuatu lifestyles. Independence was viewed differently in particular, as privacy in Western cultures was looser.

Although there are no laws against women participating in politics, there were no women serving in parliament during the 2016 election. Hilda Lini of the Vanuatu's parliament promoted women participating in politics; however, she predicted that it would take time to convince to public to do so. In October 2020, a "Vote for Women" campaign was coordinated to encourage and support women in the political scene. The municipal council reserves seats for women to represent the community and are encouraged to participate with government training programs readily available.

== Population ==
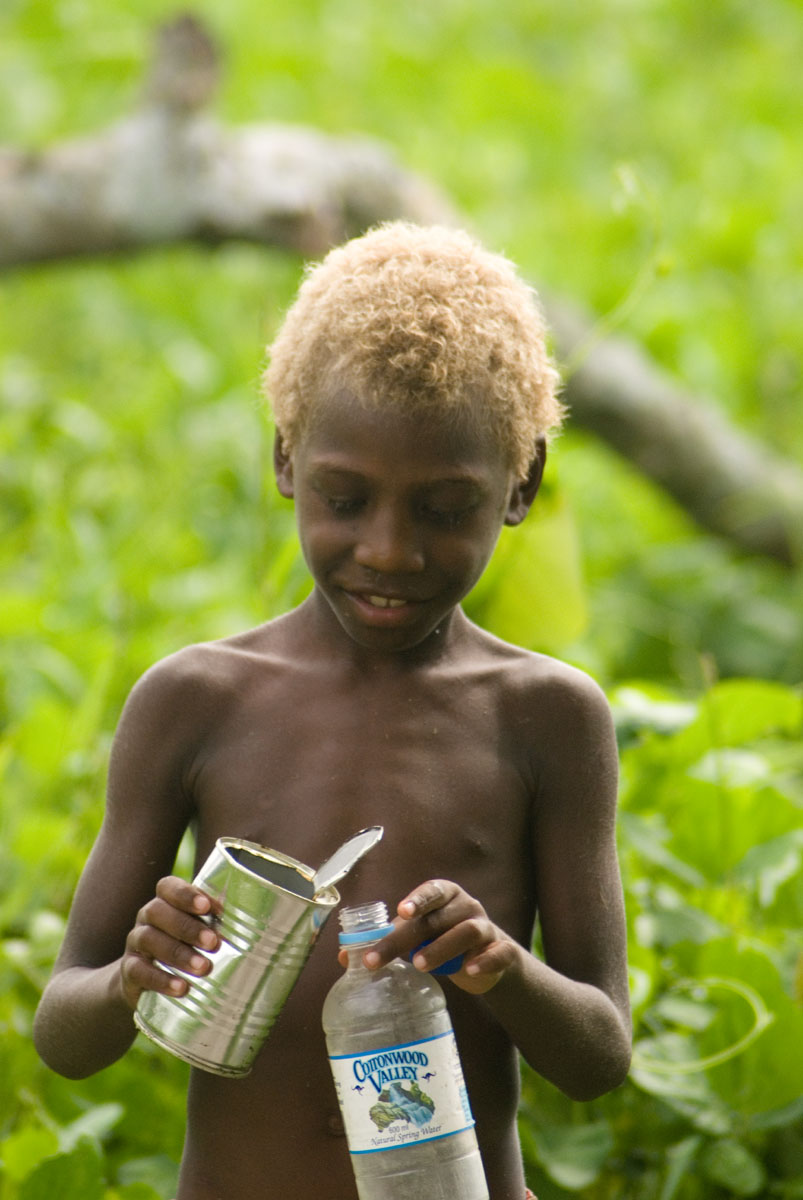
A ni-Van boy.

=== Demographics ===
75% of the ni-Vanuatu population live in rural areas, whereas the remaining 25% population live in urban areas. Port Vila and Luganville are the primary urban cities with Port Villa having a population of 35,901. The total land area is 12,189 km^{2} with a population growth rate of 1.67%. Christianity makes up the majority of the religious community as 93.5% of the population identify as Christian as of 2020.

=== Languages ===
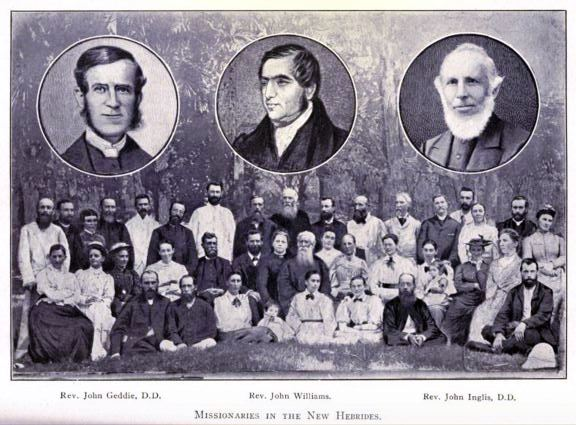
One of the first missionaries that arrived in New Hebrides – John Geddies

Vanuatu is the country with the world's highest language density per capita, with 138 languages for a population of 0.3 million. These 138 indigenous languages are still used today by two-thirds of the country's population, mainly in rural areas. These are Oceanic languages, descended historically from the country's first Austronesian settlers.

Despite the first European contact in Vanuatu in 1606, English was not introduced to ni-Vanuatu until the 1840s when English-speaking missionaries arrived. This was around the same time when European sourcing of sandalwood in the Pacific turned to Vanuatu. During the period of the New Hebrides, French and English competed for the status of main language; the population instead turned to Bislama as used as a tool of unity. Bislama was often essential as the privileged population were educated in English and middle to lower class population were often educated in French. Few people mastered both French and English, hence the use of Bislama as a lingua franca.

Upon the nation's independence in 1980, three languages have become official in Vanuatu: English, French and Bislama. French and English are used mainly for written communication whereas Bislama is widely used for verbal communication.

Bislama serves as the country's lingua franca: it serves as a bridge between citizens educated in French vs. English; and it also allows speakers of different indigenous languages to communicate among themselves.

Official welcoming speeches, opening of parliament, and most official events use Bislama. Ni-Vanuatu of different ethnic backgrounds, such as Chinese and Vietnamese, often use Bislama as greetings and opening introductions as a form of communication.

== Culture ==
=== Kastom ===
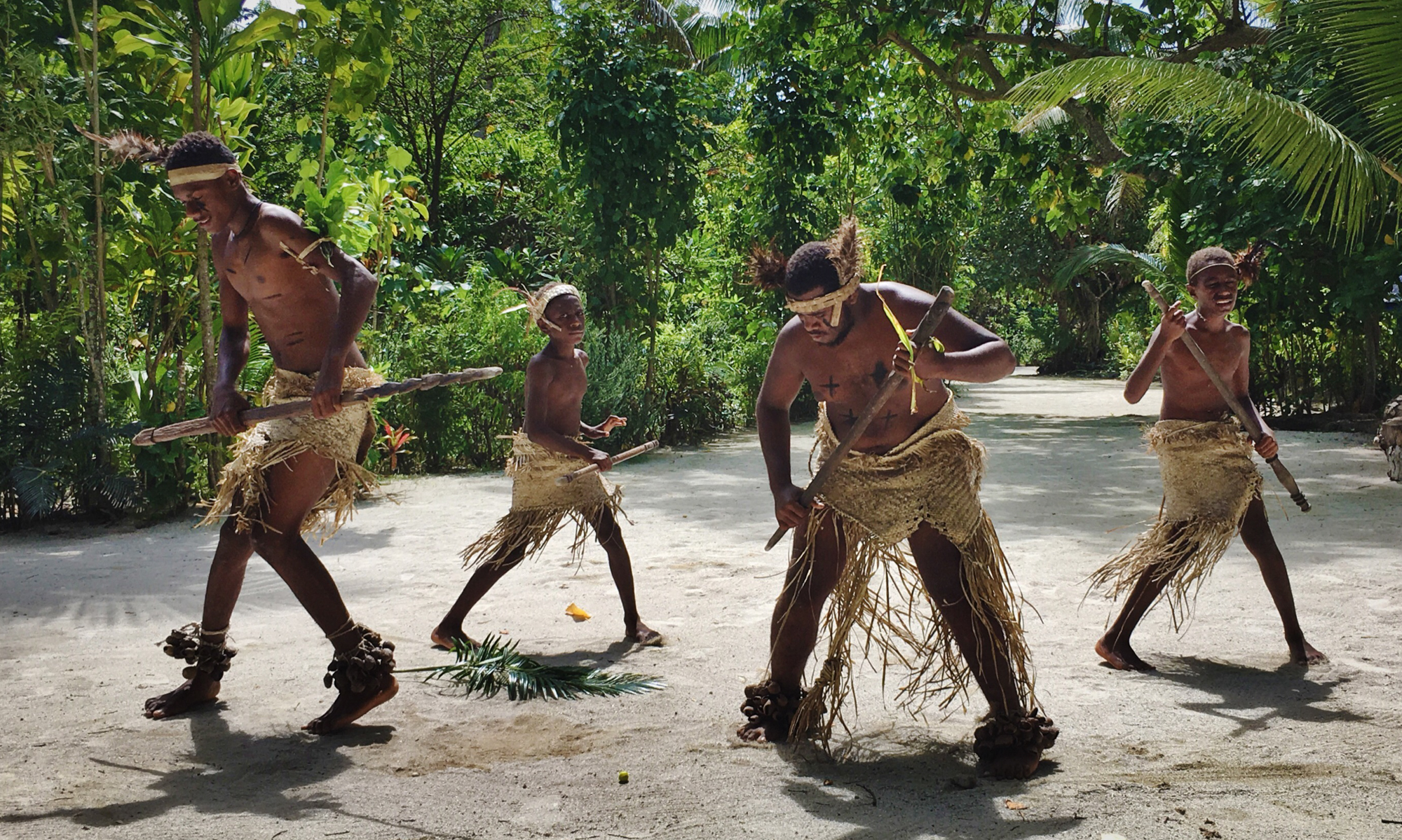
Traditional dance performed by ni-Vanuatu men

Indigenous ni-Vanuatu communities describe their traditional values and beliefs using the modern (Bislama) term kastom.

Kastom was expressed through religion, clothing, native arts, indigenous culture and languages. The development of kastom was a symbol of traditional native values compared to foreign Eurocentric concepts and ideals. It represents the unity and national identity of the ni-Vanuatu. In 1979, a year before independence, the Vanua'aku Pati of Parliament vowed to promote the "preservation and promotion of New Hebrides culture and languages", thereby sponsoring a first National Arts Festival in Port Villa to express support of kastom in the community. Parliament faced ongoing pressure from the community to preserve the traditions of ni-Vanuatu, particularly in the post-colonial era, leading to the teaching of indigenous culture being implemented in schools as well as the development of art centres.

Masks called tamate are worn by men during ceremonies and rituals. These masks are used to hide the faces of dancers as ancestral spirits enter the dancer. After the ritual is complete, it is thought that the ancestor's spirit is rebirthed as a tamate spirit. Although the masks are no longer used, the aesthetics and representations of the ancestral world continue to embody the kastoms of ni-vanuatus.

=== Clothing ===
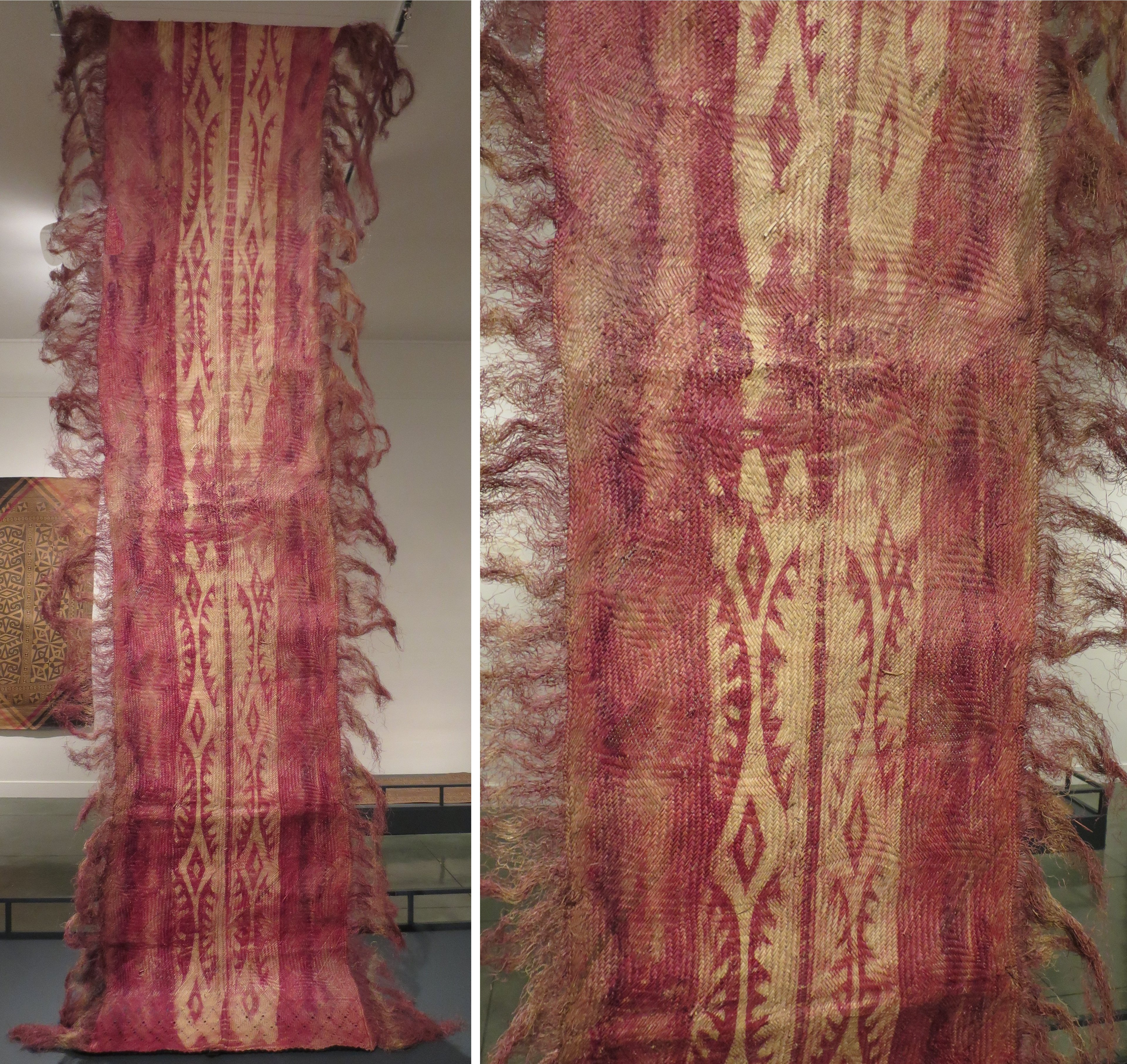
Intricate designs of a mat from Vanuatu.

Women in particular have a unique perspective in their relationship to traditional customs and colonial ideas. Island dresses represent a national connection to Vanuatu; however, many ni-Vanuatu women consciously choose to adopt modern clothing as attitudes towards convenience, aesthetics, and gender equality are considered. Although modern clothing is preferred on most occasions, the respect for kastom in island dresses are incorporated into special events such as festivals, ceremonies, and church gatherings.

Pandanus grass skirts are worn by women while penis wrappers and bark belts are worn by men. Barkcloths are also a staple of ni-Vanuatu clothing and sleeping mats. Different styles and variations of draping the barkcloths indicated the different status of the individual. Men would wear the barkcloth around their waist or drape it between their thighs and women would wear it around their waist and drape it behind their back—leading to European stories of "tailed women". These barkcloths were made from young tree bark, as it didn't break so easily, and would generally take three to four days to make. The sheets of bark would be soaked with water and women would beat layers of barks together whilst singing a special song. The layers of bark would alternately be soaked, beaten, and dried until it was deemed ready. Generally ni-Vanuatu women would create barkcloth for the community.

Penis sleeves worn by men are called yelau and they would hang down at various lengths depending on the man's status. In certain cases, some chiefs would have penis sleeves that hung down to their ankles.

=== Music and dance ===
Musical instruments and traditional dances play a large role in the rituals of indigenous ni-Vanuatu. Dances coordinated with counter-clockwise directions of circling dances represent the notions of male "hardness" during ceremonies, and clockwise directions were only accepted at a certain age for males. Musical instruments were created with organic materials such as wood, bones, leafs, rocks, vegetables, and fruits. Bamboo flutes were carved with a V-shaped notch on one end and one to three holes on the other. These instruments would be blown on one end and played with their arms extended to their waist. Hollowed cylinders were also hung from tree branches and the audible sounds created by the wind would be interpreted as ancestral voices. Dried seeds were tied to wrists and ankles by dried coconut fibres to act as rattles and coconut shells would be banged against the ground for certain games.

=== Literature ===
Oral literature was common amongst ni-Vanuatu as written literature wasn't introduced until European missionaries created formal schools. Folk tales, myths, legends, songs, and poetry were passed across generations by word of mouth before written literature was introduced.

=== Fine arts ===
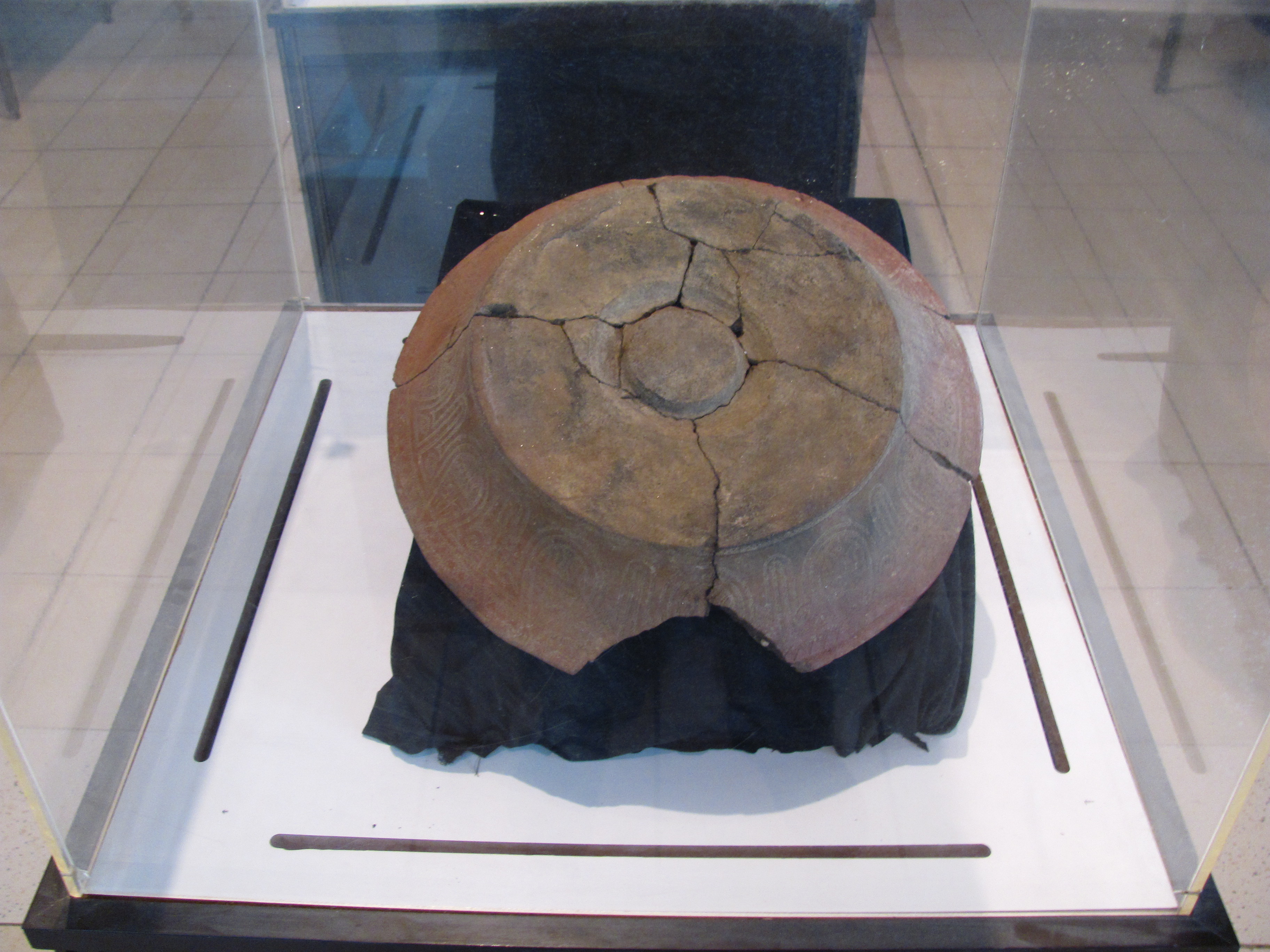
Pottery displayed in Vanuatu Cultural Centre, Port Villa

Kastom can be seen in different forms of visual and material arts by indigenous ni-Vanuatu. Material forms of art are passed down for generations as they represent customary practices such as fishing, rituals, clothing, and food preparation. The Vanuatu Cultural Centre and National Museum display artefacts collected and donated by anthropologists from 150 years ago. These artefacts are representations of cultural practices of the indigenous community of Vanuatu; however, disruption from colonialism has halted and destroyed records of these cultural and social remnants.

Pottery can be dated back as early as 1000BC on the islands of Efate with the pots found to be decorated with different styles in different regions of Vanuatu. Two main techniques were used to make these pots. The first technique involved a long coil of clay being attached to a bamboo cylinder and continuously coiled until a circular sheet of clay was added to make the base of the pot. The bamboo base was removed resulting in the conical shape of these pots. The second technique used a ball of clay that was hollowed out and molded onto the knee, which created the bowl shape. These pots were then dried out and fired. The hearth was prepared by hot stones and dried coconut fronds and bamboo were used to fuel the fire.

Contemporary arts have been criticised due to the non-indigenous forms of using western media such as watercolour and acrylic paint to portray the kastoms of the ni-Vanuatu. However, contemporary ni-Vanuatu artists have argued that representations of their cultural ties to Vanuatu are being represented in their artistic forms. Foundation Suzanne Bastien is a contemporary art gallery in Port Vila that Suzanne Bastien opened in hopes of "continued nurturing of contemporary art for future generations". The spiritual, social, and physical connection expressed by contemporary artists have indicated different communities, regions, and islands of Vanuatu with the ongoing Western influence on Melanesian culture.

=== Cuisine ===
Indigenous communities have diets that involve foraging and fishing as their main method of sustenance. It wasn't until European involvement of livestock and copra production that cattle meat and cocoa were introduced. Root vegetables such as taro and yams are a staple of traditional ni-Vanatu communities as they are considered "strong foods" that make the people strong and energetic.

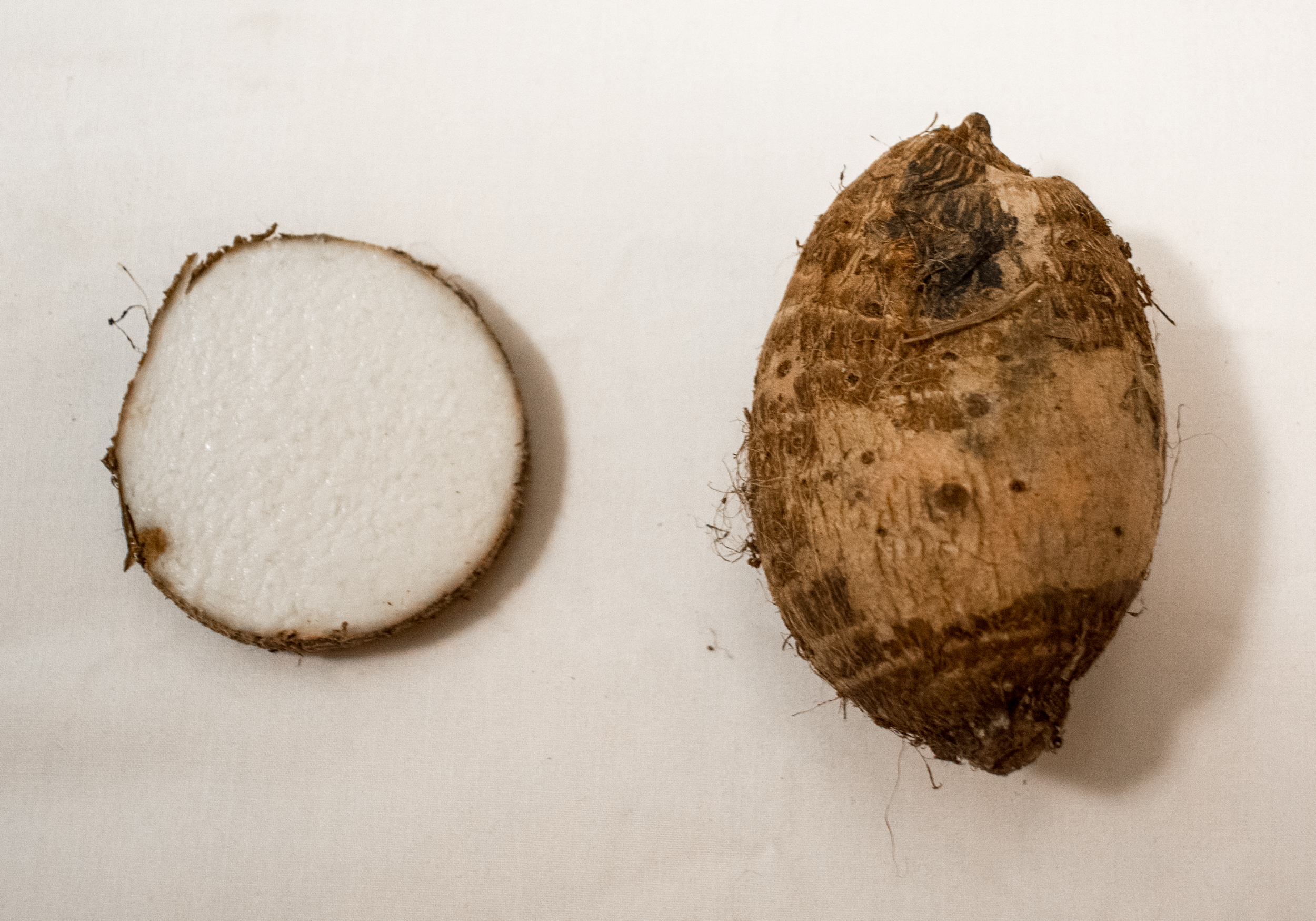
Taro was one of the main staples of the indigenous Ni-Vanuatu diet.

Hunting and fishing were designated as a role for men due to a cultural belief that a woman being on a boat would make her infertile. Thus men would hunt for fish while women would feed pigs and forage for root vegetables. Roles for men and women would be divided equally in food preparation as they have different roles in the household hut, or men's hut. However, division of the food would be dependent on the ranking of the female and males status in the community. Food prepared in the separate fire closest to the entrance of the household hut are reserved for women, children and ungraded boys while the fire closest to the back of the hut is reserved for men and graded boys. The food prepared in the men's hut would be further divided into four separate fires for the four different rankings of the men in the community.

==== Kava drinking ====
Kava is a beverage in the Oceanic regions of Polynesia, Melanesia and Micronesia. Kava plays a central role in spiritual, cultural, and social practices of indigenous ni-Vanatu. There are remedial notions of kava that it could be used for medicinal purposes.

Kava bowls are used in preparation and serving of the beverage with different types of materials being used. Kava bowls are considered sacred and have been traditionally used exclusively for kava drinking.

== See also ==
- Kanak people
- Kastom
- Vanuatu Cultural Centre
