= What Good Is A Glass Dagger? =

Fantasy novelette (published 1972)

"What Good Is A Glass Dagger?" is a fantasy novelette written by Larry Niven and published for the first time in 1972 in The Magazine of Fantasy & Science Fiction. The story occurs in the same fictional universe as the book The Magic Goes Away, by Niven, being the second story in this universe, the sequel to the short story "Not Long Before the End". Asimov comments that in this story "Niven tries to give a scientific explanation for magic." The concept of mana appears in Niven's fictional universe, and from it has spread to the RPGs. However, it is not original to the series, as Niven said he learned about it by reading Peter Worsley's book The Trumpet Shall Sound: A study of 'cargo' cults in Melanesia (1968). Niven also invokes the principle of conservation of mass at some point in the narrative.

== Plot ==
The story starts in 12000 B.C. Magical acts are sustained by an exhaustible resource called mana. Aran, who is an Atlantean werewolf, tries to steal the Warlock's Wheel, which consumes mana until its total local exhaustion, rendering magic impossible near the region where it was used. Aran believes the wheel could be used to stop wars. He fails to steal the wheel, and the Warlock inserts a glass dagger into his chest. At the end, Aran discovers he isn't a human who becomes a wolf, but rather a wolf who turns into a human.
