= Cargo cult =

New religious movement

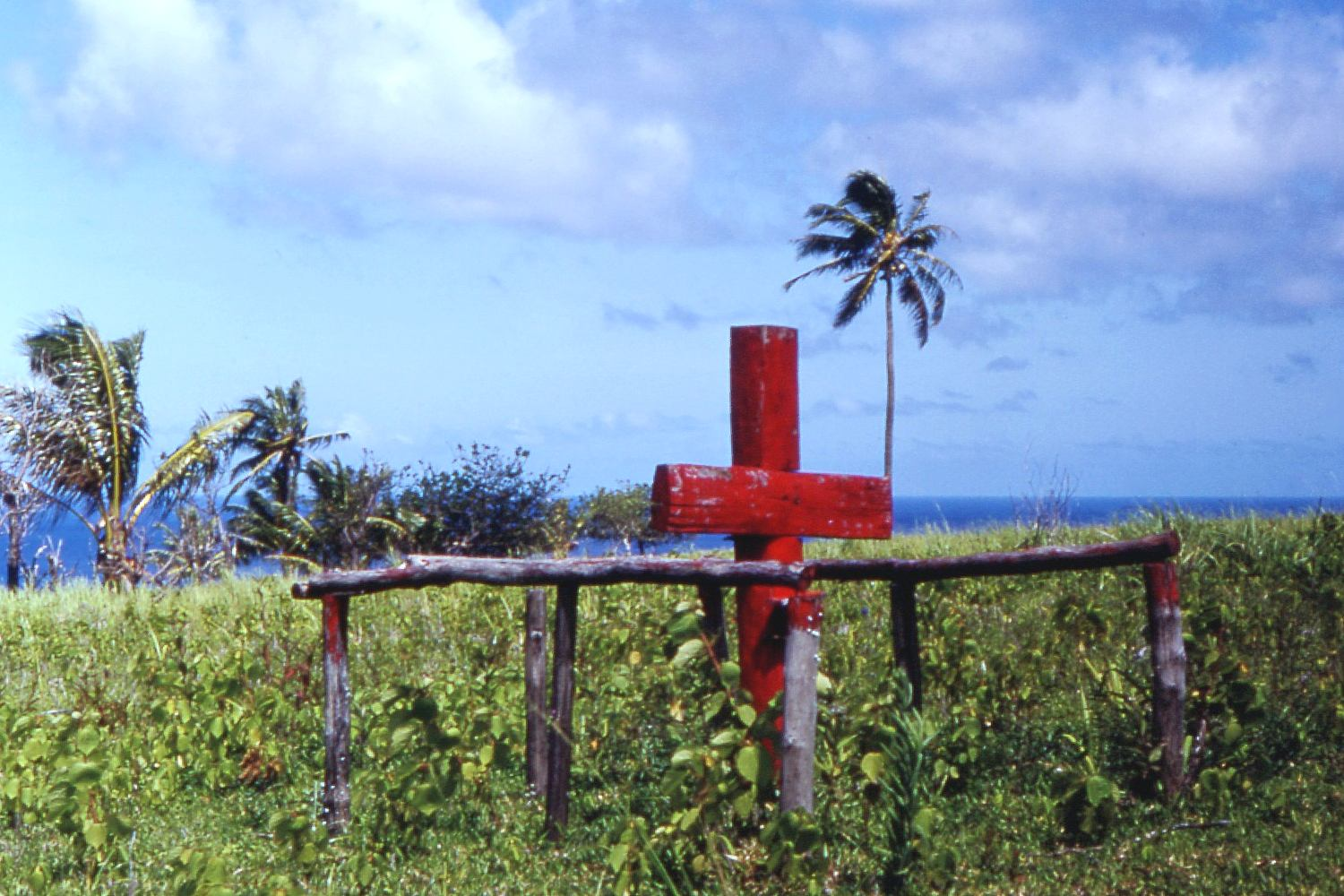
A ceremonial cross of the John Frum cargo cult, Tanna island, New Hebrides (now Vanuatu), 1967

Cargo cults are spiritual and political movements that arose among indigenous Melanesians following Western colonisation of the region in the early 20th century. The first documented cargo cults were religious movements that foretold followers would imminently receive an abundance of (often Western) food and goods (the "cargo") brought by their ancestors. Cargo cults have a wide diversity of beliefs and practices, but typically (though not universally) include: charismatic prophet figures foretelling a coming cataclysm or utopia for followers (a worldview known as millenarianism); predictions by these prophets of the return of dead ancestors or other powerful beings bringing the cargo; the belief that ancestral spirits were responsible for the creation of the cargo; and the instruction by these prophets to followers to fulfill the prophecy by either reviving ancestral traditions or adopting new rituals, such as ecstatic dancing or imitating the actions of colonists and military personnel, like flag-raising, marching and drilling. Use of the term has declined in anthropological scholarship on the basis that it bundles together too wide a diversity of movements and is too pejorative.

Anthropologists have described cargo cults as rooted in pre-existing aspects of Melanesian society, as a reaction to colonial oppression and inequality disrupting traditional village life, or both. Groups labeled as cargo cults were subject to a considerable number of anthropological publications from the late 1940s to the 1960s. After Melanesian countries gained political independence, few new groups matching the term have emerged since the 1970s, with some surviving cargo cult groups transitioning into indigenous churches and political movements. The term has largely fallen out of favour and is now seldom used among anthropologists, though its use as a metaphor (in the sense of engaging in ritual action to obtain material goods) is widespread outside of anthropology in popular commentary and critique, based on stereotypes of cargo cultists as "primitive and confused people who use irrational means to pursue rational ends".

== Origin of the term and definitions ==
The term "cargo cult" first appeared in print in the November 1945 issue of Pacific Islands Monthly, in an entry written by Norris Mervyn Bird, an 'old Territories resident', who expressed concern regarding the effects of World War II, the teachings of Christian missionaries and the increasing liberalisation of colonial authorities in Melanesia would have on local islanders.

Stemming directly from religious teaching of equality, and its resulting sense of injustice, is what is generally known as 'Vailala Madness', or 'Cargo Cult'. . . . A native, infected with the disorder, states that a great number of ships loaded with 'cargo' had been sent by the ancestor of the native for the benefit of the natives of a particular village or area. But the white man, being very cunning, knows how to intercept these ships and takes the 'cargo' for his own use ... We have seen grave harm to the native population arising from the "Vailala Madness," where livestock has been destroyed, and gardens neglected in the expectation of the magic cargo arriving. The natives infected by the "Madness" sank into indolence and apathy regarding common hygiene, with dire effect on the health of the community.

— Norris Mervyn Bird, Pacific Islands Monthly, 1945

Previous similar phenomena, first documented in the late 19th century, had been labelled with the term "Vailala Madness", to which the term "cargo cult" was then retroactively applied. Bird took the term from derogatory descriptions used by planters and businessmen in the Australian Territory of Papua. From this issue, the term became used in anthropology following the publications of Australian anthropologists Lucy Mair and H. Ian Hogbin in the late 1940s and early 1950s.

Peter Worsley defined cargo cults as follows in his 1957 book The Trumpet Shall Sound; this description became the standard definition of the term:

strange religious movements in the South Pacific [that arose] during the last few decades. In these movements, a prophet announces the imminence of the end of the world in a cataclysm which will destroy everything. Then the ancestors will return, or God, or some other liberating power, will appear, bringing all the goods the people desire, and ushering in a reign of eternal bliss. The people therefore prepare themselves for the Day by setting up cult organizations, and by building storehouses, jetties, and so on to receive the goods, known as 'cargo' in the local pidgin English. Often, also, they abandon their gardens, kill off their livestock, eat all their food, and throw away their money.

In 1964, Peter Lawrence described the term as follows: "A cargo belief (myth) described how European goods were invented by a cargo deity and indicated how men could get them from him via their ancestors by following a cargo prophet or leader. Cargo ritual was any religious activity designed to produce goods in this way and assumed to have been taught [to] the leader [of the cargo cult] by the deity. ... A cargo cult [was] a complex of ritual activity associated with a particular cargo myth".

In 2010 Australian anthropologist Martha Macintyre gave the following elements as what she considered characteristic of cargo cults:

- They involve ritual activities that in some way imitate or mimic actions associated with whites/Europeans.
- These activities are aimed at effecting transformations and/or reversals in status (often associated with skin colour), wealth and power for adherents.
- They involve stories of the 'loss' of skills, goods and knowledge to white people (often those who colonized them) through some moral failure or offence. Some of the rites or practices aim to redeem these failures in order to effect the transformation.
- They have (charismatic) local leaders.
- They have strong nativist elements – that is, they aim at advancing the political interests of local people by appealing to the reinstatement of specific 'traditional' practices and they see their movement as one that reclaims self-determination and independence from (white) foreign control.
- They entail beliefs in the return of ancestors bringing wealth in the form of money, European goods etc –'cargo'.
- They include utopian and/or millenarian ideas of a future in which people will not have to labour.
- They have continued over many decades, changing slightly, but maintaining core beliefs and practices.

Anthropologist Lamont Lindstrom has written that some anthropologists consider the term to be a "false category" because it "bundles together diverse and particular uprisings, disturbances, and movements that may have little in common". Lindstrom also writes that "anthropologists and journalists borrowed the term to label almost any sort of organised, village-based social movement with religious and political aspirations", and that their usage of the term "could encompass a variety of forms of social unrest that ethnographers elsewhere tagged millenarian, messianic, nativistic, vitalistic, revivalistic, or culture-contact or adjustment movements". Lindstrom writes that while many anthropologists suggest that "cargo" often signified literal material goods, it could also reflect desires for "moral salvation, existential respect, or proto-nationalistic, anti-colonial desire for political autonomy".

== Causes, beliefs, and practices ==
Characteristic elements of most cargo cults include the synthesis of indigenous and foreign elements in the belief system, the expectation of help from ancestors, the presence of charismatic leaders, and strong belief in the appearance of an abundance of goods.

The indigenous societies of Melanesia were typically characterized by a "big man" political system in which individuals gained prestige through gift exchanges. The more wealth a man could distribute, the more people who were in his debt, and the greater his renown. Faced, through colonialism, with foreigners with a seemingly unending supply of goods for exchange, indigenous Melanesians experienced "value dominance". That is, they were dominated by others in terms of their own (not the foreign) value system. Many Melanesians found the concept of money incomprehensible, and many cargo cult movements ordered followers to abandon colonial money by either dumping it into the sea or spending it rapidly, with the prophets promising that it would be replaced by new money and they would be freed from their debts.

Many cargo cults existed in opposition to colonial rule, often linked to burdens placed on villagers by colonial authorities, such as head taxes. Many cargo cult movements sought to revive ancestral traditions (often in the face of their suppression by missionaries or colonial authorities) such as kava drinking, or adopt new rituals such as ecstatic dancing or actions imitative of colonial practices, like flag-raising and marching. Cargo cults often served to unite previously opposing groups. In some movements, the leaders engaged in authoritarian behaviour in order to uphold the new social order, with a particular focus on the issues of sorcery and sexual activity. In some movements sexual morality was relaxed, ignoring the pre-existing customs regarding exogamy and incest, while in other movements, strict celibacy policies were implemented.

Since the modern manufacturing process was largely unknown to them, members, leaders, and prophets of the cults often maintained that the manufactured goods of the non-native culture had been created by spiritual means, such as through their deities and ancestors, or that an ancestor had learned how to manufacture the goods. These leaders claimed that the goods were intended for the local indigenous people, but the foreigners had unfairly gained control of these objects through malice or mistake. Thus, a characteristic feature of cargo cults was the belief that spiritual agents would, at some future time, give much valuable cargo and desirable manufactured products to the cult members. The goods promised by prophets and the means by which they would arrive both changed with the times, across eras of Western colonization. The earliest known cults foretold their ancestors with the goods would arrive on a canoe, then by sail, then by steamship, and the goods could be matches, steel, or calico fabric. After World War II, the goods could be shoes, canned meat, knives, rifles, or ammunition, and they would arrive by armored ship or plane.

== Examples ==
=== First occurrences ===
Discussions of cargo cults usually begin with a series of movements that occurred in the late nineteenth century and early twentieth century. The earliest recorded movement that has been described as a "cargo cult" was the Tuka Movement that began in Fiji in 1885 at the height of the colonial era's plantation-style economy. The movement began with a promised return to a golden age of ancestral potency. Minor alterations to priestly practices were undertaken to update them and attempt to recover some kind of ancestral efficacy. Colonial authorities saw the leader of the movement, Tuka, as a troublemaker, and he was exiled, although their attempts to stop him returning proved fruitless.

Cargo cults occurred periodically in many parts of the island of New Guinea, including the Taro Cult in northern Papua New Guinea and the Vailala Madness that arose from 1919 to 1922. The last was documented by Francis Edgar Williams, one of the first anthropologists to conduct fieldwork in Papua New Guinea. Less dramatic cargo cults have appeared in western New Guinea as well, including the Asmat and Dani areas.

=== Pacific cults of World War II ===
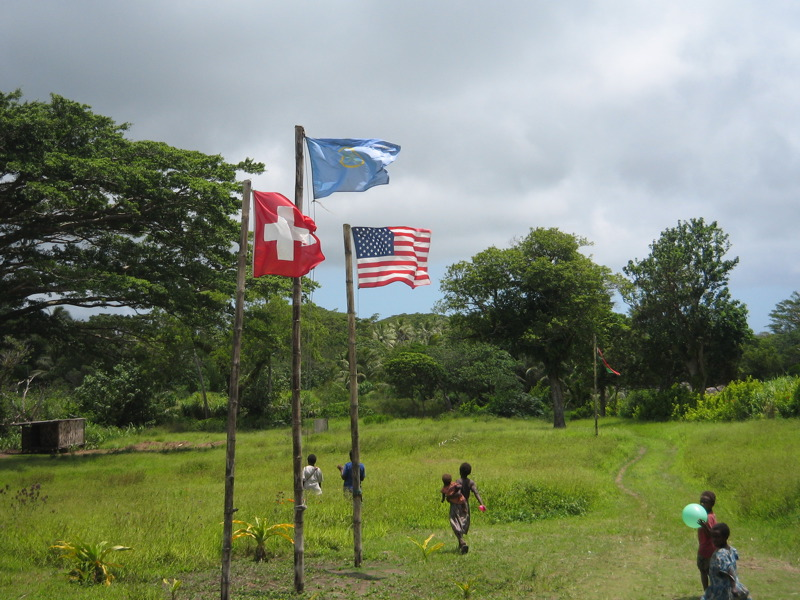
Members of the John Frum cult at a ceremonial flag-raising

The most widely known period of cargo cult activity occurred among the Melanesian islanders in the years during and after World War II. A small population of indigenous peoples observed, often directly in front of their dwellings, the largest war ever fought by technologically advanced nations. Japanese forces used their foreknowledge of local cargo cult beliefs, intentionally misrepresenting themselves as the ancestors of the Melanesians and distributing goods freely in order to acquire compliance and labor. Later the Allied forces arrived in the islands and did this as well.

The vast amounts of military equipment and supplies that both sides airdropped (or airlifted to airstrips) to troops on these islands meant drastic changes to the lifestyle of the islanders, many of whom had never seen outsiders before. Manufactured clothing, medicine, canned food, tents, weapons and other goods arrived in vast quantities for the soldiers, who often shared some of it with the islanders who were their guides and hosts. This was true of the Japanese Army as well, at least until relations deteriorated in most regions.

In the late 1930s, the John Frum movement emerged on Tanna in Vanuatu. This tradition urged islanders to resume dancing and kava drinking (which had been suppressed by missionaries) and to maintain historic traditions. The movement predicted American assistance, which as foretold arrived in 1942. The movement's rituals were influenced by Christianity, and also included similar elements to other cargo cults like "marching and drilling, flags and poles, and flowers". The John Frum movement has come to be described as the "archetypal" cargo cult.

=== Postwar developments ===
With the end of the war, the military abandoned the airbases and stopped dropping cargo. In response, charismatic individuals developed cults among remote Melanesian populations that promised to bestow on their followers deliveries of food, arms, Jeeps, etc. The cult leaders explained that the cargo would be gifts from their own ancestors, or other sources, as had occurred with the outsider armies.

In attempts to get cargo to fall by parachute or land in planes or ships again, islanders imitated the same practices they had seen the military personnel use. Cult behaviors usually involved mimicking the day-to-day activities and dress styles of US soldiers, such as performing parade ground drills with wooden or salvaged rifles. The islanders carved headphones from wood and wore them while sitting in fabricated control towers. They waved the landing signals while standing on the runways. They lit signal fires and torches to light up runways and lighthouses.

In a form of sympathetic magic, many built life-size replicas of airplanes out of straw and cut new military-style landing strips out of the jungle, hoping to attract more airplanes. The cult members thought that the foreigners had some special connection to the deities and ancestors of the natives, who were the only beings powerful enough to produce such riches.

Cargo cults were typically created by individual leaders, or big men in the Melanesian culture. The leaders typically held cult rituals well away from established towns and colonial authorities, thus making reliable information about these practices very difficult to acquire.

== Current status ==
Some cargo cults are still active. These include:

- The John Frum cult on Tanna Island (Vanuatu)
- The Tom Navy cult on Tanna Island (Vanuatu)
- The Prince Philip Movement on the island of Tanna, which worships Prince Philip, Duke of Edinburgh
- The Turaga movement based on Pentecost island (Vanuatu)
- Yali's cargo cult on Papua New Guinea (Madang region)
- The Paliau movement on Papua New Guinea (Manus Island)
- The Peli association on Papua New Guinea
- The Pomio Kivung on Papua New Guinea

Classification of groups as cargo cults was sometimes controversial. For example, in 1962 the separatist Hahalis Welfare Society on Buka Island was classed by Australian authorities as a cargo cult, but this was denied by its leaders Francis Hagai and John Teosin. As of 1993, Lamont Lindstrom reports that many Melanesian political movements "must take care to deny explicitly" any connection with cargo cults.

== Theoretical explanations ==
Anthropologist Anthony F. C. Wallace conceptualized the "Tuka movement" as a revitalization movement. Peter Worsley's analysis of cargo cults placed the emphasis on the economic and political causes of these popular movements. He viewed them as "proto-national" movements by indigenous peoples seeking to resist colonial interventions. He observed a general trend away from millenarianism towards secular political organization through political parties and cooperatives.

Theodore Schwartz was the first to emphasize that both Melanesians and Europeans place great value on the demonstration of wealth. "The two cultures, broadly speaking, met on the common ground of materialistic, competitive striving for prestige through entrepreneurial achievement of wealth." Melanesians felt "relative deprivation" in their standard of living, and thus came to focus on cargo as an essential expression of their personhood and agency.

Peter Lawrence was able to add greater historical depth to the study of cargo cults, and observed the striking continuity in the indigenous value systems from pre-cult times to the time of his study. Kenelm Burridge, in contrast, placed more emphasis on cultural change, and on the use of memories of myths to comprehend new realities, including the "secret" of European material possessions. His emphasis on cultural change follows from Worsley's argument on the effects of capitalism; Burridge points out these movements were more common in coastal areas which faced greater intrusions from European colonizers.

Cargo cults often develop during a combination of crises. Under conditions of social stress, such a movement may form under the leadership of a charismatic figure. This leader may have a "vision" (or "myth-dream") of the future, often linked to an ancestral efficacy ("mana") thought to be recoverable by a return to traditional morality. This leader may characterize the present state as a dismantling of the old social order, meaning that social hierarchy and ego boundaries have been broken down.

Contact with colonizing groups brought about a considerable transformation in the way indigenous peoples of Melanesia have thought about other societies. Early theories of cargo cults began from the assumption that practitioners simply failed to understand technology, colonization, or capitalist reform; in this model, cargo cults are a misunderstanding of the systems involved in resource distribution, and an attempt to acquire such goods in the wake of interrupted trade. However, many of these practitioners actually focus on the importance of sustaining and creating new social relationships, with material relations being secondary.

Since the late twentieth century, alternative theories have arisen. For example, some scholars, such as Kaplan and Lindstrom, focus on Europeans' characterization of these movements as a fascination with manufactured goods and what such a focus says about consumerism. Others point to the need to see each movement as reflecting a particularized historical context, even eschewing the term "cargo cult" for them unless there is an attempt to elicit an exchange relationship from Europeans.

=== Discourse on cargo cults ===
According to Ton Otto, the most forceful criticism of the term cargo cult comes from Nancy McDowell, who argues that cargo cults don't really exist as a distinct phenomenon, but rather reflect a general bias in some observers to view change as sudden and complete rather than gradual and evolutionary. Otto disagrees, arguing that McDowell overly focused on just one aspect of the term (the perception of change), and that the term remains a valuable analytical and comparative tool because it encapsulates a range of features that, when combined, allow for useful comparisons of social movements that frequently shared similar characteristics, even if not all features were present in every case.

Otto also summarizes Lamont Lindstrom's analysis and examination of "cargoism", the discourse of Western scholarship about cargo cults. Lindstrom's analysis is concerned with Western fascination with the phenomenon in both academic and popular writing. In his opinion, the term cargo cult is deeply problematic because of its pejorative connotation of backwardness, since it imputes a goal (cargo) obtained through the wrong means (cult); the actual goal is not so much obtaining material goods as creating and renewing social relationships under threat. Martha Kaplan thus argues in favor of erasing the term altogether, though Otto argues the term remains useful. The term cargo cult is increasingly avoided in the field of anthropology for failing to represent the complexity of Melanesian beliefs.

In the late 1990s, religious scholar Andreas Grünschloß applied the term "cargoism" to adherents of UFO religions regarding their millenarian beliefs about the arrival of intelligent aliens on technologically advanced spacecraft on planet Earth, in comparison to the Melanesian islanders's faith in the return of John Frum carrying the cargo with him on the islands.

== As a metaphor ==
The term "cargo cult" is widely used negatively as a metaphor outside anthropology. Usage often relates to the ideas of desire (particularly for wealth and material goods) and relatedly consumerism and capitalism, ritual action and the expectation of rational results from irrational means. Richard Feynman used the term to describe situations where people focus on superficial aspects of a process without understanding the underlying principles – he specifically cautioned against "cargo cult science", warning that adopting the appearances of scientific investigation without a self-critical attitude will fail to produce reliable results. "Cargo cult programming" was popularized as computing slang to describe the inclusion of code that serves no purpose in a program, indicating a lack of understanding of the program structure by the programmer. Lindstrom noted in 2013 that users of the term have stretched the definition to such a degree that it has become a general pejorative for "almost anything that some critic depreciates".

== Works ==
- God Is American
- The Gods Must Be Crazy – 1980 film by Jamie Uys
- Island of the Sequined Love Nun – Novel by Christopher Moore
- Meet the Natives: USA

== See also ==
- Culture shock – Experience of a person moving to a different cultural environment
- Ghost Dance – Native American religious movement
- Johnson cult – 1964 protest movement in Papua New Guinea
- Magical thinking – Belief in the connection of unrelated events
- Prosperity theology – Material wealth-based Protestant belief
- Sociological classifications of religious movements

== Filmography ==
- God is American, feature documentary (2007, 52 min), by Richard Martin-Jordan, on John Frum's cult at Tanna.
