= Robert G. Watts =

Professor of Mechanical Engineering

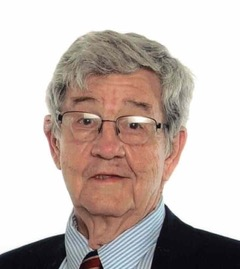
- Born: March 28, 1937 (age 89); Shreveport, Louisiana
- Education: Tulane University; Massachusetts Institute of Technology; Purdue
- Awards: ASME–Pi Tau Sigma Outstanding Teacher Award; George Hawkins Memorial Lecturer, Purdue University (2000); Dixie Lee Ray Award for environmental contributions, ASME (2009)
- Engineering career
- Institutions: Tulane University; Oak Ridge National Laboratory; International Institute for Applied Systems Analysis; Batelle Northwest Laboratories in DC

Robert Glen Watts is an American professor of mechanical engineering noted for his work in thermodynamics, fluid mechanics, energy systems, climate research and the physics of sports. He is Professor Emeritus at Tulane University, where he held the Cornelia and Arthur L. Jung Chair in Mechanical Engineering beginning in 1996.

Watts is the author of several books, including Global Warming and the Future of the Earth, Essentials of Applied Mathematics for Scientists and Engineers, and, with co-authors, Keep Your Eye on the Ball: The Science and Folklore of Baseball. His research has addressed subjects ranging from energy balance climate models and sea ice growth to the aerodynamics of baseballs and American footballs.

He is a Fellow of the American Society of Mechanical Engineers and recipient of the ASME Dixie Lee Ray Award for environmental contributions. In 2000, he delivered the George Hawkins Memorial Lecture at Purdue University.

== Early life and education ==
Watts is the son of Donald F. and Ernestine McCaleb Watts. His father was a tenor and his mother a dancer in one of the Big Bands of the 1930s. He and his older brother Donald Jr. were both born in Shreveport, Louisiana. Robert was born March 28, 1937 and Donald on November 4, 1935. Their mother divorced shortly after Robert's birth and the family moved to New Orleans. Ernestine could not care for the boys while she worked to support them, so the boys lived in several care-giver facilities such as the German-Protestant Children's Home, Sam Barth’s, and the Waldo Burton Memorial Boys Home. They visited their mother and grandmother occasionally on weekends. In 1944 Ernestine married a soldier named William Otho Kees. While William was in the Pacific Islands during World War II Ernestine bought a small farm in Bush, Louisiana. There was no electricity and the families in Bush were very poor, but people survived well from large gardens and chicken eggs. Children attended a small four-room elementary school named Oak Grove School. Though the school was very small the teachers there were excellent. The students went on to complete their education at nearby Covington High School and many went on to be college graduates.

Watts had an interest in sports from a young age. He played football and basketball and ran track in high school, and was a semi-pro baseball player which later inspired him to write a book about the fluid mechanics of the sport.

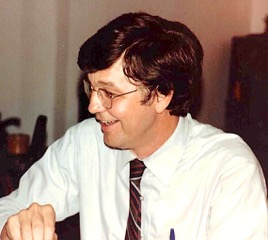
Professor of Mechanical Engineering and Climate Change Researcher

== Academic career ==
Watts received a scholarship to attend Tulane University where he had planned to study architecture but ended up studying mechanical engineering. After graduating from Tulane he received a fellowship to attend MIT in nuclear engineering where he obtained a master's degree in 1960. He then enrolled in the graduate program at Purdue from which he received a PhD in mechanical engineering.

Watts began his teaching career after completing his graduate studies in mechanical engineering, serving as a faculty member and researcher in fluid mechanics and thermodynamics.

He joined the faculty of Tulane University in the Department of Mechanical Engineering, where he taught and conducted research for several decades. In 1996, he was appointed to the Cornelia and Arthur L. Jung Chair in Mechanical Engineering, one of Tulane’s endowed professorships.

At Tulane, Watts specialized in subjects including energy systems, climate modeling, sea ice processes, and the physics of sports such as baseball and American football. He authored and edited several books in these fields, including Engineering Response to Global Climate Change (1997) and Global Warming and the Future of the Earth (2007).

In addition to his teaching at Tulane, Watts held visiting fellowships and research positions, including as a National Science Foundation Faculty Fellow at Harvard University in 1970 and as a NASA Summer Faculty Fellow at the Lewis Research Center during the late 1960s and early 1970s.

He retired as Professor Emeritus of Mechanical Engineering at Tulane University.

== Research ==
In 1969 he accepted a National Science Foundation Senior Post Doctoral Fellowship to study high temperature physics at Harvard University, but Dr. Richard Goody, with whom he intended to study, left the university that year. Left with an office among atmospheric scientists and oceanographers, he became interested in meteorology and oceanography, and began doing research in these areas.

In 1976 he was invited to spend a year at the Institute for Energy Analysis in Oak Ridge, where he became interested in paleoclimatology and in the problem of global warming. He served as a visiting scientist at the International Institute for Applied Systems Analysis in Vienna, the Institute for Energy Analysis in Oak Ridge and Batelle Northwest Laboratories in DC. He is the originator and past director of the National Institute for Global Environmental Change, South Central Region at Tulane University.

He was a member of the ASME Committee on Environmental Heat Transfer starting in 1975 and was a frequent contributor to the Journal of Geophysical Research and to Climatic Change as well as the engineering literature.

He had research interests in and published in the fields of human response to environmental risk and in carbon-free global energy supply.

In the late 1980s after his study of oceanography, Watts became aware that since the mass of the ocean is thousands of times the mass of the atmosphere the two must affect one another strongly. His editorial, “Is the greenhouse gas-climate signal hiding in the deep ocean?” pointed out that It appears that as the climate changes, dramatic changes in the locations of atmospheric actions such as storms and drought have moved toward the East in the United States. He suggested that ongoing climate change may be associated with shifts in the geographic patterns of storms and drought in the United States and with changes in Atlantic hurricane tracks, and he has emphasized that climate models should represent the full Earth system, including ocean–atmosphere interactions, to reliably assess future change.

== Marriage and children ==
In 1962, Watts married Judith Annette Hodes; they had three children—Adam Friedrich, Jenifer Isabel, and Rachel McCaleb—and divorced in 1978. In 1980, he married Jean Elizabeth Kloepfer Baringer, his college sweetheart, who had two children from a previous marriage.

== Awards and honors ==
Watts has received numerous academic and professional honors during his career, including:

- ASME–Pi Tau Sigma Outstanding Teacher Award (1972–73; 1984–85; 2004–05)
- NSF Science Faculty Fellow, Harvard University (1970)
- NASA Summer Faculty Fellow, NASA Lewis Research Center (1967–68; 1968–69; 1970–71)
- Inaugural Member, ASME Distinguished Lecturer Series
- Cornelia and Arthur L. Jung Chair in Mechanical Engineering, Tulane University (since 1996)
- George Hawkins Memorial Lecturer, Purdue University (April 6, 2000)
- Fellow of the American Society of Mechanical Engineers (ASME) (2009)
- Dixie Lee Ray Award for environmental contributions, ASME (2009)

== Selected publications ==
Watts has authored and co-authored several books and many peer-reviewed journal articles in engineering, climate science, and sports physics:

=== Books ===
- Watts, R. G.; Bahill, A. T. (1991). Keep Your Eye on the Ball: The Science and Folklore of Baseball. New York: W. H. Freeman. ISBN 0716720631.
- Watts, R. G. (ed.) (1997). Engineering Response to Global Climate Change. Boca Raton, FL: CRC Press. ISBN 156032567X.
- Watts, R. G.; Bahill, A. T. (2000). Keep Your Eye on the Ball: Curve Balls, Knuckleballs, and Fallacies of Baseball. New York: W. H. Freeman. ISBN 978-0716737175.
- Watts, R. G. (2007). Global Warming and the Future of the Earth. Synthesis Lectures on Renewable Energy. Springer. doi:10.1007/978-3-031-79417-9
- Watts, R.G. (2019). Growing up Southern: The Clash of Cultures in Rural and Urban America. Self-published. ISBN 978-1-7946-1893-0.
- Watts, R. G. (2012). Essentials of Applied Mathematics for Scientists and Engineers (2nd ed.). Morgan & Claypool. ISBN 9781608457952.
- Watts, R. G. (ed.) (2002). Innovative Energy Strategies for CO₂ Stabilization. Cambridge, MA: MIT Press. ISBN 978-0-262-23224-1.

=== Selected Journal articles ===
- Watts, R. G.; Hsu, Y. Y. (1974). "Compressibility of a translating bubble in an oscillating pressure field." Journal of the Acoustical Society of America. 56 (2): 339–345. doi:10.1121/1.1903285
- Watts, R. G.; Sawyer, E. (1975). "Aerodynamics of a knuckleball." American Journal of Physics. 43 (11): 960–963. doi:10.1119/1.10023
- Farhi, I.; Watts, R. G. (1975). "Relaxation times for stationary evaporating liquid droplets." Journal of Applied Physics. 46 (9): 3739–3743. doi:10.1063/1.321345
- Van Buskirk, W.C.; Watts, R.G. ; Liu, Y. K. " The fluid mechanics of the semicircular canals." Journal of Fluid Mechanics, 78 (1) : 87-98.
- Watts, R. G.; Ferrer, R. (1987) "The lateral force on a spinning sphere: Aerodynamics of a curveball." American Journal of Physics. 55 (1): 40-44.
- Medjani, K.; Watts, R. G. (1993). "Freezing of the NaCl–H₂O binary compound from above in a partially open cylindrical geometry." International Journal of Heat and Mass Transfer. 36 (11): 2815–2824. doi:10.1016/0017-9310(93)90273-M
- RG Watts, MC Morantine. (1993) " Is the greenhouse gas-climate signal hiding in the deep ocean? Re-Addressing the Issue". Climatic change. 25 (1).
- Morantine, M. C.; Watts, R. G. (1994). "Timescales in energy balance climate models: II. The intermediate time solutions." Journal of Geophysical Research: Atmospheres. 99 (D2): 3705–3714. doi:10.1029/93JD02174
- Watts, R. G.; Oertling, A. B. (2004). "Growth of and brine drainage from NaCl–H₂O freezing: A simulation of young sea ice." Journal of Geophysical Research: Oceans. 109 (C4). doi:10.1029/2002JC001513
- Watts, R. G.; Moore, G. (2003). "The drag force on an American football." American Journal of Physics. 71 (8): 791–793. doi:10.1119/1.1578072
