= Meet the Natives: USA =

- Genre: Reality
- Country of origin: United States
- Original language: English
- No. of seasons: 1
- No. of episodes: 6

Production
- Executive producer: Charlie Parsons
- Running time: 45 minutes

Original release
- Network: Travel Channel
- Release: November 29 – December 20, 2009

Meet the Natives: USA is an American reality television series that premiered on the Travel Channel on November 29, 2009. The series follows five tribesmen from the island of Tanna, Vanuatu, as they travel to the United States on an adventure to explore America and the American way of life. During their visit to America, tribesmen intended to spread the message of peace and kindness that they had been taught by a foreigner known as "Tom Navy".

== History ==
Meet the Natives is a reality television show that first aired in September 2007 on Channel 4 in the United Kingdom. This series included five tribesmen, Yapa, Joel, JJ, Posen and Albi, from the island of Tanna who travel to England to participate in an experiment which Guy Adams of The Independent called reverse anthropology. The series has three episodes in which they visited a Norfolk pig farm, a Manchester estate, and Chillingham Castle in Northumberland.

Meet the Natives: USA is a spin-off of the UK version of this television series in which a second group of Tanna tribesmen, Chief Mangau, Keimua, Sam, Kuai and Namus, travel to the United States, this time on a quest to learn more about the land and also share their ideas and beliefs. Meet the Natives: USA aired on the Travel Channel in November and December 2009.

== Episodes ==
No.	Title	Original release date
1	"Montana"	November 29, 2009
For their first stop, the tribesmen traveled to a cattle farm in Montana. During their visit, they learned how Americans raise and maintain farms. The tribe did not like the fact that medicine is injected into the cows that people actually eat for the fear of "spoiling the body".
2	"New York"	November 29, 2009
The men visited New York's upper class area where they meet Bunny, who lives alone while her husband is away on business and her children are away at college. Bunny introduces them to the art of painting. The tribe starts to realize that America lives off of money. They take interest in an individual who is homeless and quickly explain how their culture would not allow for an individual to be homeless.
3	"Peoria"	December 6, 2009
In Peoria, the tribesmen get the chance to experience Thanksgiving. While helping cook the meal, they have some concerns with the way in which the food had been stored. They were particularly concerned with using a plastic oven bag to cook the turkey in for the fear of being poisoned. They also were shocked that people ate food that has been stored in tin cans for months, maybe even years. They realized that the way Americans cook is very different from the way they are used to cooking.
4	"Orange County"	December 13, 2009
The men travel to Orange County, California where they experience the life of being pampered with pedicures, facials and mud baths. They also play golf, observe a home Botox party, and ride roller coasters at Knott's Berry Farm. They notice that there is a lot of food available as well as the usage of cars for almost everything.
5	"Fort Stewart"	December 20, 2009
The tribesmen travel to Fort Stewart and Washington, D.C., where they learn more about the war that America is fighting and they also give advice on keeping peace. They explain that they do not agree with people fighting other people and they vigorously try to relay the message that America should put the guns down and keep peace. They speak with Colin Powell to try to get their message across to the people of America.
6	"Reflections"	December 20, 2009
The group reflects back on the experience they had while visiting America. They express that they know there are some differences, but for the most part people in America are loving and very welcoming individuals. They also reflect back on the "big animals" of America, such as the buffalo, and their first time seeing snow. While in the U.S they loved eating ice cream and sweets such as candy. They are preparing to go back home and tell the rest of their tribe about their experience and everything they learned about American culture.

== Cast ==
Chief Mangau is the chief of the tribe and its elder and leader. He was sent with the others by his father, the supreme chief of the tribe back in Tanna. His purpose of going on this journey with the other four men was to serve as a leader and to help keep the rest of the men on track. He is the oldest of the five men at the age of 65 years.

Keimua serves as the "head dancer" of the group. Back in Tanna he helps coordinate dance routines and teaches the children of the tribe how to do the traditional dances. In America he brings smiles to many faces with charm and love for dancing.

Sam is the "medicine man" of the tribe and serves as somewhat of a doctor of the tribe. During his visit to the United States he was specifically interested in how Americans treat themselves of different infections and diseases. He gave advice and shared the different treatments that his tribe has traditionally used throughout the tribe's history.

Kuai serves as the "happy man" of the tribe. He is known for spreading happiness and jokes. In Tanna his purpose is to help keep the tribe happy in times of sadness and also everyday life. While in the United States he kept the families that they were staying with laughing and kept the field open for memorable moments.

Namus is the translator of the group. Holding one of the most important roles of the group he helps to connect the two worlds together. As a young child he went away to school to learn English. He is the youngest of the group, aged 27.

== Tanna ==
Flag of the Island of Tanna

Tanna is an island of Vanuatu located near the island of Aniwa. The people of Tanna are mainly Melanesian. The culture of Vanuatu is mostly rural with a tribal setting. In each village there is usually a chief who holds the highest rank in the tribe. The chief is chosen based on ability, gender, and age; an older man usually holds this position. The military experience of Vanuatu includes troops serving only occasionally and only as peacekeepers; they are known as The Vanuatu Mobile Force. Men and women tend to hold very traditional roles regarding family and living together. The men hunt and gather food while women stay home and tend to the house chores and children. The marriage rate is close to 100% and marriages are usually arranged by the family. Babies are usually nursed until the age of three and both parents take part in raising the child. If there are older siblings, however, they tend to take on the role as caregivers.

== Tom Navy ==
"Tom Navy" is one of the major reasons for the tribesmen's visit to the United States. The tribe has learned that America is at war and they want to return the message of keeping peace that the U.S had given them once before. During World War II, the Americans helped to keep the tribe at peace during a time when the tribe was fighting. "Tom Navy" is described as an African American serviceman who helped the tribe during this time. During their visit to America the tribe had wished to meet Tom Navy to thank him for his help, provided during hard times. The show's executive producer, Charlie Parsons, guessed that back during the war there was a man by the name of Tom, who was from the Navy and his name was understood by the tribe as being Tom Navy.

Others hold that "Tom Navy" is a figure like John Frum, associated with the cargo cults that sprouted after World War II, when American forces in the Pacific theatre set up airbases on various islands, often softening up the natives for their arrival presence with goodwill air drops, and inspiring awe and even worship from natives for their speedy arrival, transcendent presence, and an exit that was just as quick.
