= Vailala Madness =

Social movement in the Papuan Gulf, in the Territory of Papua

The Vailala Madness was a social movement in the Territory of Papua, which is in the Papuan Gulf, beginning in the later part of 1919 and declining after 1922. It was the first well-documented cargo cult, a class of millenarian religion-political movements.

== Name ==
The name of the movement, the Vailala Madness, was based on observations of the behavior of people who participated in it, notably speaking in tongues (glossolalia) and loss of bodily control such as body shaking. In the indigenous language, the body shaking is termed iki haveva, or "belly-don't know", roughly meaning "dizziness".

== Return of the Ancestors ==
Central to the movement was the belief that a 'Ghost Steamer' piloted by the returning dead would soon arrive, bringing with it a cargo that would not only contain departed relatives, but also tinned food, tools, and various other resources. Some followers of the movement also believed that the cargo would include guns that they could use to expel the colonizers.

== White ancestors ==
The movement believed that the ancestors who returned with the ship would be white, like the European colonials—a belief that typically recurs in post-war cargo cults. It was possible to communicate with these ancestors using a 'flag pole'—a tall pole, attached by cane to the movement's 'office'. An expatriate observer suggested that such a pole was an imitation of contemporary European wireless sets, and claimed to have seen a pumpkin hoisted up the pole for transmission to the ancestors. However, Albert Maori Kiki, who grew up in the area, suggested that this device was actually related to a myth whereby Morning Star used a long string of cane to come from his home, which is distant, to the village to meet a woman he was attracted to.

== Regulation of life after colonial fashion ==
Another aspect of the movement which presages features of later cargo cults is the so-called "imitation of the white man". The leaders of the movement would drill the rank and file as if they were soldiers, they enforced a curfew after the manner of regimented life at plantations, and they held a ceremony which looked for all intents and purposes like having tea in the European fashion. A table would be decorated with crotons, and food would be served for the participants to eat while sitting on stools. According to Francis Edgar Williams, the anthropologist who observed this, under no other circumstances would an indigenous person suffer through sitting at a table in this way. However, there was no explanation linking this to the ancestors, for instance. This illustrates another aspect of cargo cults, which is that some activities described as cargo cults could be rituals with secret meanings, or their description as such could be an outcome of the observer's expectation of secret meanings.

== Strict moral code ==
Some reports suggested that the movement led to widespread sexual violence, but this cannot be verified. Indeed, the movement officially taught a strict moral code, which included the prohibition of adultery and other moral offenses. Such offenses would be rectified by fines levied by the leaders of the movement. To discover who had committed any sin, these leaders organized divining ceremonies which involved a log, held by several men, which was said to have the capacity to seek out anyone who had guilt.

This resulted in the movement being classified as a form of extortion by the colonial administration. This offense was added to that of 'spreading false rumors,' punishable under the legal code of the Australian Papua territory. Several of the leaders were in fact jailed, for an unknown period of time.

== Abandonment of ceremonies ==
The Vailala Madness also took a rigid line on the abandonment of the great cycle of initiations that were formerly a center of social life in the Papuan Gulf. The cycle, known as hevehe and semese, would take over a decade to complete and involved the building of a huge man's cultic house, known as the eravo, in which were put ritual paraphernalia that were prohibited to women. The Vailala Madness destroyed the paraphernalia, and often the first step towards this was displaying the forbidden items to the non-initiated.

== Source of these beliefs ==
The source of the model of organization incorporating drills, curfews and tea was most likely observed by the leaders of the movement whilst working in plantations far away from the Papuan Gulf, where they also picked up Tok Pisin. It is likely that there they also learned about the war with Germany, since the glossolalia was described as "djaman". It has been suggested that ideas about 'cargo' - specifically, the belief that it was diverted from the ancestors by whites - emerged within the context of the plantation indigenous labor force.

It is clear that Christianity, which had been introduced by Rev. James Chalmers in the 1890s, had a profound effect on the people, and it is possible that a number of ideas in the moral code stemmed from it. The movement set out to "throw'em away bloody new guinea somethings", which should not be interpreted as the internalization of colonialist ideology. In fact, colonialist ideology in Papua demanded that indigenous society remain relatively stable within tradition and culture, and for this reason, the Vailala Madness was considered to be a troubling indicator that society might collapse under the pressure of change.

== Observers and the end of the movement ==
The movement was observed first hand by G. M. Murray in 1919, the Acting Resident Magistrate for the Kerema Patrol Station. Francis Edgar Williams, the Government Anthropologist of the Australian Papuan administration, arrived in 1922, at which time the movement was still strong, though already showing signs of disintegration. By the late 1920s, it was no longer active. However, other religious and social innovations continued to pass through the Papuan Gulf before WWII.

== See also ==
- Ghost Dance, a belief extended among North American Indians that, in its Sioux version, prophesied that the ancestors would come back by train.
- John Frum, a later cargo cult.
