= The Trumpet Shall Sound =

1957 sociology book

The Trumpet Shall Sound: A study of 'cargo' cults in Melanesia
- Author: Peter Worsley
- Language: English
- Publisher: MacGibbon & Kee
- Publication date: 1957
- Publication place: United Kingdom
- ISBN: 9780805201567

The Trumpet Shall Sound: A Study of "Cargo" Cults in Melanesia is a noted sociology/social anthropology book by Peter Worsley on the development and features of cargo cults in Melanesia in mid-20th century. The book analyzes the social, historical, and religious context of these movements, examining their origins, development, and significance.

Central to his analysis is millenarianism; that is the belief in the dawning of a new era and/or the imminent end of an old era. In his analysis he looks at prophetic leadership, ritualistic practices, and the impact of colonialism on indigenous societies. This work has an important legacy for those seeking to understand of cargo cults and their broader implications for the study of religion, social movements, and the impact of globalization. Read argues that his key argument is that these "cargo" cults are forms of social protest on the part of a depressed class. These depressed classes are typically disenchanted with existing socioeconomic orders, but they lack the practical means of achieving their objectives. These objectives are increased material wealth, social equality, and political power. As Elkin notes Worsley is he uses the “analytical tools forged by Marx ".

The contents include: The Tuka movement of Fiji; Millenarism and social change; Early movements in New Guinea;The Vailala madness;Spread and development; The continuity of the cults : Buka; The coming of the Japanese; The movements in the New Hebrides; From millennium to politics; A period of transition; Conclusions.

The volume is prefaced by a quote from St Paul's First Epistle to the Corinthians 15:51-52 (King James) Behold, I show you a mystery: We shall not all sleep; but we shall all be changed in a moment, in the twinkling of an eye, at the last trumpet. For the trumpet shall sound, and the dead shall be raised incorruptible, and we shall be changed.
