= Kenelm Burridge =

Maltese-born Canadian anthropologist (1922–2019)

Kenelm Oswald Lancelot Burridge (October 31, 1922 – May 21, 2019) was a Maltese-born Canadian anthropologist.

== Biography ==
Kenelm Burridge was born in October 1922 in Malta. After a childhood in Lucknow, India, he attended school in Great Britain. Burridge enlisted in the Royal Navy in 1939, serving throughout World War II. Although his ship, HMS Splendid, was sunk off Naples, Italy in 1943 and he was captured, Burridge escaped, returned to naval service, and retired as a lieutenant three years later.

He entered Exeter College, Oxford University in 1946, receiving a B.A. in 1948 in social anthropology, followed by a B.Litt. in 1950 and an M.A. in 1952 in anthropology. In 1954 he received his Ph.D. in anthropology from the Australian National University, Canberra; it was one of that university's first two doctorates, with the other going to astronomer Antoni Przybylski.

Burridge conducted fieldwork in Papua New Guinea, Malaysia (where he was a research fellow at the University of Malaysia), Australia, New Hebrides, and India. His main interests during his scholarly career were the ethnography of Oceania, and Malaya; religion; Millennialism; social and symbolic organization; anthropological history and theory; myth; museology; and missionaries and missiology. Many of his studies have looked specifically at millenarianism and cargo cults, and religious aspects of cultural change. As John Barker writes in the Association for Social Anthropology in Oceania's 1991 Newsletter, Burridge's "most ambitious book, Someone, No One, (1979), combines anthropology, history, philosophy and theology in a nuanced understanding of the dynamics of being an individual."

After teaching at Baghdad University and Oxford University, he served as a professor of anthropology at the University of British Columbia from 1968 until retiring and assuming emeritus status in 1987. Burridge also served as visiting lecturer or professor at the University of Western Australia, Princeton University, and International Christian University in Tokyo. In 1977, he was elected a fellow of the Royal Society of Canada. He died in May 2019 at the age of 96.

== Books ==
Submariners written under the name James Casing published 1951

- Mambu. A Melanesian Millennium. Methuen, 1960. (Reprinted as Mambu. A Melanesian Millennium. Princeton, Princeton Univ. Press, 1995. ISBN 0-691-00166-9.)
- Tangu Traditions. A Study In The Way of Life, Mythology and Developing Experience of A New Guinea People. Oxford, Clarendon Press, 1969, ISBN 0-19-823136-9.
- New Heaven, New Earth. A Study of Millenarian Activities. Oxford, Basil Blackwell, 1969, ISBN 0-631-11960-4.
- Encountering Aborigines. A Case Study: Anthropology and the Australian Aboriginal. Pergamon Press, 1973, ISBN 0-08-017646-1.
- Someone, No One: An Essay on Individuality. Princeton University Press, 1979, ISBN 0-691-09384-9.
- In The Way: A Study of Christian Missionary Endeavours. University of British Columbia Press, 1991, ISBN 0-7748-0376-2.
