= God Is American =

- Directed by: Richard Martin-Jordan
- Written by: Richard Martin-Jordan
- Produced by: Palladium Productions
- Release date: 2007
- Running time: 52 min
- Country: France
- Language: French

God Is American (French: Dieu est américain) is a 2007 French documentary film written, directed and produced by Richard Martin-Jordan. The film is about a religion invented in Vanuatu in the South Pacific.

== Plot ==
The documentary examines a religion practiced on Tanna, an island in the Vanuatu archipelago. Its followers pray in front of an American flag to a prophet named John Frum. According to believers, Frum was an American pilot who once landed on the island, who return one day with bounty they call the Cargo.

== Criticism ==
The shooting of that film was controversial in Vanuatu; the film was accused of being pseudo-anthropological. Some viewers on the YouTube version of this film have noted that the captions incorrectly translate the subjects' Bislama words into English, and other viewers have pointed out that the narrator takes a condescending view towards the people who are the film's subjects.

== Awards ==
This film was selected in 95 festivals worldwide, it has won 20 awards:

- Toulon International Film Festival (Toulon) / France (November 2007) : Jury Special Award 2007
- Festival « Etonnant Voyageur » (St-Malo) / France (May 2008) : Winner of a star at the scam (French civil society of multimedia authors)
- Honolulu International Film Festival (Honolulu) / Hawaii (Mars 2009) : Gold Kahuna prize for the excellence of filmmaking
- The Accolade Competition (La Jolla, Californie) / USA (Avril 2009) : Award of excellence
- Mexico International Film Festival (Baja, Californie) / USA (Avril 2009) : Bronze palm award
- Twin Rivers Media Festival (Twin Rivers, Caroline du Nord) / USA (Mai 2009) : Fourth place
- Yosemite Film Festival (Yosemite, Californie) / USA (Sept 2009) : Silver Sierra Award 2009
- The Indie Film Festival (La Jolla, Californie) / USA (Sept 2009) : Award of Merit “honouring outstanding craft and creativity in film”.
- Nevada Film Festival (Las Vegas, Nevada) / USA (Oct. 2009) : Golden Reel Award Winner
- Mountain Film Festival (Colorado) / USA (Février 2010) : Jury Prize Documentary Competition
- Canada international Film Festival (Vancouver) / Canada (Mars 2010) : Award of Excellence in Film Making
- Sene film music and arts festival (Rhode Island) / USA (Avril 2010) : Award for Best Documentary Film
- Independent Film Awards / USA (2015) Honorable Mention : Winner
- WorldFest-Houston International Film Festival (Texas) / USA (Avril 2015) : Gold Remi Winner
- ColorTape International Film Festival (Mansfield) / Australie (Avril 2015) : People's Choice Award
- Filmmakers World Film Festival – Indonesia (2016) - Diamond Award
- HIFF – Headline International Film Festival (Décembre 2015) - Honorable Mention Winner
- Java Film Awards – Indonésie (2018) – Golden Award
- FICCSUR Southern Cone International Film Festival – Valparaíso/ Chili (Mai 2018) – Prix du Meilleur Documentaire
- Eurasia International Film Festival – Moscow September 2018 – Prix du Meilleur Documentaire
