= Peter Lawrence (anthropologist) =

Australian anthropologist

Peter Lawrence (1921 – 21 December 1987) was a British-Australian anthropologist and pioneer in the study of Melanesian religions.

Lawrence was born in Lancashire, and read classics at the University of Cambridge. Between 1942 and 1946, he served in the Royal Navy before returning to Cambridge at the end of World War II. He conducted his first fieldwork among the Garia people in southern Madang Province, Papua New Guinea in 1949–1950. Supervised by Meyer Fortes, he received his PhD in 1951 with a thesis entitled "Social structure and the process of social control among the Garia, Madang District, New Guinea".

Lawrence held teaching positions at the Australian National University (1948-1957), Australian School of Pacific Administration (from 1957), University of Western Australia (1960-1963), University of Queensland (1966-1970), and University of Sydney (1963-1965 and 1970–1986).

Lawrence became a prominent academic in Australia and abroad. He was elected a Fellow of the Academy of Social Sciences in 1967 and an Honorary Fellow of the Association for the Social Anthropology of Oceania. He also became the editor of Oceania, the first anthropology journal in Australia, in 1980. He died of a stroke in Sydney.

A portrait of him painted in 1938 by Tempe Manning is held by the National Library of Australia.
