= Pacific Islands home front during World War II =

Effects on Melanesia, Micronesia and Polynesia

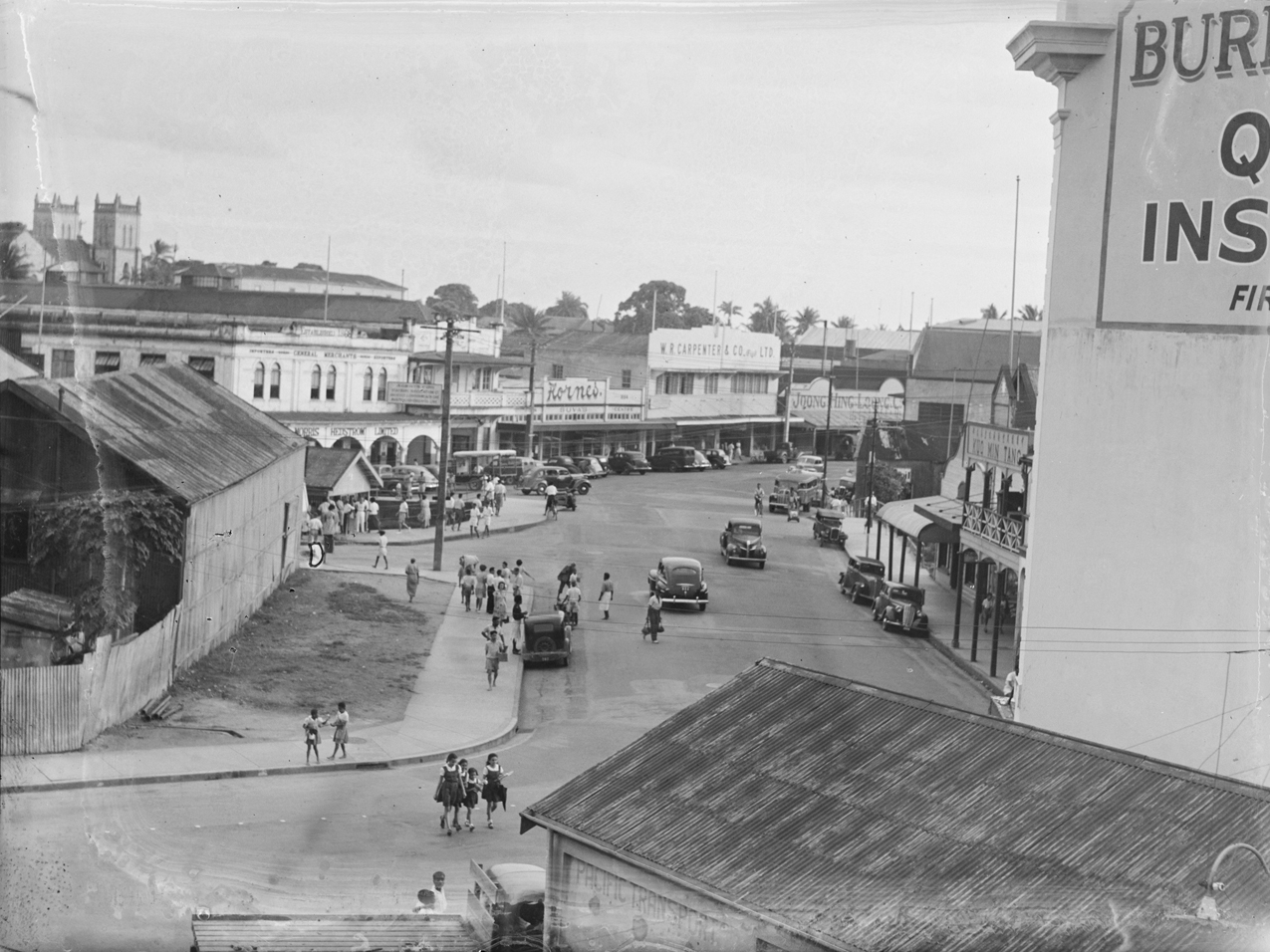
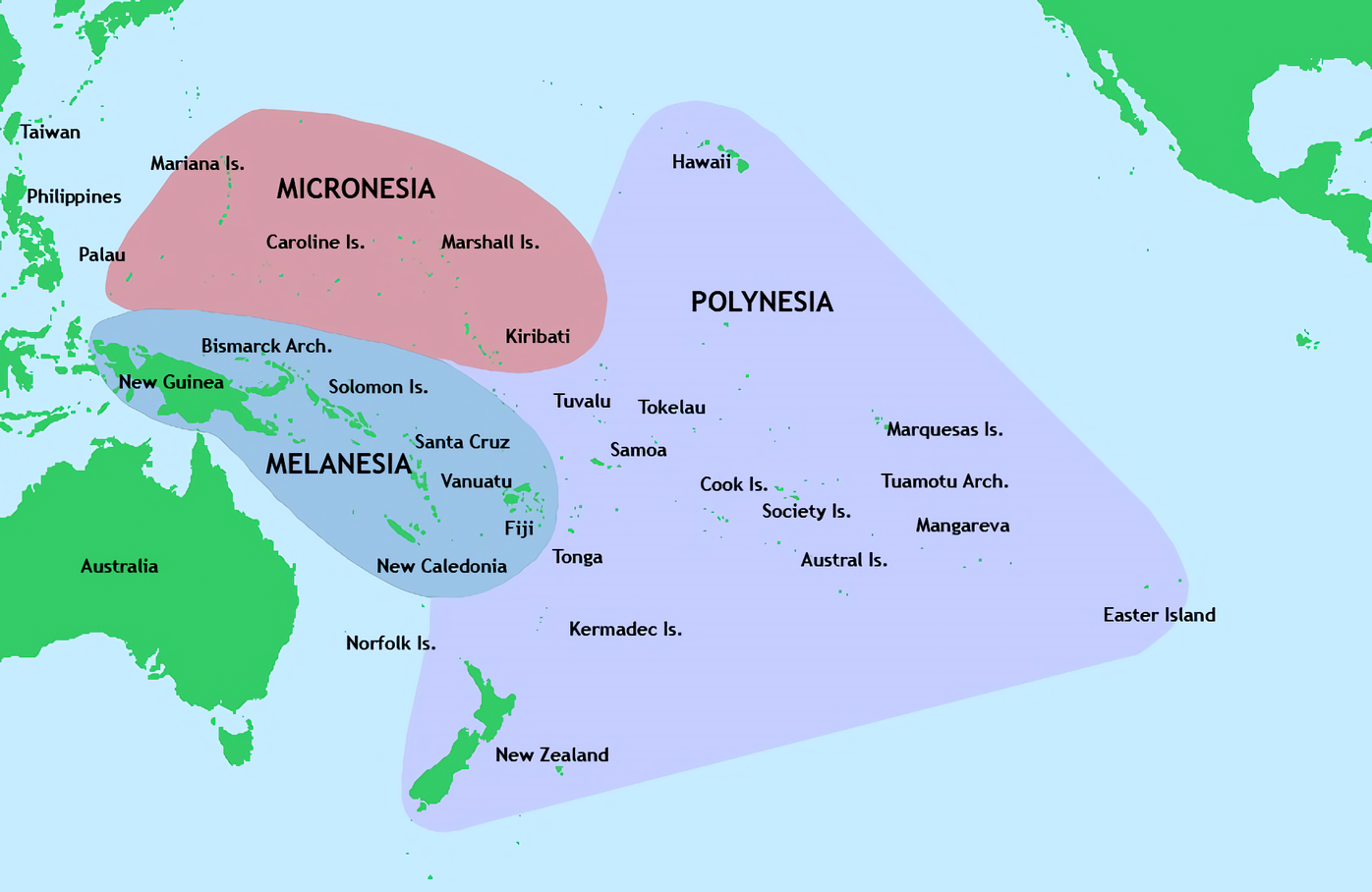
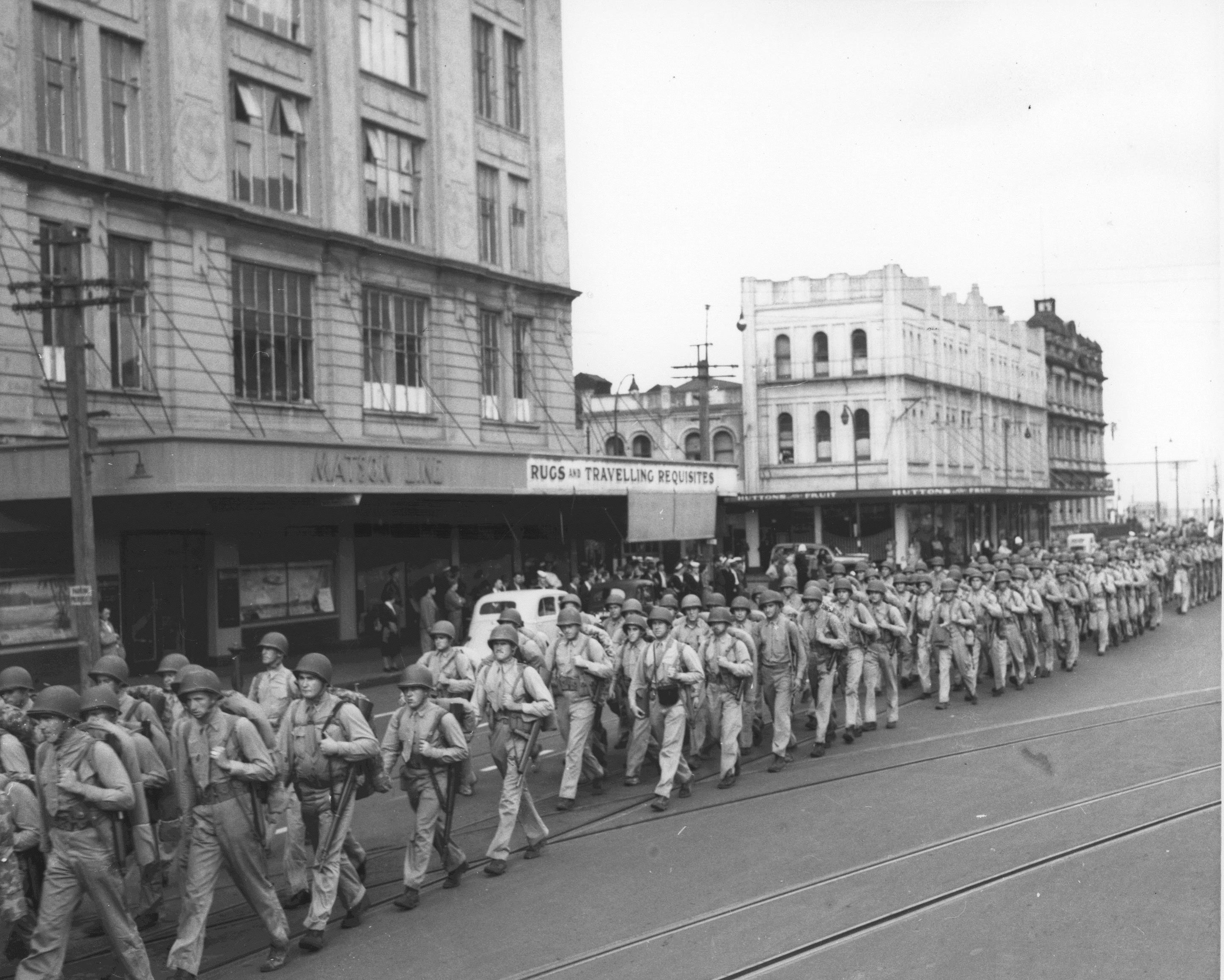
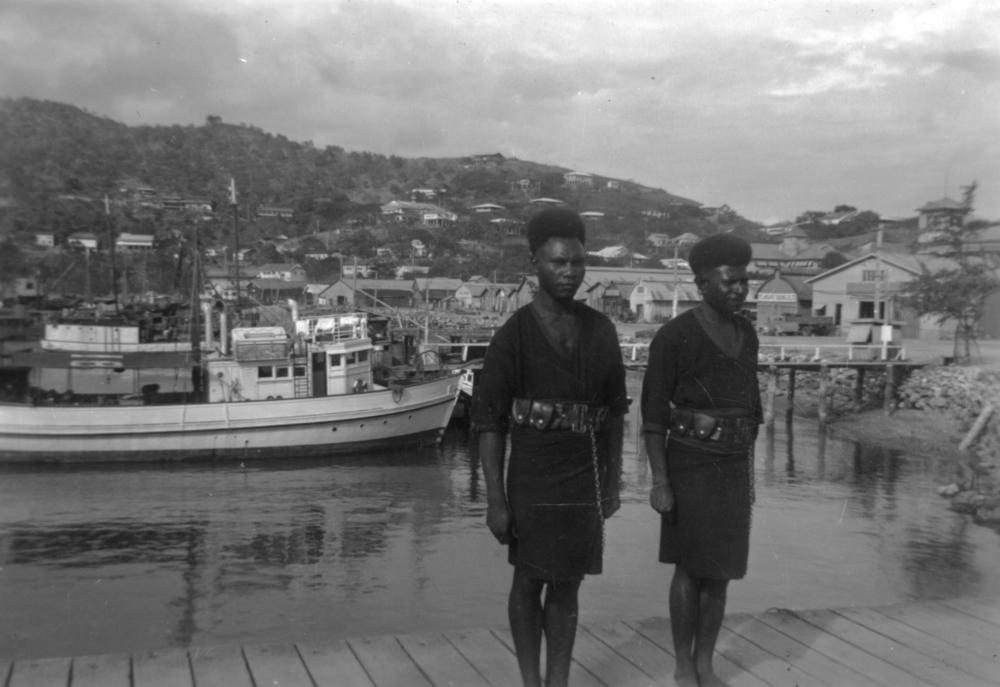
Clockwise from upper left: Suva (c. 1940), ethnic groups of the Pacific Ocean, Papuans at the Port Moresby harbourside (1946), American parade through Auckland

The civilian population, culture and infrastructure of Melanesia, Micronesia and Polynesia (Pacific Islands) were completely changed between 1941 and 1945 because of the logistical requirements of the Allies in their war against Japan (taemfaet and daidowa in Micronesian or sahaya kana tuta in Melanesian). At the start of the war some of the islands had experienced up to 200 years of colonialism from Europe and its colonies, some on the verge of being fully annexed, others close to independence. The early Japanese expansion through the western Pacific then introduced a new colonial system to many islands. The Japanese occupation subjected the indigenous people of Guam and other Pacific Islands to forced labor, family separation, incarceration, execution, concentration camps, and forced prostitution.

The Pacific Islands then experienced military action, massive troop movements, and limited resource extraction and building projects as the Allies pushed the Japanese back to their home islands. The juxtaposition of all these cultures led to a new understanding among the indigenous Pacific Islanders of their relationship with the colonial powers.

== Prior to 1941 ==
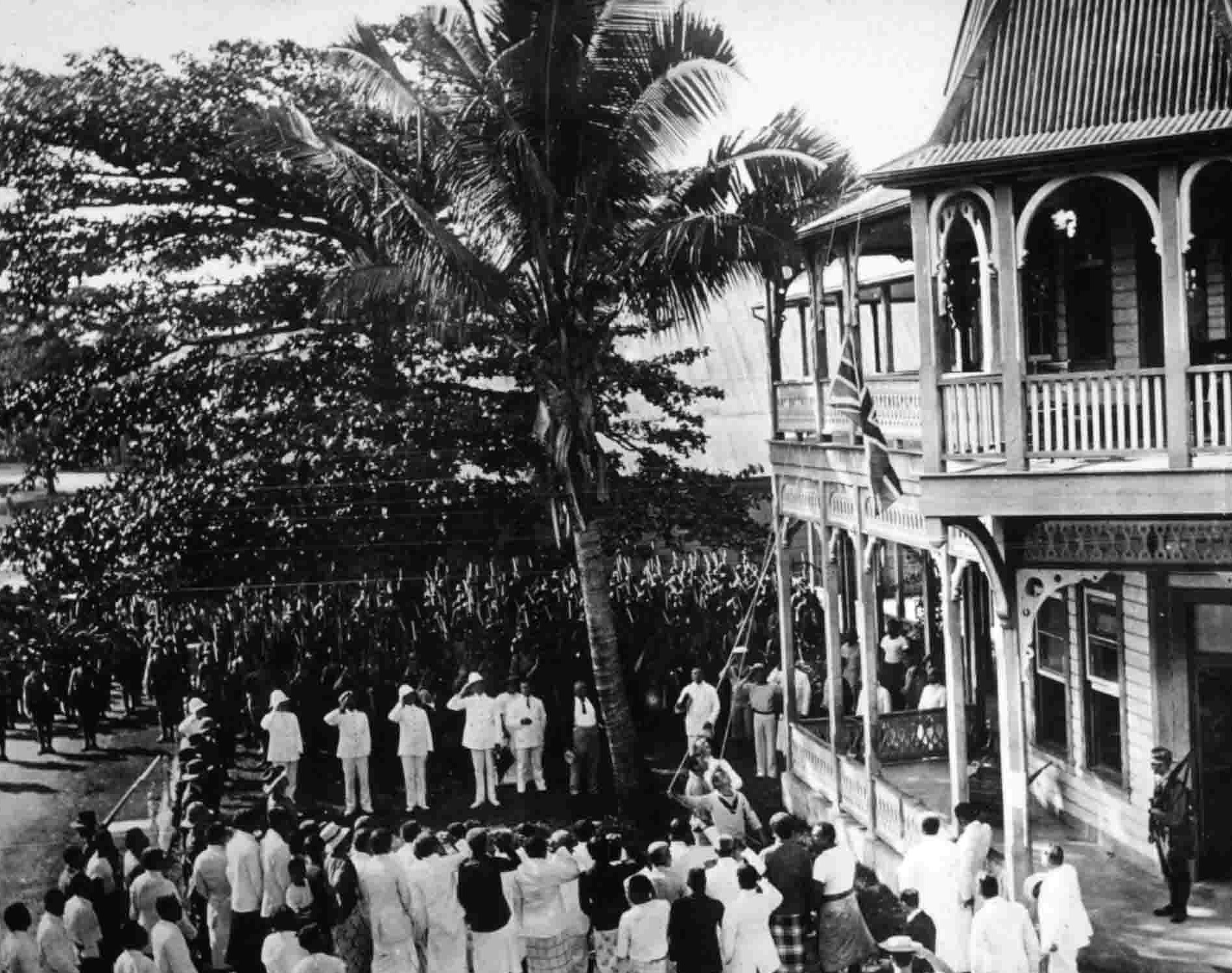
Occupation of German-Samoa, 1914

By 1941 the Pacific Islands had been on the periphery of many wars between the great powers of Europe and America. Japan slowly extended its influence along the margins of the western Pacific for much of the 20th century leading up to World War II. After the initial scramble for positions by the Spanish, Dutch, English and French in the 19th century, Guam was ceded to America by Spain in 1899 and German-Samoa changed hands to become a New Zealand colony during the First World War.

By 1941 Christianity had spread to every inhabited island and had been adopted to varying extents, but the interior of New Guinea was largely unexplored by Europeans. However, the rest of the Pacific was fully in the control of colonial powers, as the Pacific Islands were comparatively slow in the creation of independence movements.

== After 1941 ==
Guam came under intense bombardment just hours after the devastating attack on Pearl Harbor and fell to Imperial Japanese forces two days later. For more than two years, the people of Guam endured unspeakable atrocities at the hands of the enemy: forced labor, starvation, imprisonment, and persecution. Yet, they refused to lose hope. That reign of tyranny began to crumble on the morning of July 21, 1944, when—following weeks of relentless air and naval bombardment by a powerful fleet of battleships, cruisers, and destroyers—nearly 55,000 Marines, sailors, and soldiers landed to retake the island and raise the American flag.

== Attitude of the visiting armies ==
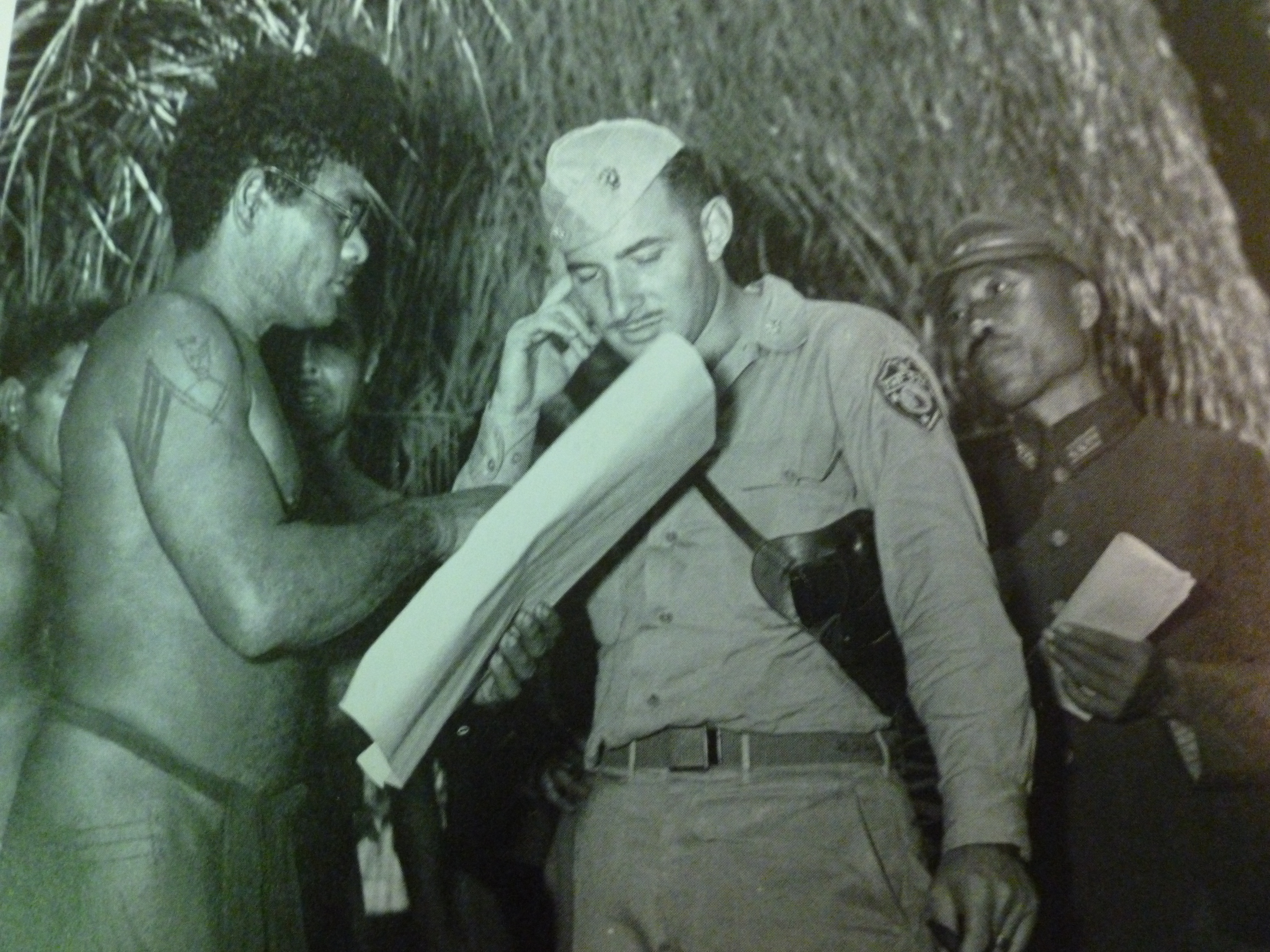
Native Micronesians in the Pacific War during Japanese surrender on Woleai

Because of the vast amount of information recorded by the Allied armies in comparison with the local populations of the Pacific, many of the events of the time are seen from their perspective. It had been decided that Britain and its colonies would have a secondary role in the Pacific, so it was mostly Americans that passed through the islands on their way to war. They appeared in the Pacific largely unannounced because of security concerns. In the view of one French colonist "if Martians had landed among us we would not have been more surprised".

Most of the military personnel from the continental U.S. had never before left their homeland or experienced any culture other than their own. Americans experienced the Pacific Islands including the U.S. organized incorporated territory of Hawaii through cinema and books which divided the inhabitants into submissive hula dancers or cannibals. Also the American military was segregated at this time, further leading to the culture shock that awaited many in the Pacific Islands. American views on race also led to disagreements among the Allies, as New Zealand officers would have dinner with their Fijian counterparts, while Americans would not. Similar racial tension led to a riot in Wellington, New Zealand, when American soldiers would not allow Māori into the Allied Services Club.

Once the servicemen arrived they quibbled about their disillusionment with local women and never fully changed their preconceptions of local men. As John F. Kennedy reported from the Solomon Islands "Have a lot of natives around and am getting hold of grass skirts, war clubs, etc. We had one in today who told us about the last man he ate". In the Solomon Islands by this stage of the war, the missionaries had been evacuated, which would have only increased misunderstandings between the Methodist locals and the new arrivals. While some foreign servicemen respected the locals for their fitness, friendliness and work ethic, most viewed the indigenous people as culturally and biologically inferior. However, as the American men were ordered to treat the locals fairly, and the visitors provided many economic opportunities, relations were almost always peaceful.

In order to prevent the spread of diseases such as malaria to the American troops in Melanesia, efforts were made to separate the two groups. Treatment was also given to locals for a variety of ailments in order to protect the servicemen. This, along with the perceived positive treatment of African Americans, led to a generally positive view of Americans among the populace of the Solomon Islands. This good opinion was only marred by infrequent theft of local goods, unwanted advances towards women and at least one instance of bestiality by American servicemen.

== Effects ==
=== Changes to culture ===
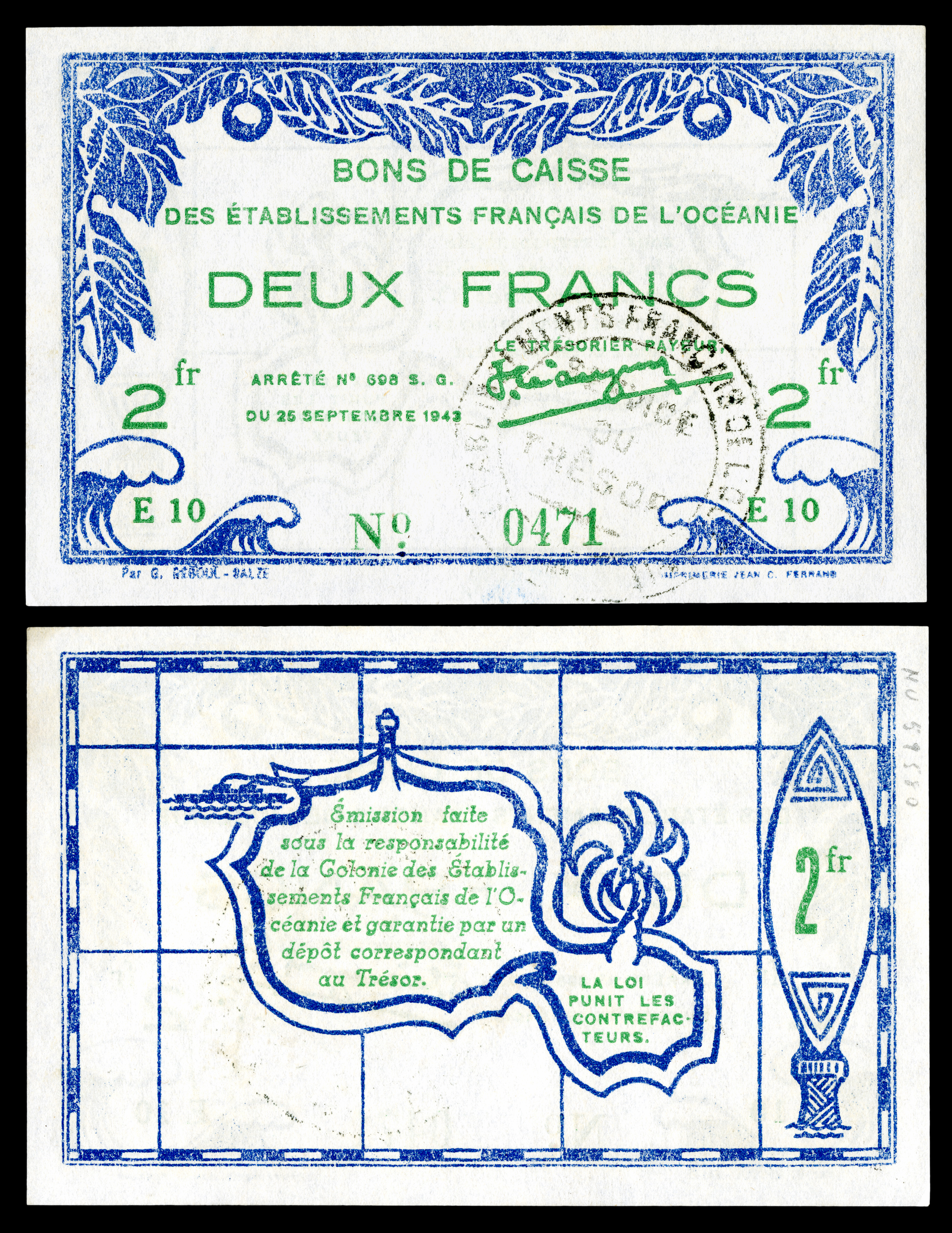
French Oceania, WWII emergency issue currency, 2 francs (1943). The note was printed in Papeete for use in the colony of French Oceania.

Generally the effect of informal interactions between the visiting armies and the local inhabitants had a far more lasting effect than the formal military activities. The sharp distinction between colonizer and colonized once broken, particularly by shared military service were hard to restore.

The home comforts the American military brought to the Pacific changed the aspirations of many local peoples. This included the eating habits of those in the Solomon Islands through to the fashion choices of women in New Zealand. In those societies like New Zealand, where a portion of the young men enlisted, as well as working in the fields and factories, women volunteered for Red Cross work and took up the professional positions left vacant by the men. In communities that had very little contact with Europeans before the war, the sudden arrival—and rapid departure—of such an unfathomable mass of men and machines had lasting religious effects, such as the so-called "cargo cults".

=== Employment ===
In New Caledonia employment by the military represented the first introduction to currency (46 cents per day) for many. This was accompanied with health care and training in many tasks including driving. This was seen as inappropriate and leading to arrogant behavior by some French colonists. Uniforms were also given to local workers as a way of creating discipline and a hierarchy.

The indigenous New Caledonians (Kanak) noted with interest that the African American soldiers, although segregated, could outrank white Americans. They judged this system as superior to the one they lived under during French rule. Asian indentured servants in New Caledonia could not officially be employed by the Americans; however, they were heavily involved in the black market supply of goods and labor that developed. Their absence put pressure on the efficiency of the local nickel mines.

In addition, French Polynesia and Wallis/Futuna sided with the Free French during the war and thousands of their residents joined the Free French Forces as the Bataillon du Pacifique (Pacific Battalion). It was part of the Free French Forces and served under the 1st Free French Division (1^{re} DFL), specifically within the 4th Brigade. In July 1942, the 1st Marine Infantry Battalion and the Pacific Battalion No. 1 were merged to form the Marine Infantry and Pacific Battalion (Bataillon d'infanterie de marine et du Pacifique. Caledonia, Niue, and French Guinea also sent their troops on behalf of the Allies. These troops fought in various battles from North Africa and Italy. As part of the Pacific War, Tongan, Fijian, and elements of the Solomon Islands trained troops and guerillas to fight against Japan. The employment of these troops helped create reforms for wage labor and the Allied military presence brought skills such as construction, driving, vocation, etc that became useful post-war.

=== Education ===
Advanced education on a level not previously seen in the territories Japan had colonized became readily accessible to their general populace during occupation, most notably in the region of Micronesia, where from 1922 to 1936 the number of primary schools increased from 3 to 23. The island of Bougainville and several local communities lying on the north coast of New Guinea saw their first elementary education during the early years of Japanese settlement. Michael Somare, the first prime minister of Papua New Guinea, claimed that he spent his first year of primary education being taught in a Japanese-language school.

=== Environmental impact ===
The deforestation, dumping of ordnance and spread of invasive species throughout the Pacific all affected the environment. On some small atolls, runways were built covering most of the available land. This along with the introduction of rats destroyed the breeding locations for many sea birds. The war in the Pacific was partly one for resources, the nickel in New Caledonia made the island a target attracting a U.S. occupation force.

== Aftermath ==
During the war, resources that could be reused in America were often sent back for recycling. However, at the end of the war an estimated nine million metric tonnes of American equipment still needed to be returned from the Pacific. Most of it was sold to the colonial governments or abandoned. In New Guinea reselling this scrap would be the only profitable business until the 1950s.

Arrival and departure of foreign troops
| Location | Military | Arrival | Departure | Population | Troop numbers | % | References |
|---|---|---|---|---|---|---|---|
| Fiji | New Zealand, United States of America | | | 259,638 | 12,000 | 5 | |
| Guam | Japan | December 1941 | August 1944 | 22,290 | 18,000 | 81 | |
| Hawaii | United States of America | Before 1939 | After 1945 | 423,330 | 253,000 | 60 | |
| New Caledonia | United States of America | March 1942 | June 1944 | 53,000 | 100,000 | 187 | |
| New Zealand | United States of America | June 1942 | July 1944 | 1,600,000 | 45,000 | 3 | |

== See also ==
- Home front during World War II
- Japanese occupation of Guam
- Japanese occupation of the Dutch East Indies
- United States home front during World War II
