= Peter Worsley =

British sociologist and anthropologist (1924–2013)

Peter Maurice Worsley (6 May 1924 – 15 March 2013) was a noted British sociologist and social anthropologist. He was a major figure in both anthropology and sociology, and is noted for introducing the term Third World into English. He not only made theoretical and ethnographic contributions, but also was regarded as a key founding member of the New Left.

== Early life and education ==
Born in Birkenhead, Worsley started reading English at Emmanuel College, Cambridge, but his studies were interrupted by World War II. He served in the British Army as an officer in Africa and India. During this time, he developed his interest in anthropology. After the war, he worked on mass education in Tanganyika and then went to study under Max Gluckman at the University of Manchester. He received his PhD from the Australian National University in Canberra.

== Career ==
He lectured in sociology at the University of Hull and then went on to become the first Professor of Sociology at the University of Manchester in 1964.

== Awards ==
Winner of the Curl Bequest Prize (1955) of the Royal Anthropological Institute for The kinship system of the Tallensi: a revaluation (Published in JRAI 1956, pp. 37–75).

== Key works ==
- Worsley, Peter (1957), The Trumpet Shall Sound: A study of 'cargo' cults in Melanesia, London: MacGibbon & Kee.Subsequent editions by MacGibbon & Kee, 1968; and Schocken Books, 1968, 1986, & 1987.
- Worsley, Peter (1977) [1964], The Third World, Nature of Human Society Series (3rd impression, 2nd American ed.), Chicago: University of Chicago Press; London: George Weidenfeld & Nicolson, ISBN 0-226-90751-1– introduced that term into the English language.
- Worsley, Peter (1970), Modern Sociology: Introductory Readings, Harmondsworth, UK: Penguin, ISBN 0-14-080221-5.
- Worsley, Peter; Bechhofer, Frank; Brown, Richard; Jeffreys, Margot; McIntosh, Mary; Newby, Howard, eds. (1970), Introducing Sociology, Harmondsworth, UK: PenguinSubsequent editions 1973, 1977, 1979 – sold over half a million copies.
- Worsley, Peter, ed. (1972), Problems of Modern Society: A Sociological Perspective, Harmondsworth, UK: Penguin Books, ISBN 0-14-080291-6Also published 1978.
- Worsley, Peter (1975), Inside China, London: A. Lane, ISBN 0-7139-0796-7.
- Worsley, Peter (1984), The Three Worlds: Culture and World Development, Chicago: University of Chicago Press, ISBN 0-226-90754-6. Subsequent publications by Weidenfeld & Nicolson (London), 1984 & 1988. ISBN 0-297-78346-7.
- Worsley, Peter (1997), Knowledges: Culture, Counterculture, Subculture, New York: The New Press & W.W. Norton, ISBN 1-56584-383-5. Subsequent publications 1998 & 1999. Alternative ISBN 1-56584-555-2.
- Worsley, Peter (1982), Marx and Marxism, Key Sociologists series, Chichester, UK: Ellis Horwood; London & New York: Tavistock Publications, ISBN 0-85312-348-9 Subsequent publications Routledge 1989, 1990 ISBN 0-415-04321-2; 2002 ISBN 0-415-28537-2.

== Citations ==
Academic offices
Preceded by Thomas Bottomore	President of the British Sociological Association; 1971–1975	Succeeded by Sheila Allen
