= John Frum =

Figure associated with cargo cults on the island of Tanna in Vanuatu

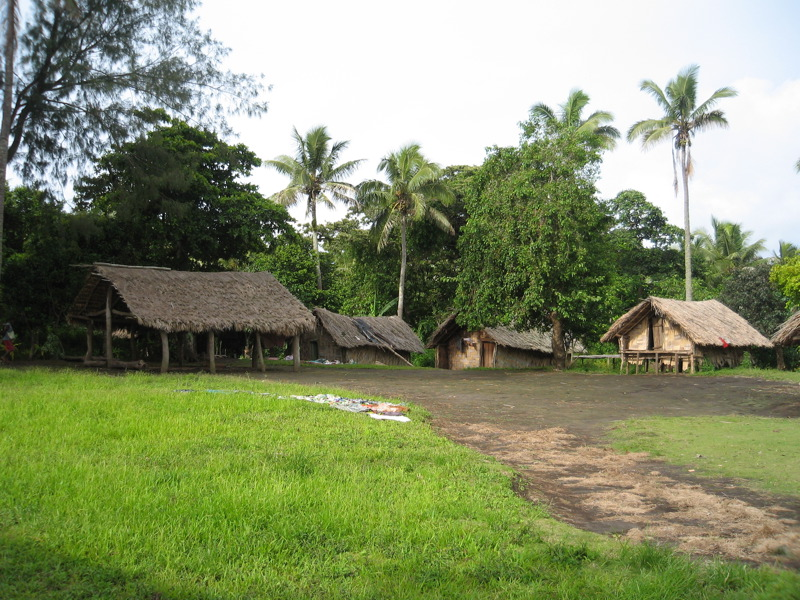
A John Frum gathering area

John Frum (also called Jon Frum, John Brum, and John Prum) is a figure associated with cargo cults on the island of Tanna in Vanuatu (formerly the New Hebrides). He is often depicted as an American World War II serviceman who will bring wealth and prosperity to the people if they follow him.

In 1959, David Attenborough asked the group's leader about John Frum and was told, "'E look like you. 'E got white face. 'E tall man....'E come from South America and bring plenty cargo. An' every man 'e get every thing 'e want."

In the 1990s, there were reportedly over 5,000 members of the John Frum movement. However, belief in John Frum is in decline; as of 2022, there are fewer than 500 practitioners. Currently, only the village of Lamakara is faithful to the John Frum faith on the island of Tanna. The rest of the island has been mostly converted by Christian missionaries based in Sulphur Bay.

== History ==
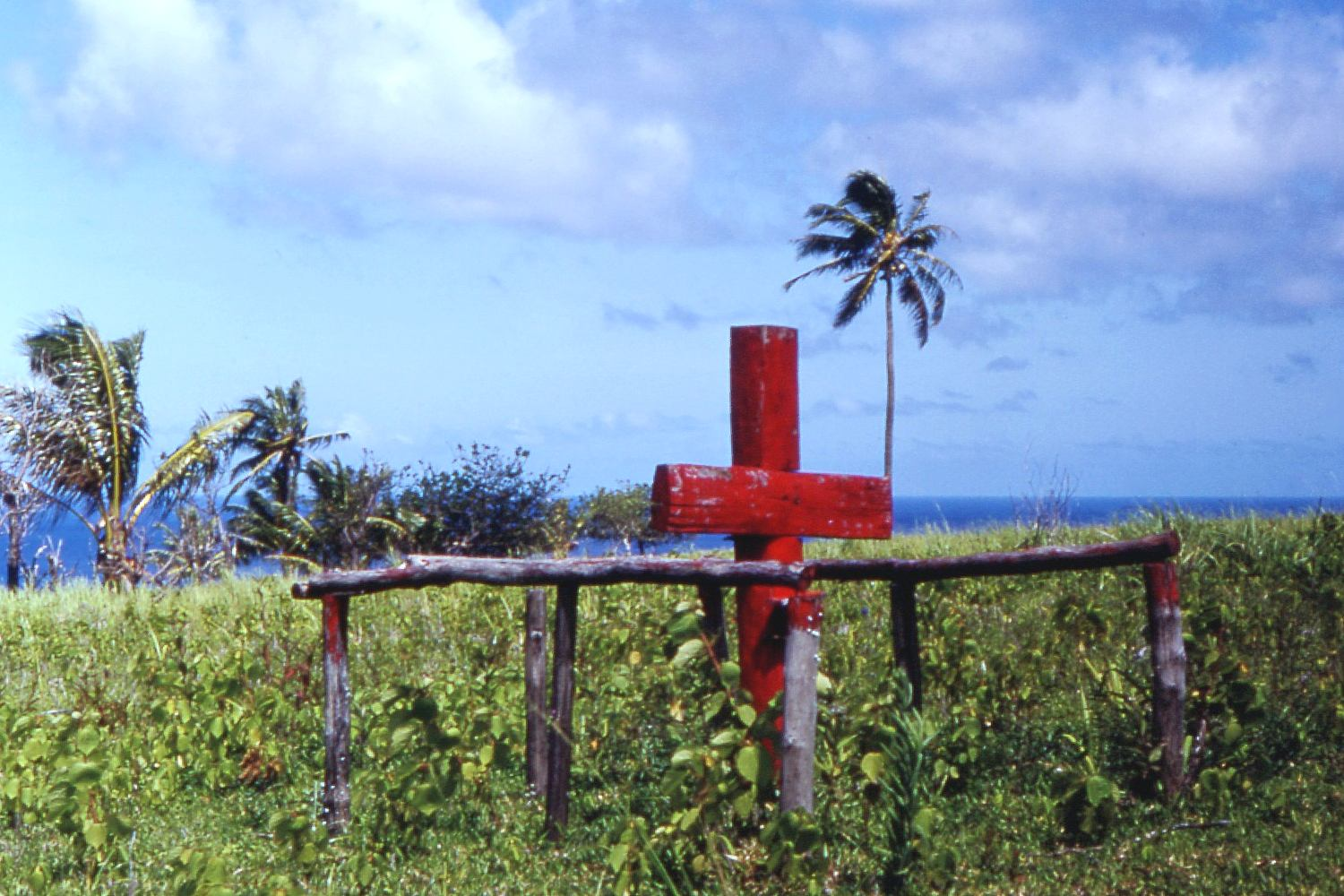
A ceremonial cross of the John Frum cargo cult, Tanna, New Hebrides (now Vanuatu), 1967

The religion centering on John Frum arose no later than the late 1930s, when Vanuatu was known as the New Hebrides. The religion may have originated as early as the 1910s, according to a claim in 1949. The movement was influenced by existing religious practice in the Sulphur Bay area of Tanna, particularly the worship of Keraperamun, a god associated with Mount Tukosmera.

In one analysis of the cult, the figure was first known as John Broom, who was believed by followers to one day return from a distant land to sweep away the White colonials and return riches to the islands. In some versions of the story, a native man named Manehivi, using the alias "John Frum", began appearing among the native people of Tanna dressed in a Western-style coat, assuring the people he would bring them houses, clothes, food, and transport.

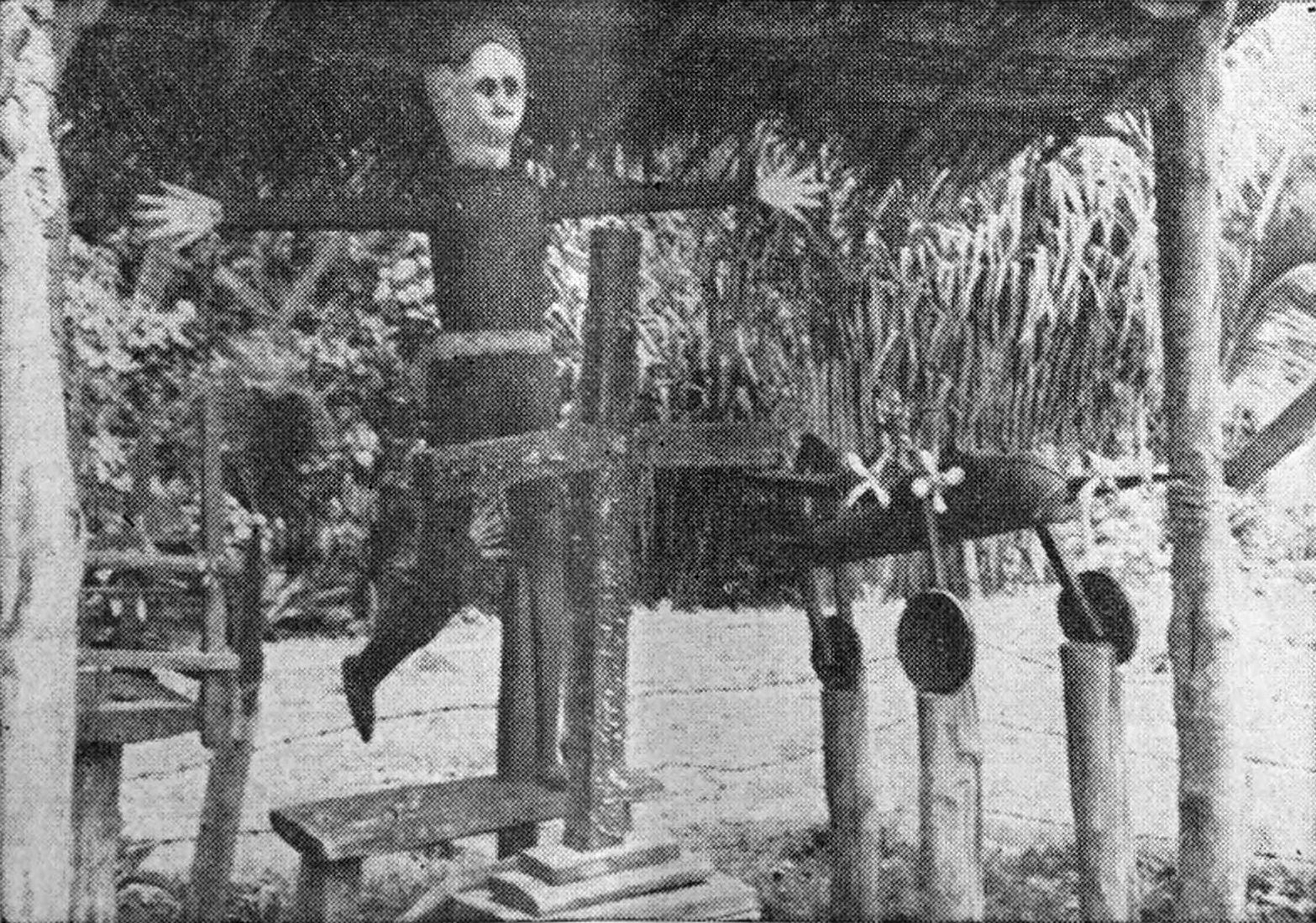
Attenborough's photograph of an effigy of John Frum alongside a model aircraft, 1960.

Others contend that John Frum was a spirit vision induced by kava, a plant with mild psychoactive properties. Said to be a manifestation of Keraperamun, this John Frum promised the dawn of a new age in which all White people, including missionaries, would depart the New Hebrides, leaving behind their goods and property for the native Melanesians. For this to happen, however, the people of Tanna had to reject all aspects of European society including money, Western education, Christianity and work on copra plantations, and they had to return to traditional kastom (the Bislama language word for customs).

In 1941, followers of John Frum rid themselves of their money in a frenzy of spending, left the missionary churches, schools, villages and plantations, and moved inland to participate in traditional feasts, dances and rituals. Most followers had come from the Presbyterian church. European colonial authorities sought to suppress the movement, at one point arresting a Tannese man calling himself John Frum, humiliating him publicly, imprisoning and ultimately exiling him along with other leaders of the cult to another island in the archipelago.

Despite this effort, the movement gained popularity in the early 1940s after 50,000 American troops were stationed in Vanuatu during World War II, bringing with them an enormous amount of supplies (or "cargo"). During the war, approximately 10,000 Ni-Vanuatu men served in the Vanuatu Labor Corps, a labor battalion of the United States Armed Forces. They provided logistical support to the Allied war effort during the Guadalcanal campaign. The mass participation of Ni-Vanuatu men in the Labor Corps had a significant effect on the John Frum movement, giving it the characteristics of a cargo cult.

After the war and the departure of the Americans, followers of John Frum built symbolic landing strips to encourage American airplanes to land and bring them "cargo". Versions of the cult emphasizing the American connection interpret "John Frum" as a corruption of "John from (America)" (although it could mean "John from" anywhere outside Vanuatu).

In 1957, leaders of the John Frum movement created the "Tanna Army", a non-violent faux army that organized military-style parades with men wearing imitation American caps, long trousers, singlets across their chests with the letters "T-A USA" (Tanna Army USA), and carried imitation bamboo guns with carved bayonets. The group proceeded to march around the island but were stopped before marching through the Presbyterian Mission. The Government decided to address the situation; which resulted in part of the Tanna Army barricading themselves inside their headquarters with real guns, not fake ones. Eventually the leaders of the Tanna Army were arrested, tried, and jailed in Vila.

A Tanna Army parade takes place every year on February 15, the date on which followers believe John Frum will return, and which is observed as "John Frum Day" in Vanuatu.

In 1959, when David Attenborough asked one of the followers why he was still waiting for the cargo after it had been 19 years since it was promised and had not arrived, the man said "If you can wait two thousand years for Jesus Christ to come 'an 'e no come, then I can wait more than nineteen years for John."

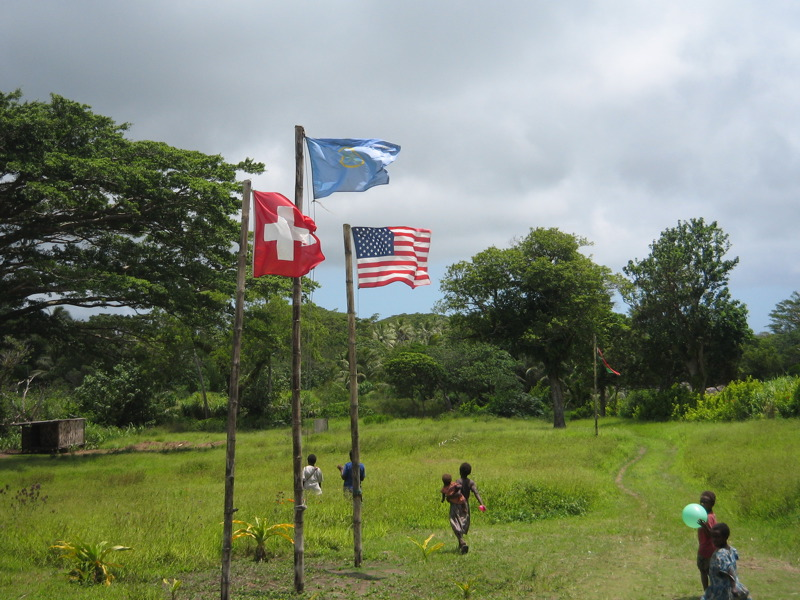
A John Frum cargo cult ceremonial flag-raising

In the late 1970s, John Frum followers opposed the imminent creation of an independent united nation of Vanuatu. They objected to a centralised government they feared would favor Western modernity and Christianity that would be detrimental to local customs. The John Frum movement has its own political party, Nagriamel, led by Song Keaspai. The party celebrated its 50th anniversary on February 15, 2007. Chief Isaak Wan Nikiau, its leader, was quoted by the BBC from years past as saying that John Frum was "our God, our Jesus" and would eventually return.

In December 2011, the president of the John Frum movement (and jointly of Nagriamel) was Thitam Goiset, a woman of Vietnamese origin and sister of businessman Dinh Van Than, despite the leadership of these movements having been "previously [...] held by high ranking male chiefs". In 2013, Thitam Goiset was removed from her role as Vanuatu's ambassador to Russia amid evidence of corrupt activities.

Followers of the movement continue to celebrate John Frum Day each year in February. Europeans who have made claims of being the leader mentioned in the prophecy—such as Claude-Philippe Berger (d. July 2021), who styled himself the "traditional king of Tanna"—have gained status in Vanuatuan communities by promising to bring development and investment to the communities.

== See also ==
- Melanesian mythology
- Prince Philip movement
- Turaga nation

== Bibliography ==
- Lindstrom, Lamont (1991). "Remembering the Pacific War". Occasional Papers of the Center for Pacific Islands Studies. Center for Pacific Studies: 47–59. ISSN 0897-8905.
- Joël Bonnemaison, « Tanna : les hommes lieux (livre 2) » dans Les fondements d'une identité : territoire, histoire et société dans l'archipel de Vanuatu (Mélanésie) : essai de géographie culturelle, ORSTOM Paris, 1988, [lire en ligne [archive]]
- Tabani, Marc. 2008. Une pirogue pour le Paradis : le culte de John Frum à Tanna (Vanuatu) [archive], Paris : Éditions de la Maison des Sciences de l'Homme, 2008.
- Tabani, Marc. 2010. Le culte de John Frum et la tragédie du nouveau millénaire à Tanna (Vanuatu) [archive]. In Douaire-Marsaudon F. et Weichart G. (eds.), Pacific Religiosities. Marseille : Pacific-Credo Publications, 145–172.
- Tabani Marc, Marcellin Abong. 2013. Kago, Kastom, Kalja: the study of indigenous movements in Melanesia today [archive], Marseille, Pacific Credo Publications.

== Filmography ==
- God Is American, feature documentary (2007, 52 min), by Richard Martin-Jordan, on Frum's cult at Tanna
- The Fantastic Invasion, documentary (1991, 59min) by Nigel Randell Evans for the BBC
- Into the Inferno, feature documentary (2016, 107 min), by Werner Herzog, on Tanna's active volcano
