= James Lyall (minister) =

Presbyterian minister (1827-1905)

James Lyall (9 April 1827 – 10 September 1905) was a Presbyterian minister in the early days of Adelaide, South Australia.

== History ==
Lyall was born in Edinburgh the son of James Lyall and his wife Janet Lyall, née Pirrie, and was educated at Edinburgh High School, Glasgow University and Edinburgh University, and for the ministry at the Theological Hall of the United Presbyterian Church. He served as a home missionary in Glasgow, Edinburgh and Alloa for 10 years before being called to Adelaide as a replacement for Rev. Ralph Drummond at the United Presbyterian Church on Gouger Street.

They sailed to Melbourne aboard Ellen Stuart, arriving on 7 September, and during their enforced stopover he took a couple of services, and arrived in Adelaide aboard Burra Burra by 25 September 1857 and took his first service there on 27 September 1857. The church enjoyed a steady increase in membership numbers.

He applied himself to his new community, as a founder of the multi-faith City Mission, and Bush Mission Society, and was prominent at official functions of other Protestant denominations. He was active in the Temperance cause, the South Australian Sunday School Teachers' Union, London Missionary Society, British and Foreign Bible Society, Missions for the Heathen, Aborigines' Friends' Association and others. He brought to his congregation influential, wealthy and generous members: W. W. Hughes, John Duncan, David Murray and John Gordon. Mrs. Lyall was also active in temperance and other causes, amongst them the Women's Christian Temperance Union and the Presbyterian Women's Missionary Union in South Australia, of which she was founding president.

In 1873 and 1874 he took a long holiday in Great Britain and the Continent, most of their expenses being met by the congregation.

In January 1863 a site was purchased for £700 for a new church on Flinders Street directly opposite the Baptist church which was completed a few years earlier. The foundation stone of Flinders Street Church was laid by Rev. Ralph Drummond on 5 September 1864. The building was completed a year later and the first service was held there by Rev. William Richey on 27 October 1865. A spire was erected the following year, and a manse was built next door in the same year.

He was moderator of the Federal Assembly of the Presbyterian Churches of Australia, and in that capacity visited the New Hebrides Mission, where his brother-in-law Dr. John Gibson Paton was a missionary, and attended the annual mission meeting at Aneityum.

He retired in November 1897, and was presented with a retirement gift of £2,000.

His wife died in 1902, and he moved to Mentone, Victoria, where he died a few years later following a successful surgical operation.

== Family ==
James Lyall (9 April 1827 – 10 September 1905) married Helen Whitecross (c. 1832 – 22 October 1902) of Kew, Victoria in England on 29 April 1857. Their family included:

- Helen Lyall (8 March 1859 – 9 August 1907) married William Hanna Hoggarth (18 October 1850 – 12 August 1919) in 1882
- James Lyall (4 July 1860 – 2 April 1940) married Ellen "Lillie" Morrey ( – 1912)
- John Whitecross Lyall (11 May 1862 – c. 25 May 1922) married Christina Cattanach Macintosh ( – 2 September 1897) in 1881, and to McIntosh, of Kincraig, Narracoorte. He was manager of the Commercial Bank of Adelaide at Yankalilla at the time of its collapse, in 1886 he was tried for embezzling £1245 after being apparently burgled, found "not guilty". He married again, to a daughter of William McLeod, a squatter of New South Wales.
- William Paton Lyall (13 January 1868 – 17 July 1906) married Christina "Teenie" McKenzie (c. 1875 – c. 10 September 1931) on 12 April 1897, moved to Western Australia. He was for a time of editor of the Seymour Telegraph, died on the Busselton beach from unknown causes. She married again, to George Sydney Olivey on 18 December 1909, drowned herself in the Swan River.
- Mary Edith Lyall (24 October 1872 – ) married Rev Hugh McLeod Burns (c. 1864 – 10 April 1939) on 6 June 1894
- David Murray Lyall B.A. (20 January 1876 – 29 August 1921) engaged to Evelyn Damson of Mentone, Victoria in 1906
- Elizabeth Robertson? Mary? Lyall (18 August 1877 – 8 January 1937) married Rev. Herbert Sutherland Legge (1876 – 25 June 1938) on 6 April 1911

Mrs Lyall's sister Margaret "Maggie" Whitecross (c. 1840 – 16 May 1905) married missionary Dr. John Gibson Paton (24 May 1824 – 28 January 1907)

- Rev. Francis Hume Lyall "Frank" Paton (26 August 1870 – 28 September 1938) married Clara Sophia Heyer (1875–1966) on 26 February 1896 Co-author with A. K. Langridge of John G. Paton, an Autobiography

- Professor Sir George Whitecross Paton (16 August 1902 – 16 June 1985), Vice Chancellor of Melbourne University

Rev. James Paton (1843–1907), who wrote The Story of Dr. John G. Paton's Thirty Years with South Seas Cannibals (revised by A. K. Langridge), was a brother.
