= J. Graham Miller =

New Zealand pastor and missionary

John Graham Miller (8 October 1913 – 6 September 2008) was a New Zealand-Australian pastor and missionary.

== Biography ==
Miller was born in Rangiora, New Zealand and studied at the University of Otago and Knox College, Otago. He was the son of Rev Thomas Miller and later wrote his father’s biography.

He served as a missionary in the New Hebrides (now Vanuatu), working on the island of Tangoa, where he was principal of the Tangoa Training Institute from 1947 to 1952. Miller was elected the inaugural Moderator of the General Assembly of the Presbyterian Church in Vanuatu in 1948. He later pastored churches in New Zealand and Australia, and served as Principal of the Melbourne Bible Institute.

In 1971 he returned to Tangoa to help establish the Presbyterian Bible College.

In 1980, a Festschrift was published in his honour: Evangelism and the Reformed faith: and other essays commemorating the ministry of J. Graham Miller.

Copies of his papers are held at the Pacific Manuscripts Bureau at the Australian National University, Canberra.

== Family ==
Miller was married to Flora; she died in 2006.

== Publications ==
- The Rev. Thomas Miller, M.A. : a family tribute, J. Graham Miller, 1949.
- Jonah - A Sign, J. Graham Miller, Gospel Literature Service, Bombay, 1961.
- Colossians: study notes with diagrams and questions on St. Paul's epistle to the Colossians, J. Graham Miller, 1963.
- A Workbook on Christian Doctrine, J. Graham Miller, Lawson, NSW, Australia 1974.
- A History of Church Planting in the New Hebrides, J. Graham Miller, Book 1 1978, Book 2 1981, Book 3 1985, Book 4 1986, Book 5 1987, Book 6 1989, Book 7 1990, Sydney, Australia.
- The Treasury of His Promises, J. Graham Miller, The Banner of Truth Trust, Edinburgh 1986, reprinted 2001.
- Calvin’s Wisdom: An Anthology, J. Graham Miller, The Banner of Truth Trust, Edinburgh 1992.
- An A-Z of Christian Truth and Experience, J. Graham Miller, The Banner of Truth Trust, Edinburgh 2003.
- A Day’s March Nearer Home: Autobiography of J. Graham Miller, edited by Iain H. Murray, The Banner of Truth Trust 2010. ISBN 978-1-84871-064-1
