= Tangoa =

Tangoa may refer to:

- Tangoa (island), an island of Vanuatu;
- Tangoa language, the Oceanic language spoken on this island.
