= Presbyterian Church of Vanuatu =

Christian denomination in Vanuatu

Presbyterian Church of Vanuatu Église presbytérienne de Vanuatu (French)
- Classification: Protestant
- Orientation: Calvinist
- Theology: Reformed Evangelical
- Polity: Presbyterian
- Associations: World Communion of Reformed Churches, World Council of Churches
- Region: Vanuatu
- Origin: 1948
- Congregations: 400 and 450 house fellowships
- Members: 78,000 baptised and 65,000 active members
- Ministers: 200
- Other name: Presbyterian Church of the New Hebrides (1948–1980)

The Presbyterian Church of Vanuatu (French: Église presbytérienne de Vanuatu), or the Presbitirin Jyos Blong Vanuatu in Bislama, is the largest Christian denomination in Vanuatu.

== History ==
It was created by missionaries of the London Missionary Society in the mid-1800s. In 1838 Rev John William arrived on the Island of Futuna. In Eromango Rev. William was martyred and eaten. In 1841 Apela and Samuele were placed to Futuna. Both of them were martyred. They prepared the way for Presbyterians from Canada, Scotland, Australia, and New Zealand. The Presbyterian Mission Synod contributed to the mission in the New Hebrides. Prominent missionaries were John Gibson Paton and Margaret Paton from Scotland and John Geddie from Nova Scotia. Even today the Scottish Presbyterian tradition is visible in the life of the Vanuatuan church. The church developed rapidly from the south to the north. It employed indigenous pastors and teachers. In 1905 Margaret Paton died and her memorial church was built at Vila.

The church become autonomous in 1948 as the Presbyterian Church of the New Hebrides. Vanuatu became free from British and French colonization in 1980. Most of the members of the new government were Presbyterians, because the Presbyterian church is the only denomination that established a theological seminary and concentrated on educating the Ni-Vanuatu people.

== Statistics ==
The denomination has approximately 78,000 members and 400 congregations, as well as 450 house fellowships in 6 presbyteries as of 1 January 2006. It is the largest denomination in the country, representing more than 30% of the population of Vanuatu.

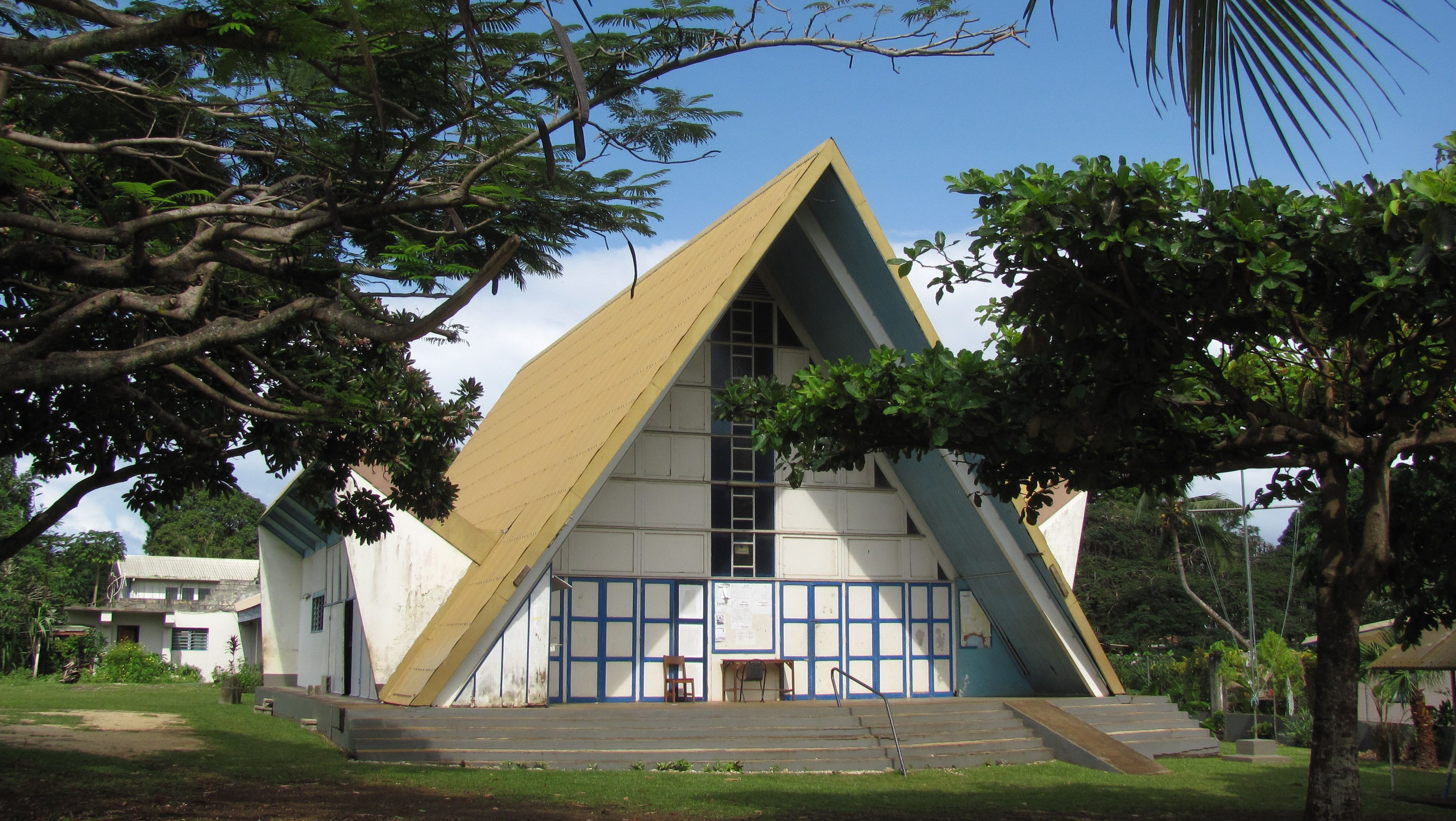
Paton Memorial Church in Port Vila.

The PCV (Presbyterian Church of Vanuatu) is headed by a moderator with offices in Port Vila. The PCV is particularly strong in the provinces of Tafea, Shefa, and Malampa. The Province of Sanma is mainly Presbyterian with a strong Roman Catholic minority in the Francophone areas of the province. There are some Presbyterian people, but no organised Presbyterian churches in Penama and Torba, both of which are traditionally Anglican. Vanuatu is the only country in the South Pacific with a significant Presbyterian heritage and membership.

The church runs schools. PCV ministers are trained in the Presbyterian's official theological institute, the Talua Theological Training Institute on South Santo. It offers diploma of theology, diploma of mission and Bachelor of Ministries Programs. Graduates from the college become church leaders in various denominations and evangelists to isolated islands.

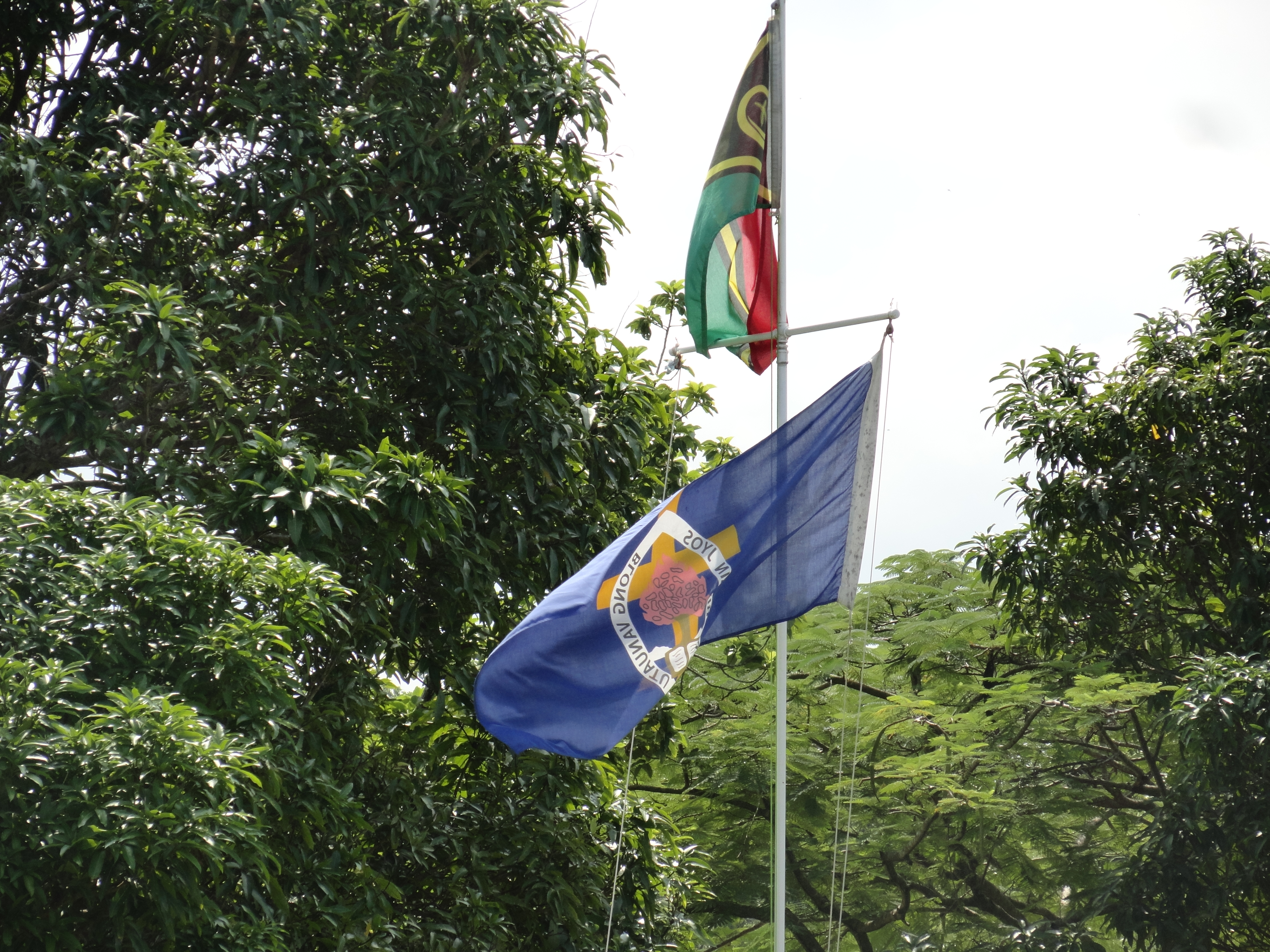
Flagpole at the Talua Theological Training Institute with the flags of Vanuatu (top) and the Presbyterian Church of Vanuatu.

== Doctrine ==
The Presbyterian Church in Vanuatu affirms the Apostles Creed and Westminster Confession of Faith.

== Interchurch relations ==
The Presbyterian Church of Vanuatu is a member of the World Communion of Reformed Churches.

The Presbyterian Church in Vanuatu has partner relations with the Presbyterian Church of Australia. The Australian church supports the Talua Theological Training Institute, which provides the ministry training of the Presbyterian Church in Vanuatu.
