= Frank H. L. Paton =

Presbyterian missionary (1870–1938)

Francis Hume Lyall (Note: It is likely he was (in part) named for his father's friend and brother-in-law, James Lyall of Adelaide.) Paton (26 August 1870 – 28 September 1938), commonly referred to as Frank, was a Presbyterian missionary and minister in Victoria, Australia.

== Early life and education ==
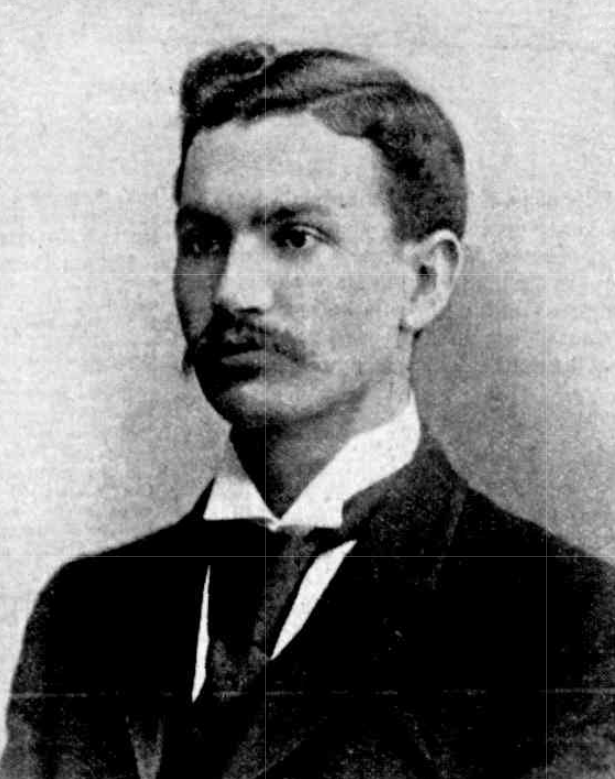
Frank H. L. Paton

Paton was born in Aniwa, New Hebrides, to Rev. Dr. John Gibson Paton (24 May 1824 – 28 January 1907), one of the first missionaries to the New Hebrides (now Vanuatu), and his second wife Margaret "Maggie" Paton, née Whitecross, (1841–1905), whom he married in 1864.

Paton attended Scotch College, Melbourne (1881-1887) and received his theological education at Ormond College, Melbourne and the University of Glasgow. He graduated from the University of Melbourne (M.A., 1892) and from St Andrews (B.D., 1896).

== Missionary service ==
Paton was ordained in Melbourne in November 1895, and worked as a missionary in West Tanna, New Hebrides, from 1896 to 1902, when he was forced to leave through ill health.

== Army and later career ==
Paton enlisted into the Australian army and served during World War I as a chaplain (Captain) from 1918 to 1919.

He was appointed the Presbyterian Church's foreign mission agent before taking charge of the Dunolly church 1904–1907 and serving as the Presbyterian church of Victoria's foreign mission secretary, 1908–1925.

In 1922 he was elected moderator (synod president) of the Presbyterian Church in Victoria.

He was a delegate to the Council of Churches in Victoria and succeeded A. E. Illingworth as president in 1924, but was unable through illness to see out his full year, and from March 1925 his duties were performed by the vice-president, W. S. Pearse. Nevertheless, in June 1925 he was able to take charge of the Deepdene Presbyterian church.

He retired around 1936 and died at his Deepdene home after a long illness, and his remains were buried at the Burwood cemetery.

== Recognition ==
The Presbyterian church in Deepdene was renamed in his honor, and a window dedicated to his memory installed in 1946.

== Family ==
Paton married Clara Sophia Heyer (3 September 1875 – 18 Jul 1966) on 19 February 1896. Their family included:

- Francis Heyer Paton (1898-1900)
- Professor Sir George Whitecross Paton (1902–1985)
- Rev. James Kennedy “Ken” Paton, (1904-1974) Presbyterian minister at Woodford, Victoria
- Clara Margaret "Peggy" Paton (1908-2002) married Rev Hedley P. Bunton, served as missioner in China
- Elizabeth Heyer "Betty" Paton, (1911-1971) missioner in Hong Kong, married Dr Frank Ashton
- Frances Amy Paton, (1918-1998) married Rev Dr Robin Boyd

They had a home at 44 Deepdene Road, Deepdene, Victoria.
