= John Geddie (missionary) =

Scots-Canadian missionary

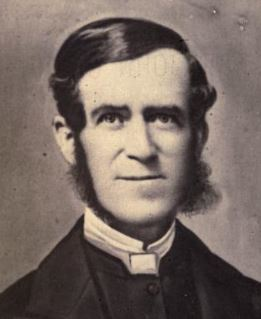
- Born: 10 April 1815; Banff, Scotland
- Died: 14 December 1872 (aged 57); Geelong, Australia
- Occupation: Presbyterian Missionary
- Years active: 1846–1872
- Spouse: Charlotte McDonald
- Children: four daughters survived to adulthood (including Charlotte Anne Geddie 1840–1906) and one son

John Geddie (10 April 1815 – 14 December 1872) was a Scots-Canadian missionary who was known as "the father of Presbyterian missions in the South Seas." He pioneered missionary work in the New Hebrides islands, now known as Vanuatu. He became Doctor of Divinity in 1866. On December 14, 1872, he died in Geelong, Australia.

== Early life ==
John Geddie (1815–1872) was born in Banff, Scotland, April 10, 1815. His father, a watch and clock maker, was a devout member of the Presbyterian Church. In 1816, his family emigrated and settled in Pictou, Nova Scotia, Canada. After completing education at grammar school and later the Pictou Academy, he entered upon the study of theology. When his health failed he faced the prospect of having to give up the ministry, but he vowed to commit himself to missionary work if his health recovered. On March 13, 1838, he was ordained as pastor of a congregation at Cavendish, Prince Edward Island, and in 1846 he was sent as a missionary to New Hebrides (now Vanuatu), where he served for over twenty years. He married Charlotte McDonald (spellings vary) in 1839; they had five children who survived to adulthood – four daughters and a son (see section "Family").

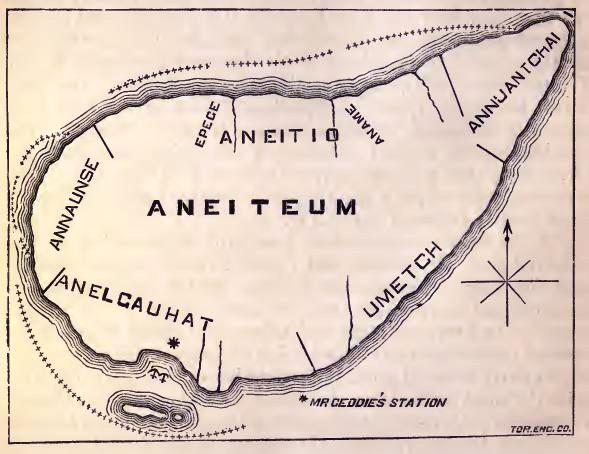
Map of Aneiteum, now named Aneityum

== Missionary work ==
=== Beginnings ===
Geddie studied the work of the London Missionary Society (LMS) and he was ambitious to become a foreign missionary. He promoted the idea within the Church, and the Presbyterian Board of Foreign Missions eventually agreed to support such a venture. However, some of the elders felt that Geddie was not a suitable candidate; they were concerned about his lack of physique and also his lack of experience. He managed to convince them that he was capable and his appointment was eventually agreed together with that of an assistant – Isaac A. Archibald – a layman who was a teacher.

After much discussion, consultation and prayer the location of the first mission was selected to be in the New Hebrides in the South Sea. The two missionaries with their wives and children sailed from Halifax on 30 November 1846 to Boston, where they changed ships. On October 17, 1847, after a journey of more than 20,000 miles, they sailed into the harbor of Pango-pango (Pago Pago) Samoa. They were met by members of the LMS who knew nothing of their coming, but extended their hospitality. It was agreed that two of the LMS missionaries would accompany Geddie and Archibald to the New Hebrides and help them establish a mission. Whilst on Samoa awaiting transport, Geddie stayed with one of those who had volunteered – Thomas Bullen – who was a missionary with seven years experience in Samoa. He acted as mentor and provided guidance on the customs of the indigenous people, their language and the treatment of illnesses and diseases that they may encounter. In March 1848 Bullen became ill and died at the age of 32. Another missionary, Thomas Powell, was selected to replace Bullen and on May 27, 1848, the LMS barque, John Williams arrived in Samoa to take the group to the New Hebrides. The final party included Geddie, Archibald, Powell, their families, Samoan servants and another LMS missionary named James Nisbet. Geddie and his wife left behind their eldest daughter, Charlotte, so that she could be sent to England for her education. On July 29, 1848, the John Williams reached the island of Aneiteum (Aneityum), in the New Hebrides group. The island was small and because of this it was agreed that James Nisbet could return to Samoa when the John Williams sailed. The party unloaded their belongings and equipment and were housed in the dwellings of the Samoan teachers Pita and Simeona who had been resident on the island since 1846. The John Williams left the island on August 6, 1848.

The existing French Catholic mission on the island was disbanded shortly after Geddie and his colleagues arrived due to sickness amongst the priests.

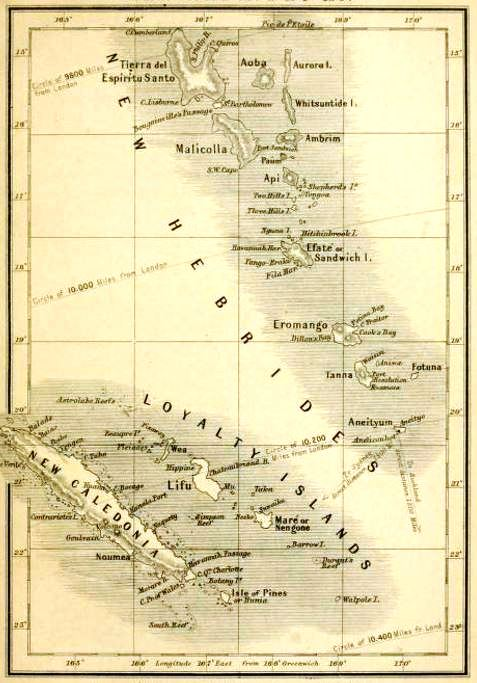
Early map of New Hebrides in South Sea

=== Learning about the inhabitants ===
Geddie and Powell were soon engrossed in learning the Aneiteumese tongue so that they could hold regular church services. Some years later Geddie discovered that their early attempts at preaching in the Aneityum language had not been understood by the congregation, but they had been too polite to point this out. Geddie had brought a printing press from Canada and this was initially used to print hymns written by Powell and later for literature used in the schools on the island.

The indigenous people on the South Sea Islands had become suspicious of outsiders due to the violence of ruthless traders and to the practice of blackbirding. This was where native peoples were either tricked into leaving the islands or were kidnapped and put into slavery on plantations. Outsiders also brought diseases to the islands that could decimate populations due to their lack of natural resistance. Outsiders, like missionaries, had little understanding of the islanders’ culture and dangerous misunderstandings could occur over what seemed to be innocuous incidents. Geddie and Powell found this out very soon after they arrived. They had made some progress in building up their congregation, but suddenly this stopped. Some of the pigs that the missionaries had brought with them were speared and eaten by the islanders. The two men also learnt that they were in danger of being burnt out and driven off the island. Eventually they were informed that their "crime" had been threefold: first they had cropped coconuts during a period when this was prohibited; they had also removed coral from the sea to burn for lime and their worst offence was attempting to build a chapel on a sacred path. They apologised to the elders for the offence that they had given, their conciliatory approach was welcomed and this helped to improve relationships between the two communities.

When Geddie first reached Aneiteum, there were two Samoan teachers, Simeona and Pita, on the island but they had not been able to make a single convert. Geddie worked to convert the islanders in the hope of eliminating some of their practises such as cannibalism, infanticide and the sacrifice of the wives after the death of their husbands.

== Loss of Powell and Archibald ==
Isaac Archibald had been sent to another area on the island to work whilst Geddie and Powell remained together. During this period Archibald "had fallen into sin with a native woman". Archibald agreed with Geddie to write to the Board in Canada and resign, but not to tell them of his relationship with the woman. Geddie also agreed to write to the Board but again, not disclose the matter. His letter indicated that Archibald would stay on and help with the missionary work, and at some later period move to Australia. At this same time, Thomas Powell let it be known that he wanted to leave the island and return to Samoa. He had been ill and he appeared to have lost his will to continue the work on the island. This left Geddie isolated, and worse was to come. Archibald started working for a boat builder and one day he was seen removing his property from Geddie's house without discussing the matter. This coincided with an attempted arson attack on the property; Geddie concluded that Archibald was removing his items because he knew about the impending attack, but gave no warning to Geddie or his family. Geddie confronted the boat builder and was told that the islanders who carried out the attack had been incited to do so by traders who resented him interfering in their business. The boat builder, a man named William Underwood, worked for the proprietor of the island's sandalwood trade, Captain James Paddon. He had initially been of great help to the missionaries when they first arrived, placing boats at their disposal plus providing timber for their homes and for the chapel. However, as time went on Geddie started to preach against the traders and in particular their "licentious" association with the native women. In 1851 an arson attack on the mission buildings led to a confrontation between Geddie, Paddon and their supporters. Paddon, armed and in a rage, made accusations against Geddie and his wife. The confrontation lasted for about an hour and consisted mainly of verbal abuse before Paddon eventually withdrew. Geddie learnt afterwards that his supports would have stepped in if Paddon had raised his gun.

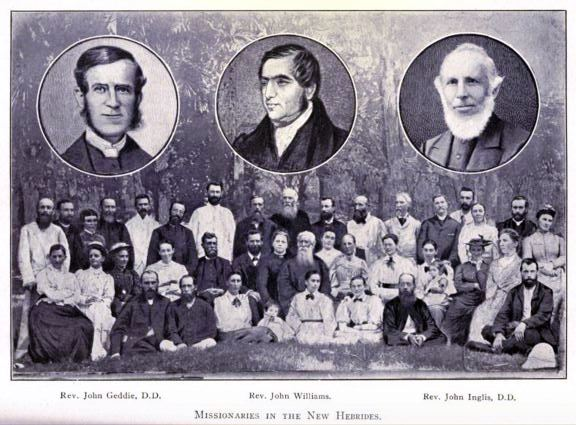
Missionaries active in the New Hebrides; right hand inset is John Inglis

Unbeknown to Geddie, Isaac Archibald had sent a second letter to the Canadian Presbyterian Board of Foreign Missions withdrawing his resignation. Because of this the Board did not arrange for his replacement. A misunderstanding developed between Geddie and the Board in Canada, exacerbated by the time delay in getting correspondence between the two parties. It was resolved with the arrival of the Rev. John Inglis (missionary) and his wife on July 1, 1852. Inglis was a member of the Reformed Presbyterian Church of Scotland and he took up residence as a missionary on the north side of the island. In his first year Inglis opened eight new schools and had 550 scholars over the age of six.

== Arrival of additional missionaries ==
Later other missionaries arrived, the first in 1857 being Canadian, Rev. George Nicol Gordon, and his British wife, Ellen Catherine Powell. They were destined for the adjacent island of Tanna, but due to unrest there went to Erromango. Four years later they were murdered on the island. Gordon's brother James took over the mission but in 1872 he was also murdered. Next missionary to arrive at Aneityum on July 8, 1858, was Canadian Rev. J. W. Matheson and his wife Mary, who was a niece of Rev. Geddie. Other missionaries that followed included Rev. John G. Paton, the Rev Joseph Copeland (both of the Reformed Presbyterian Church of Scotland) plus Rev. Samuel Fulton Johnston, from Canada. Matheson, Paton and Johnston worked on the island of Tanna to the north of Aneityum but illness and disease took its toll of this group. Johnson died in January 1861; March of the following year Mary Matheson died and in June the Rev. Matheson died. Paton had also been very ill but recovered, however his wife and child died from the sickness.

== Deadly epidemic ==
This terrible loss was not in isolation, in late 1860 a measles epidemic began on Aneityum and it killed over one thousand of the indigenous islanders – almost a third of the population. The epidemic was almost certainly brought in by traders and spread to Tanna and Erromango with similar devastating loss of life. However, the missionaries inadvertently spread the measles epidemic to the small island of Aniwa on their boat John Knox, when they returned an islander who had been infected. Several of Geddie's teachers and two of his church elders died in the epidemic including Simeona, the Samoan who had greeted him on his first day on the island and who had become an elder. Charlotte Geddie, who helped teach the children and women on the island, mourned the loss of many including one girl she called Mary, whom she had come to regard as a daughter. Other epidemics occurred in later years, reducing the population even further and by 1910 it was estimated that less than 400 islanders survived on Aneityum

== Death of widows ==
The missionaries were horrified to learn of the custom on the island of killing newly widowed women in the belief that they would join their husbands in the after life. In the early days, both Powell and Geddie tried and failed to save women from this fate. When Geddie eventually did save the life of a widow she responded by threatening to take her own life. Geddie wrote that by 1854 the killing of widows on the island had been abolished.

== Converting the islanders ==
As Geddie entered his third year on Aneityum he wrote a long letter to the Board in Canada outlining progress. At this time he had not converted any of the islanders but did measure progress as follows: "For many months after our arrival almost every day brought some new act of theft to light, and altogether we lost property to a considerable amount; but now locks and keys are entirely useless. The natives who attended our Sabbath meetings used to come with their clubs and spears and painted visages; but now we seldom see a weapon on the Sabbath day, and the habit of painting is falling into disuse. I have seen the day when a man who wore a garment was the sport of others, but now every rag in the community is in requisition on the Sabbath day. All this were nothing, however, except as evidence of a change of heart wrought by the Spirit of God."

Geddie established his first mission on the south side of Aneityum in an area under the control of a chief named Nohoat. At first the chief and his followers displayed an ambivalent attitude towards the missionaries, and Geddie considered that Nohoat was an "enemy to our work". But as time when on Nohoat became a friend of the Geddies and he was eventually admitted to the church. Geddie was at first afraid to leave the safety of this district because of threats to his life in other areas, but gradually he was able to spread his message across the island. Teachers were trained and worked in upwards of 60 religious schools; the pupils were taught to read in order that they could study the Bible, transposed by the missionaries into Aneityumese. Geddie organised his congregations using elected deacons and ordained ruling elders; these were each assigned a number of church members with whom they held meetings for "conversation, exhortation and prayer". There were still set-backs and dangers but by the mid 1850s Geddie estimated that more than half of the population were Christian.

One of the problems that the missionaries faced in the New Hebrides was that the languages spoken on each of the islands differed. So although Geddie and his companions had translated sections of the Bible for use on Aneityum this was of no use for other islands such as Tanna, Efate and Eromanga. John Inglis described the effect of this on Geddie as being to "shut him up in a single reef".

== Dr. Geddie's Church ==
Geddie supervised the erection of a large stone built church at Anelcauhat, opened in 1860. It had been constructed by the islanders and was 101 feet long and 41 feet wide. The building took 18 months to erect and was made of locally quarried stones, some of which were so large that it took 60 men to move them. The building was plastered both inside and out and had a veranda to provide protection. The building had windows, obtained from Sydney, and paid for by the sale of logs cut down by the locals. The congregation sat "oriental fashion" in the church, although the missionaries and their families were provided with seating. The building was destroyed in the 1910 earthquake, but the remains can still be seen and have been subject to archaeological research in recent years.

== Missionary ship Dayspring ==
The missionaries journeyed to other islands using borrowed means, or via the LMS ship John Williams when available. In response to Geddie's request for their own vessel, friends in Canada and Scotland, raised funds for a 12.5-ton vessel named John Knox; it was built for them in Scotland and delivered in 1857. Funding to help with the running of this vessel came from the mission in New Zealand. Later they had a larger vessel built in Canada called Dayspring, with funds raised by Rev. John Paton. It was of about 150 tons, delivered in 1864, and allowing them to travel over much larger distances. In this, and sometimes in other vessels, more extensive journeys were made through the New Hebrides, New Caledonia and the Loyalty Islands. Geddie settled and supported teachers on various islands in this way, after seeking assurances from the chiefs that his teachers would be protected, and only left these people if they fully agreed. Despite these precautions, many of the workers were lost to disease or violence.

== New Testament ==
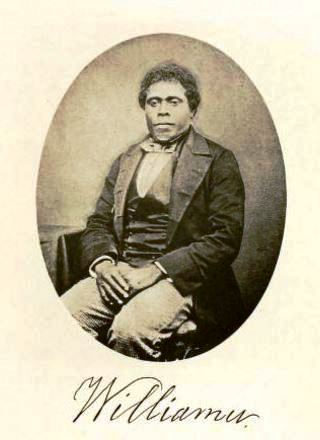
Photo of Williamu on visit to Britain

Geddie transcribed sections of the New Testament into the Aneityum language. He started on Matthew's Gospel and when Inglis arrived in the island they collaborated on translating Mark. The final version of the Mark Gospel was then printed for them in Sydney, Australia. After this they re-worked the Matthew Gospel and printed it themselves on a new press that they had acquired. They continued to work on the New Testament and eventually received approval and funding from the British and Foreign Bible Society to publish the full transcribed text. It was agreed that the printing would be carried out in London; at first Geddie and his family were to accompany the manuscript, but his new baby was too young to travel, so Inglis and his wife went on the John Williams in 1859, a journey of seven months duration. They also took an islander with them, a man called Williamu, to help with final editing. When they arrived in London, Inglis had to submit the work for approval to an editing superintendent from the Bible Society. He put forward nine hundred pages of edits before the manuscript – containing over a quarter of a million words – finally got approved and was printed. Inglis returned to the island on July 3, 1863, with the first consignment of the New Testaments, to be followed in September by the remained of the 1000 copies. In his journal Geddie says that the islanders paid £400 towards the cost of these books, the money coming from the sale of arrowroot.

Letters home from Williamu whilst he was in Britain were published in a book written by John Inglis. On August 24, 1861, Williamu acknowledges a letter from Mrs Charlotte Geddie, who wrote to tell him of the death of his wife Dora, and the death of many more of his people during the measles epidemic.

== The incident of HMS Curacoa ==
In 1865 Geddie travelled to Canada via England and Scotland. During his absence the other missionaries of the New Hebrides were holding one of their meetings on the island of Aneiteum when HMS Curacoa arrived in harbour under the command of Commodore William Wiseman. He was responding to reports of disputes on the island of Tanna that had been made by the missionary Rev. John Paton – all of which had happened some years before. The missionaries (including Paton) on board their schooner Dayspring, accompanied HMS Curacoa to Tanna, where Wiseman sent word to the chiefs of the village at Port Resolution that he wanted them to account for their action in this dispute. They however, failed to meet the Commodore's deadline. After another deadline was missed he sent word that he was going to destroy their village and at the appointed time opened fire and later sent a landing party with rockets. During the skirmish one sailor was shot dead and many islanders were probably killed or wounded. The Commodore also gave orders to destroy the islanders' canoes. Geddies had always been opposed to this type of retaliatory action and he described the incident as "one of the most humiliating events in the history of modern missions."

== Sandalwood and labour traffic ==
The root and lower trunk of the sandalwood tree is valued for its perfumed wood. These trees grew in large numbers on some of the islands in the New Hebrides and once this was discovered a period of exploitation took place. Aneityum became depleted, but other islands, such as Erromango, had large resources and in 1844 entrepreneur, Captain James Paddon, established a base on Aneityum for the collection and storage of sandalwood in preparation for shipment to China. Paddon and Geddie initially had an amicable relationship but this deteriorated and in 1852 Paddon left the island, blaming Geddie's attitude for his departure.

Another merchant called Captain Robert Towns took over the trading and he had good relationships with Geddie and the missionaries. His business interests included whaling, coca-nut oil and in 1863 he started growing cotton (later sugar) in Queensland, Australia. For this he needed a large labour force and in 1863 he sent his schooner Don Juan to the South Seas looking for workers. His instructions to the captain and crew were that islanders were to be well treated and conditions of employment explained to them. Towns told his captain that if he came across a missionary, he was to explain that the workers would be well fed, given only light work and returned to the island within 6 months. Obviously Towns had not told Geddie in advance of his intentions to recruit in the New Hebrides, probably aware of what his response would be. From these beginning in 1863, it is estimated that 60,000 South Sea Islanders were eventually recruited to work in Australia.

== Memorials ==
When, John Inglis returned from England in 1863 he noticed a change in Geddie, saying he was "broken down", a condition probably brought on by the terrible events of the measles epidemic. He left the island for three years to visit Britain and Canada, returning in better spirits, but "he had become less vigorous than formerly". In July 1871 he contracted influenza and this left him permanently debilitated, and the following year suffered paralysis. He died December 14, 1872; a tablet, prepared in Sydney, was placed behind the pulpit of the church in the village of Anelcauhat on Aneityum, where he had preached. On this was the following inscription:

"In memory of John Geddie, D.D., born in Scotland, 1815, minister in Prince Edward Island seven years, Missionary sent from Nova Scotia to Aneiteum for twenty-four years. When he landed in 1848, there were no Christians here, and when he left in 1872 there were no heathen."

A memorial was also erected in the Geelong Cemetery in 1878, designed by architect Alexander Davidson.

== Family ==
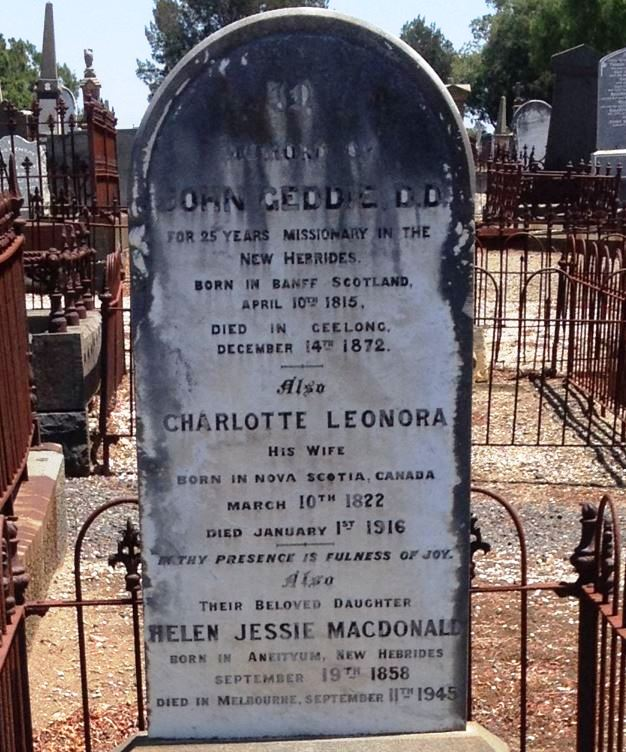
Grave of John Geddie, his wife and youngest daughter; Geelong Eastern Cemetery.

Rev. Geddie's wife, Charlotte Macdonald born 1822, was the daughter of Charlotte Leonora Harrington and Dr. Alexander Macdonald of Antigonish, Nova Scotia. After the death of her husband she lived in Melbourne where she had the company of her daughter Helen, and where she died in 1916.

Geddie's daughter and son were raised in England and Nova Scotia with only a brief period with their parents in New Hebrides. Geddie's daughter Charlotte Anne Geddie was a Presbyterian worker and editor who spent only three years (1856–1859) in New Hebrides before settling in Halifax, Nova Scotia, after marrying merchant William Harris Harrington. Two other daughters married missionaries: Elizabeth Keir Geddie (1850–1945), married Rev. Dr. Daniel Macdonald and Lucretia Geddie (1846–1909) married the Rev. Thomas Neilson.

Their youngest daughter Helen Jessie Macdonald Geddie, was born September 19, 1858, at Aneiteum, New Hebrides and died unmarried on September 11, 1945, at Elsternwick, Melbourne, Victoria, Australia Their son John Williams Geddie, was born February 2, 1852, in the New Hebrides and died c. 1934 in Sale, Victoria, Australia. Three of the Geddies' children died in their infancy: Jane Fraser Geddie was born June 11, 1842, in Canada and died there March 10, 1846. Mary Sophia Geddie was born July 21, 1844, in Canada and died there February 15, 1846. Alexander Geddie was born May 5, 1861, on Aneiteum, New Hebrides and died January 16, 1864, on a sea voyage to Australia from Aneiteum.

== Sources ==
- Eugene Myers Harrison, John Geddie: Messenger of the Love of Christ in Eastern Melanesia. Chicago, Ill.: Scripture Press Book Division, 1949. Summarised in the following website: http://www.wholesomewords.org/missions/bgeddie.html
- George Patterson, Missionary Life Among the Cannibals: Being the Life of the Rev. John Geddie, D.D., First Missionary to the New Hebrides: with a history of the Nova Scotia Presbyterian mission on that group. Toronto: J. Campbell, J. Bain, Hart, 1882.
