= James Gordon (missionary) =

Scottish-Canadian missionary (1832–1872)

James Douglas Gordon (1832 – 7 March 1872) was a Canadian missionary to the New Hebrides (now Vanuatu). Gordon was born in Alberton, Prince Edward Island, Canada. Gordon followed his older brother, George N. Gordon, to Erromango, Vanuatu after the latter was martyred in 1861.

Gordon arrived in the New Hebrides in 1864, and served as a missionary with the Presbyterian Church of the Lower Provinces and then the Presbyterian Church of New South Wales before becoming an independent missionary in 1870. He translated the Book of Genesis and the Gospel of Matthew into the Erromanga language.

Gordon was killed by a native man in 1872. He is usually regarded as a Christian martyr.

A. K. Langridge called him "a man of tremendous energy and force of character." J. Graham Miller suggests that "few missionaries have so soon won the hearts of the heathen as James Gordon." Miller notes, however, that Gordon was a loner, and that his move toward a dispensational view of biblical prophecy "increased his sense of isolation" from his missionary colleagues.
