= Aniwa Airport =

Airport in Vanuatu

- IATA: AWD; ICAO: NVVB

Summary
- Airport type: Public
- Serves: Aniwa, Taféa, Vanuatu
- Elevation AMSL: 69 ft / 21 m
- Coordinates: 19°14′04″S 169°36′02″E

Map
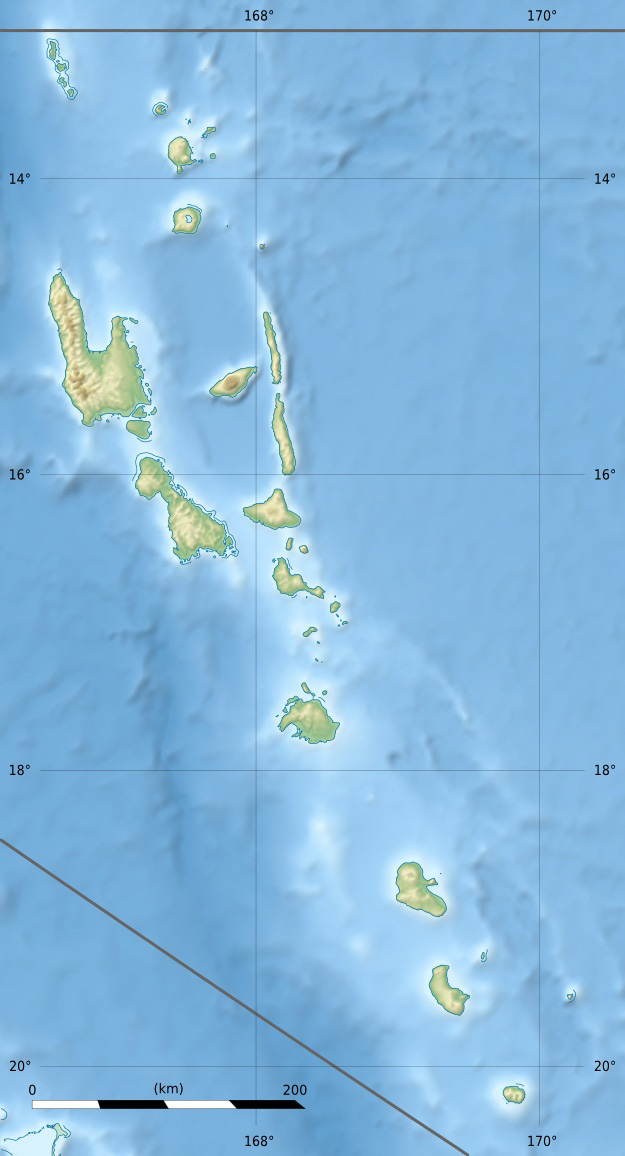
- Location of airport in Vanuatu

Runways
Direction	Length		Surface
Direction	m	ft	Surface
	940	3,084

Aniwa Airport (IATA: AWD, ICAO: NVVB) is an airfield on the island of Aniwa, in the Taféa province in Vanuatu.

== Facilities ==
The airport resides at an elevation of 69 feet (21 m) above mean sea level. It has one runway which is 940 metres (3,084 ft) in length.
