= James Paddon =

British sailor and merchant; South Pacific settler (1811–1861)

- Born: 23 September 1811; Portsea, Hampshire
- Died: 13 February 1861 (aged 49); Nou Island, New Caledonia
- Occupation: Merchant

James Paddon (23 September 1811, Portsea, Hampshire – 13 February 1861, Nou Island, New Caledonia) was an English navigator-merchant, sandalwood, settler, pioneer in the New Hebrides and New Caledonia.

== Early years ==
The beginning of his life remains unknown. Originally from Portsea, the island where Portsmouth is located in Hampshire, in the south of England. The fifth of ten children, his father was a pilot. It seems that Paddon left the Royal Navy with the rank of midshipman in Australia.

He was then found in 1840 in China, where he was the Captain of the brig Brigand on behalf of a Parsi Heerjeebhoy Rustomjee, his sponsor, and owner of the vessel. No doubt he was involved in the opium trade.

== The New Hebrides until 1852 ==
It was around 1841-1842 that the Paddon heard about the sandalwood in the New Hebrides (modern Vanuatu). This commodity was highly sought after by the Chinese and thus transporting it was a very lucrative activity. With the agreement of his sponsor, Paddon planned to colonize an island in the archipelago to install a depot or a trading post. He therefore brought a cargo of goods to New Zealand, the profit from the sale to finance the expedition. Paddon then held a public meeting in Wellington to announce his plans. Gathering a group of settlers including thirty lumberjacks, sixteen Chinese, and six Maori, he left Auckland on 5 October 1843 for the New Hebrides.

Without really knowing why, Paddon made a stop at Maré (one of the Loyalty Islands). But after three days, when there was no sign of it, the crew was attacked by the natives. Seventeen of his men lost their lives in the attack. Paddon managed to free himself and sailed to Norfolk Island to land two wounded, before continuing on to Newcastle (New South Wales, Australia). In his deposition in Norfolk, "he stated that he immediately stopped the fire and tried to re-establish good relations. Such a gesture was really in his character and seems accurate because the great chief Naïsseline returned to him several men who had been on the ground.

It was probably around January 1844 that the brig Brigand arrived at Inyeuc (Mystery Island), an islet in Anelguahat Bay southwest of Anatom (New Hebrides). The exposure was good, and the islet, already frequented by whalers, was considered haunted by the natives (so the security problem was solved). So Paddon decided to turn it into a trading post and bought Inyeuc without difficulty in exchange for an axe, a blanket and a thread of milking beads.

Paddon wanted to develop three activities on the islet: sandalwood, fishing (trépang and smoked fish) and a center for the supply of fresh water and food as well as for emergency repairs.

Sandalwood mining worked well. Two hundred tons of sandalwood left the island in 1847 and three ships left for China in 1848.

As early as April 1844 (three months after the installation of his trading post) an advertisement appeared in the Australian and New Zealand press: "Captain Paddon has the honour of informing the captains of whaling or merchant ships that he has a trading post on the island of Anatom, at 170° 15' east longitude and 20° 20' south latitude, where they will find fresh water to be supplied, fresh meat and vegetables as well as in all accessories necessary for navigation".

The installation of the trading post was difficult, however, because a competitor appeared less than two years after its creation: Robert Towns. Paddon never forgave him for this competition, for few whalers passed through the islet. In early 1846, Paddon learned that his sponsor, Heerjeebhoy Rustomjee, was in debt. Paddon then found a new sponsor: the firm Thacker & Co in Sydney. This contribution of new money made it possible to bring collaborators with their families, shipwrights (they made boats for travels in the archipelago), livestock in large quantities (horses, sheep ...), provisions, boats, trading goods for barter, coal. He also made it possible to buy (or build?) a cutter, the Rover's Bride, for the Sydney-Anatom route.

Paddon set up a shipyard at Anatom and most of his schooners came out of it: Governor, Rover's Bride, Master Bell, Speck, Bluebell, New Forest, Black Dog. Only the largest units, such as the 102 ton Julia Percy, were built at Parramatta.

On 14 May 1848, the Marist missionaries, expelled from Balade in New Caledonia, landed. On 29 July 1848, it was the turn of Anglican minister John Geddie and his wife. But the latter two denounced the mores of Europeans and were constantly in conflict with Paddon (who was very stubborn, and did not mince his words). Little by little, Paddon preferred the French Catholic missionaries...

As Inyeuc was gaining cruising speed, and the climate was heavy, Paddon abandoned the islet to explore the archipelagos in order to install new trading posts. In March 1850, the French missionaries, discouraged, retreated to the Isle of Pines (New Caledonia). Paddon found himself alone with Geddie, who waged open war on him. Paddon also had health problems (fevers) due to the climate, and there was no sandalwood left to exploit on the island. He left Anatom to settle in Tanna, near Erromango. He lived there with an indigenous woman of Tanna, Naitani, who was his companion until his death and with whom he had 4 daughters.

The climate of Tanna being no better than that of Anatom, he definitively left the New Hebrides in 1852 for a more "healthy" country, New Caledonia. Only two branches were maintained in Erromango and Tanna

== Then New Caledonia ==
Paddon had managed to "establish a shore team" at the Isle of Pines as early as 1846 despite the hostility of the inhabitants towards the Europeans in previous years.

It is not known exactly when Paddon discovered Bouzet Island or Nou Island (in 1843 or 1845 or later?). Still, Patton wanted to settle there but this island depended on the Gambwa, tribe of Chief Kuindo "who had already earned a sinister reputation by nibbling a few sandalwood too bold". The contacts were nevertheless encouraging.

With the discovery of the Woodin Canal in 1847 and the passage of the Havannah, Boulari Bay gained importance. It became the outlet of a shipping route to Sydney, on the east coast, and the New Hebrides. So Paddon bought Nou Island from Kuindo in exchange for barrels of fig tobacco and cloth. The settlement, episodic in 1851, on the northwest side of the island (Paddon Cove) was sheltered from the prevailing winds, near a spring. The surrounding populations used to come and barter (sandalwood, mother-of-pearl, copra, sea cucumbers, or tortoise shells for axes, nails, cloth, and especially tobacco). Little by little, the establishment took shape. It was on the peninsula facing Nou Island that the administration of the new French colony of Nouméa set up its capital, called Port-de-France, in 1854.

In 1855, Knoblauch, the chief accountant, described the facilities as "a modest straw-covered frame house serving as a store with a bedroom at each end." A store for Paddon and his family, with a room for Knoblauch, was under construction. "At the tip of Nou Island, there was a huge shed and a lime kiln." The shed contained "a steam engine, a blacksmith, carpenter's workbenches, carpenter's workbenches, and everything needed to repair ships and boats and even to build new ones. Other large masonry stores were being built to house all the products of the island and vast quantities of goods." Eighty Europeans and two hundred natives worked for Paddon. They were all housed, for the "Europeans in small houses with their wives", for the Melanesians "in huts scattered throughout Nou Island". Chinese gardeners maintained a vegetable garden to meet the needs of all this small world.

Paddon traded with all the islands of the South Seas, raising cattle, horses, sheep and pigs. To guard the animals, he employed stockmen and when necessary, erected barriers. The establishment also had two stockyards, "one for censuses and the gathering of animals, and another for butchery". The source (which was never dry even in the dry season) served the village, but also the ships of Paddon and the French Imperial Navy (because there was a lack of water in Port-de-France, the future Noumea).

Paddon had also discovered a coal mine (Morari Bay in Boulari) and traces of what he thought was gold at Mont-Dore (hence the name) which turned out to be copper pyrite. The captain sent to Australia mainly sandalwood, sea spades, or coconut oil, but also salted fish in large quantities, shark fins (very popular with the Chinese), shark skin (which replaced sandpaper) and shark liver which was an excellent oil in high demand.

Nou Island represented the headquarters of activities relayed all around the New Caledonian archipelago by trading posts. They were found on both coasts and on the Isle of Pines. The distribution was as follows: "Isle of Pines, Noumea, Nou Island, St Vincent, Urai (La Foa), Koumac, Poum, Hienghène, Balabio Island, Balade, Houaïlou and Canala".

Each time, the trading posts, "always close to the sea", were "managed by experienced men". The station consisted of "a boat (usually a whaling boat), a wooden house covered with straw, and a shed for products of all kinds... »

Paddon owned about twenty ships. From time to time, they brought the products and supplies.

On Paddon's advice, the trading post managers eatablished native women from the area where they settled as their de facto wives. An exchange trade was established: sandalwood, sea spades, tortoise shells, coconut oil against poultry, ducks, domestic pigs, dogs, fig tobacco, tools or bearer notes.

For fishing for sea spades, the natives settled on islets, built huts and sheds. Paddon provided the pots to boil the animals. The captain insisted on the size of the spades to avoid their disappearance. When the animals were dry, the natives brought them to the station.

The good understanding between the Melanesians and the depot managers, both from trade and relational connections established by taking Melenesian women as de facto wives, and the good reputation of Paddon with the tribes facilitated the French settlement.

It was upon discovering Paddon's installation on Nou Island that Tardy de Montravel decided to establish the capital of the colony in Port-de-France. Paddon quickly understood all the advantage he could draw from such a situation. So he brought fifty head of cattle from Sydney. His experience enabled him to organize a postal service with Sydney, recruit native labour for work in Port-de-France, improve relations with native chiefs, and point out the location of the coal deposits.

On 30 March 1855 30 Paddon obtained a five-year grant from 1 April 1855 1er for the part of Nou Island which he occupied in gratitude for his services. However, he was not allowed to exploit wood except to be used for fuel.

Paddon had already set up additionsl operations in Païta on Kuindo's land for breeding and cultivation trials.

Little by little, an Anglophobic sentiment developed among the French, Sydney being against the French presence, and Paddon, very strong since he had the monopoly of commercial activities on the island. Feeling the tide turning, he sold Nou Island for 40,000 francs in cash in 1857. On 12 December 1858, he obtained, on condition of accelerated development with the arrival of twenty-two settlers within five years, 4,000 hectares of land for cultivation in the basins of the two rivers Kari-Kouyé and Katiramona with a narrow strip of land going as far as Dumbéa Bay.

He first brought fourteen people (Antoine and Hélène Metzger and their sons Frantz and Theodore, Antoine's sister, Catherine Human and her husband, Henrich and Maria Ohlen and their son Henri, Charles John Frédéric Gaertner and wife, and Thomas and Rachel Lynch and their daughter) from Sydney by the brig Speck in May 1859. These Paddon settlers received twenty hectares of land in free ownership after five years. A total of eighteen settlers (including Messrs. Abel, James, Ambrose, Sleath, Rey, Riese, Cheneval, Blair, Jouenne, Thorburn) of the twenty-two planned settlers settled. Three parcels returned to the public domain but the concession title became final.

Paddon transformed himself into a gentleman farmer. On 16 December 1859 he was a member of the colony's first agricultural committee.

Paddon died on 13 February 1861 13 of untreated chest inflammation on Nou Island. He was first buried in Port-de-France. His remains were then transferred on 9 February 1866, on the property of Païta, to Gadji, at the request of the family and settlers he had introduced. They financed the mausoleum commissioned in Australia that was erected for him. James Paddon & Cie was liquidated by his partner Charles Edwards. The objects, furniture, goods and livestock that belonged to the company were sold between July and August 1861. 16 November.

== Tributes ==
- A school in Païta (New Caledonia) bears his name..
- The villa-museum of Païta is dedicated to the "Paddon settlers".
- The funerary monument of James Paddon is part of the List of Historic Monuments of the South Province (New Caledonia) since 2012.

== Sources ==
- Biographical information is based on a translation from an equivalent article at the French Wikipedia.
