= William Silas Pearse (minister) =

William Silas Pearse BA (c. 1869 – 17 August 1949) was a Congregational minister in Victoria, Australia. At his death he was reckoned one of the oldest Congregational Church ministers in Victoria.

== History ==
Pearse was born in Richmond, Victoria and grew up in Fremantle, Western Australia, son of Martha Pearse (c. 1845–1922) and Samuel Pearse (c. 1845–1919) later of Beaconsfield, Western Australia. He was educated in Adelaide at Whinham College and the University of Adelaide. In 1894 he was ordained at both Stow Church and the Congregational Church, Bordertown, where he held a pastorates, then Broken Hill from January 1899 to May 1901.

Then came an unexplained change of plan. He was reported as removing to Brisbane, specifically to Milton, but was somewhat later installed at Yarrawonga, Victoria. And a later summary had him in Kadina before moving to Victoria, when in fact it was the brief period September to December 1913 after a European holiday.

In Victoria his pastorates were Yarrawonga, Maryborough, Chelsea, Gardiner, Ascot Vale, and from May 1939 to the time of his death was minister of the East St Kilda Congregational Church.

He was chairman of the Congregational Union of Victoria for the year 1927–28.

He was a Congregationalist delegate to the Council of Churches in Victoria and twice elected president of the Council; and in 1925 stepped in when Frank Paton, was forced by ill-health to step down. He transferred to the Ascot Vale church in April 1925, and to East St Kilda in 1941.

He died in St Vincent's Hospital, aged 80.

== Family ==
Pearse married Eliza Alice Wells (1866 – 2 February 1930), daughter of W. E. Wells of Albert Park, Victoria, on 24 November 1897.

- Erica Mary Victoria Pearse (11 January 1901 – )
- Rev. Leonard Silas Pearse (1909– ), of Camberwell Congregational Church, married Amy Kelly on 14 December 1935.

Their address in 1935 was 36 Eglinton Street, Moonee Ponds.
