= George Whitecross Paton =

Australian legal scholar

Sir George Whitecross Paton
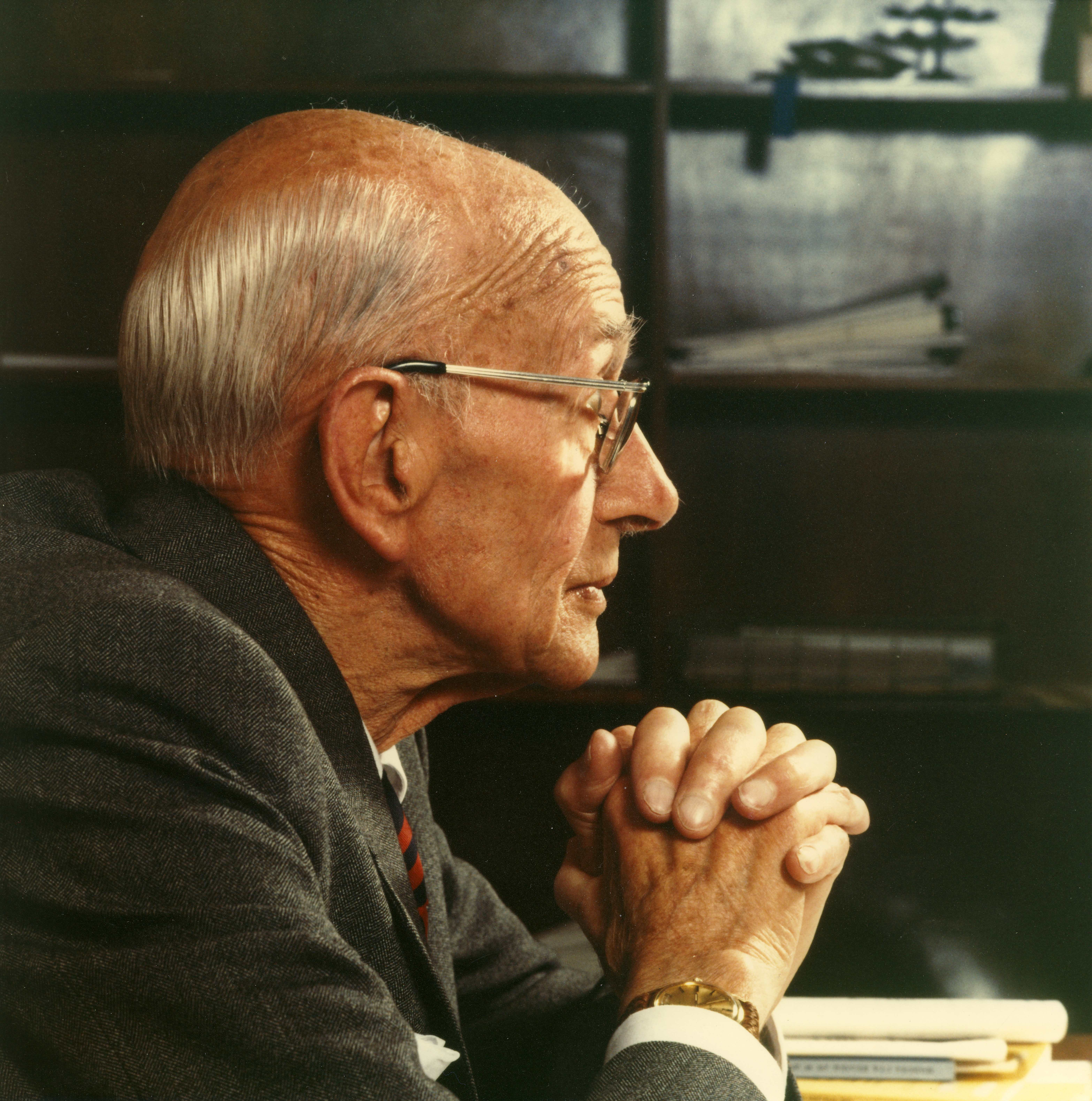
- Born: 16 August 1902; Geelong, Victoria
- Died: 16 June 1985 (aged 82)
- Education: Scotch College, Melbourne (1914-1920); Melbourne University (1921-1925); Magdalen College, Oxford (1926-1929)
- Parent(s): Clara Sophia Heyer; Frank Hume Lyall Paton
- Relatives: John Gibson Paton (paternal grandfather)

Sir George Whitecross Paton (16 August 1902 – 16 June 1985) was an Australian legal scholar and Vice-Chancellor of Melbourne University from 1951 until 1968.

== Early life and education ==
Paton was born on 16 August 1902 at Grovedale, near Geelong, Victoria. His parents were Frank Hume Lyall Paton (son of John Gibson Paton) and Clara Sophia Heyer. He was educated at Scotch College, Melbourne (1914–1920), and then Melbourne University (1921–1925) where he was resident at Ormond College. He won the Rhodes Scholarship for Victoria (Australia) in 1925, which allowed him to continue his studies at Magdalen College, Oxford, from 1926 to 1929.

He married Alice Watson (1905–1994) on 11 July 1931 and they had four children.

== Academic life ==
Paton became a barrister-at-law in 1927 and lectured in law at the London School of Economics. In 1931 he was appointed Professor of Jurisprudence at the University of Melbourne and became dean of the Faculty of Law in 1943. In 1951 he was appointed vice-chancellor of Melbourne University and held the position until his retirement in 1968. After retirement he was president of the Australian and New Zealand Society of Criminology Inc. (ANZSOC) from 1969 to 1971

== Major publication ==
Paton's major published work, A Text-Book of Jurisprudence, appeared in 1946 and went through further editions. It won the Swiney Prize, a British award for works on jurisprudence. In Australia and elsewhere, it was (in one reviewer's words) "to many students the text-book of jurisprudence".

== Royal Commission on Television in Australia (1953-1954) ==
On 5 February 1953, Paton was appointed Chairman of the Royal Commission on Television in Australia. Other members of the commission were C.B. Bednall, Mrs. Maud Foxton, R.G. Osborne, R.C. Wilson and N.S. Young. Its object was to enable Australia to profit from the experience of other countries in introducing and controlling television. The enquiry considered the numbers of national and commercial channels to be established, the economics involved and standards to be observed.
