= Talua Theological Training Institute =

- Former names: Talua Ministry Training Centre
- Established: 1986
- Principal: Ps Philip Baniuri
- Students: 67 (2001)
- Location: Vanuatu; 15.582°S 167.014°E
- Website: www.ttti.edu.vu

Talua Theological Training Institute, formerly known as Talua Ministry Training Centre, is a Bible College in Vanuatu, run by the Presbyterian Church of Vanuatu. It is located near Luganville on the island of Espiritu Santo.

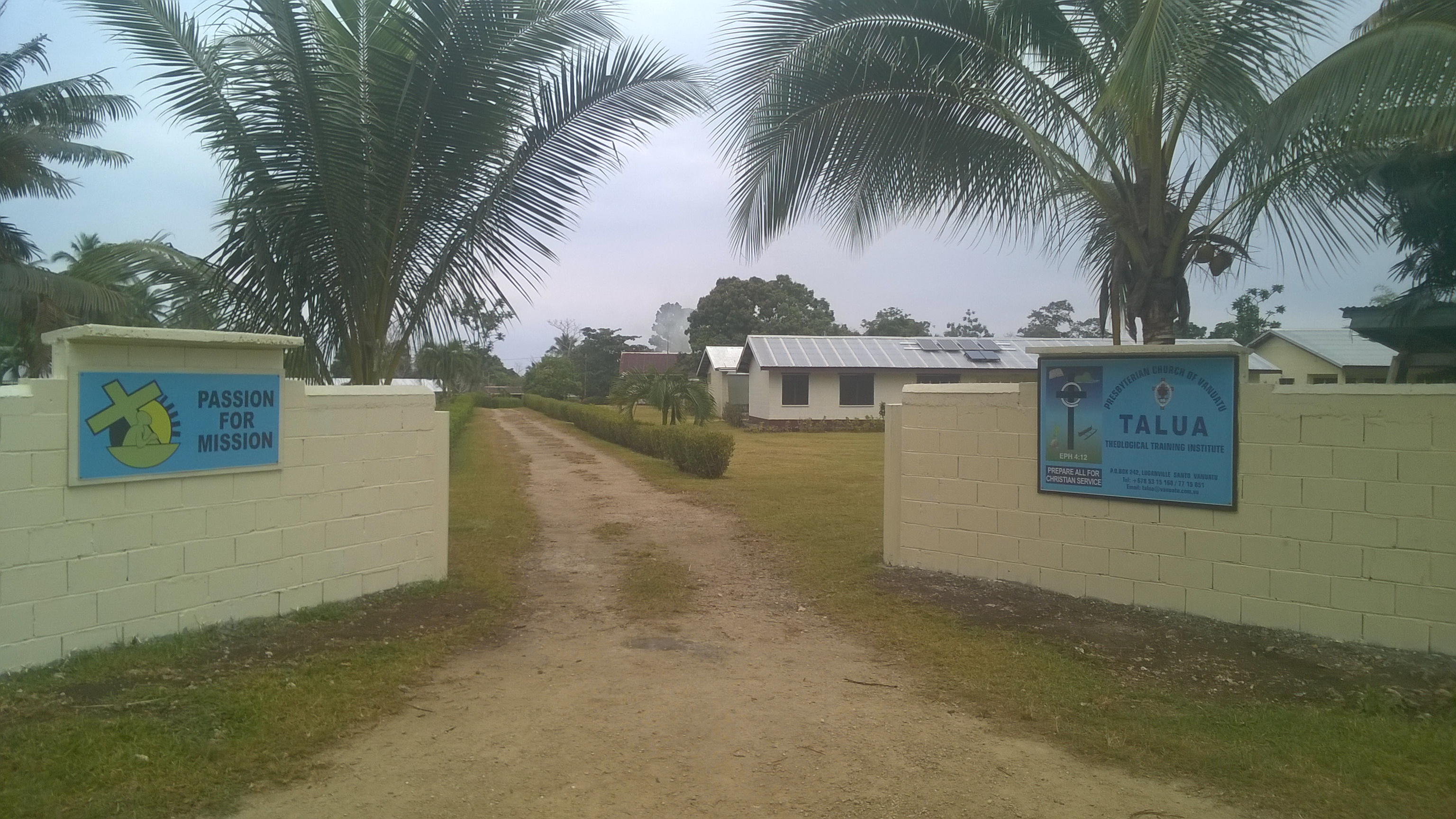
The entrance to Talua

Talua was established in 1986 as an amalgamation of the Presbyterian Bible College on the island of Tangoa, and the Aulua Theological Training Centre on the island of Malekula. The name Talua comes from TAngoa and AuLUA.

Talua offers a Diploma in Theology course accredited by the South Pacific Association of Theological Schools, as well as a Bachelor of Ministry degree accredited by the Asia Theological Association.

In 2001, the enrolment was 67 full-time students. The college is residential, with all staff and students living on campus. As of 2025, the principal is Pastor Philip Baniuri.

Classes are officially in English, but often "revert to Bislama when discussing deep concepts".

Talua suffered extensive damage from Cyclone Harold in April 2020.
