= Aniwa (island) =

- Island
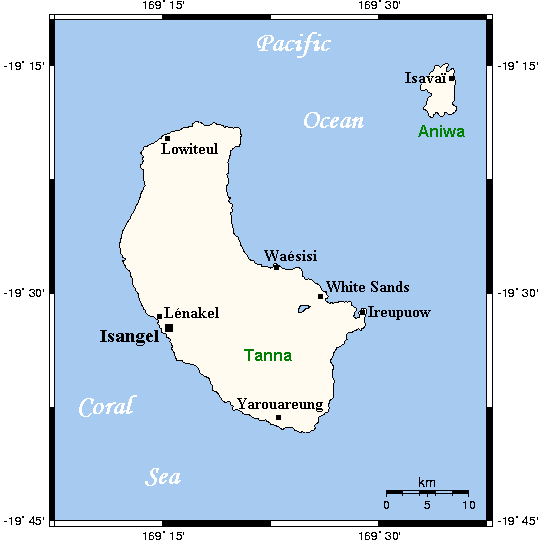
- Map of Tanna and Aniwa, with Aniwa at the top right

- Location in Vanuatu
- Coordinates: 19°15′10″S 169°35′59″E
- Country: Vanuatu
- Province: Tafea Province

Area
  - Total: 8 km^{2} (3.1 sq mi)
- Elevation: 42 m (138 ft)

Population (2009)
  - Total: 341
  - Density: 43/km^{2} (110/sq mi)
- Time zone: UTC+11 (VUT)

Aniwa is a small island in the southernmost province of Tafea, Vanuatu.

As a coral island (a raised coral atoll), it rises a mere 42 m above sea level. In the northwest is Itcharo (Tiaro) lagoon, which is open to the sea. The nearest large island is Tanna, about 24 km to the southwest.

== History ==
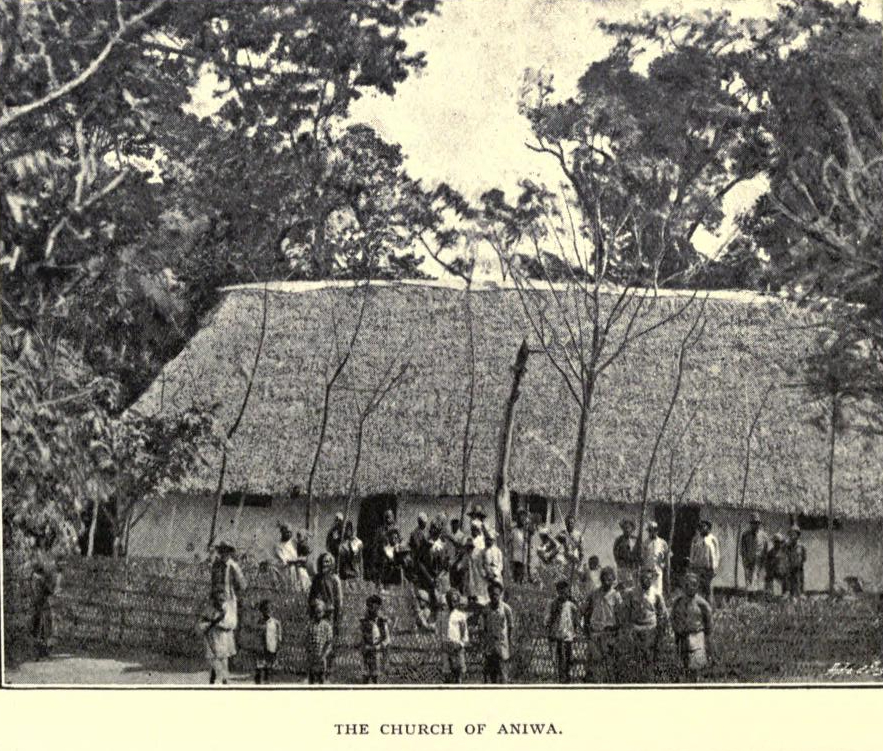
The church at Aniwa

In the 1840 missionaries arrived. In 1866 John Gibson Paton and his new wife Margaret Paton arrived on the island. He had been a missionary on Tanna but he was involved with encouraging the British to make a punitive mission there so he was persona non grata. They were now successful missionaries of the Presbyterian Church of Victoria and over the next fifteen years all of the 200 inhabitants identified as Christians.

== Population ==
Like the nearby West Futuna, it is a Polynesian outlier, and thus its inhabitants originally came from Samoa, and the Wallis and Futuna group instead of the Melanesians of other nearby islands, although there has been much intermarriage with Tanna over the generations. The language of both islands is Futunan, in the Futunic branch of Nuclear Polynesian languages, though the dialects between the two islands are distinct. Population is about 350 in five distinct villages:

1. Itangutu
2. Imalé
3. Isavaï
4. Ikaokao
5. Namsafoura

The main village is Ikaokao, located in the centre of the south of the island, followed by Isavai in the islands' centre. The John Frum cargo cult exists in Ikaokao, and is unaffected by the touristic involvement that has modified the cult in Tanna.

== Transportation ==
The island is served by Aniwa Airport, an air strip in the north with flights from Port Vila twice a week.

Anchorage is challenging in 20m on the west coast of the island, identifiable by a white square painted onto the coral face. Shipping of goods or passengers is by either the monthly interisland shipping service or the numerous small outboard motor boats operated by individuals.

A road accessible to vehicles links almost all parts of the island.
