= Margaret Paton =

British missionary (1841–1905)

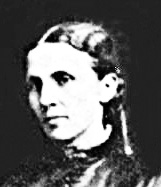
- Born: Margaret Whitecross; 18 April 1841; Prestonpans, Scotland
- Died: 16 May 1905 (aged 64); Kew, Victoria
- Other name: "Maggie"
- Known for: missionary
- Spouse: John Gibson Paton

Margaret Paton born Maggie Whitecross (18 April 1841 – 16 May 1905) was a British missionary to the New Hebrides. She founded the Presbyterian Women's Missionary Union.

== Life ==
Paton was born in 1841 in Prestonpans in Scotland. Her father was the Rev. John Whitecross.

On 17 June 1864 she married John Gibson Paton who had returned the year before from the New Hebrides where he had been a missionary. She was his second wife. In the same year, her husband was elected to be the moderator of the Reformed Presbyterian Church of Scotland. In 1865 they arrived back in the New Hebrides where her husband arranged for a punitive mission by the British on the people of Tanna where he had previously been based.

This made a return to Tanna impossible so they set up a new base on the small island of Aniwa funded by the Presbyterian Church of Victoria. They were not the first missionaries there but they were the most successful. During the fifteen years that they were on the island, the whole of the population identified as Christian. This was about 200 people.

They had twin sons named Alec Wilson and Willie McGregor but they died as infants. They had five sons who survived including Frank Paton who was born in 1870.

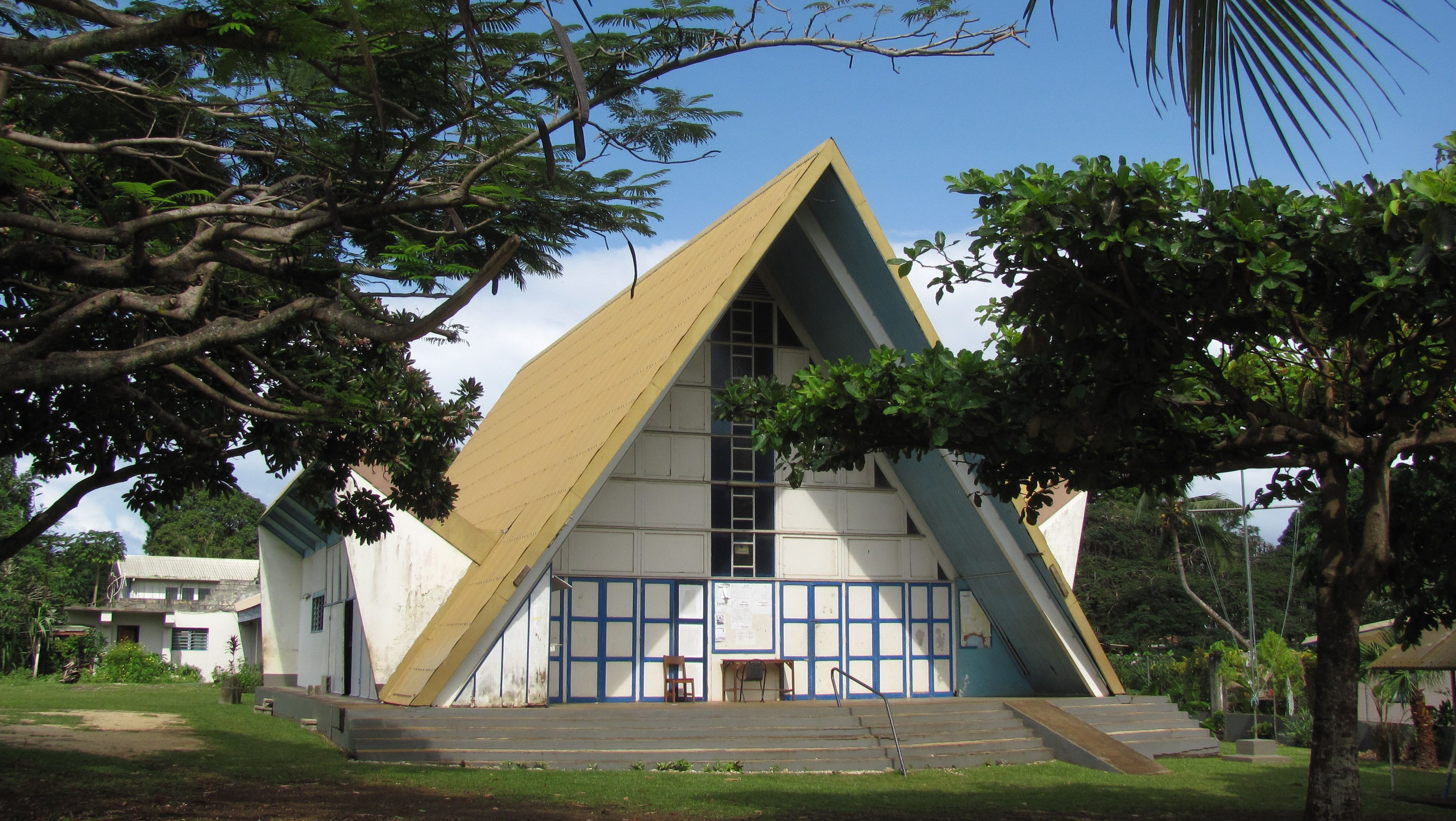
Paton Memorial Church in Port Vila.

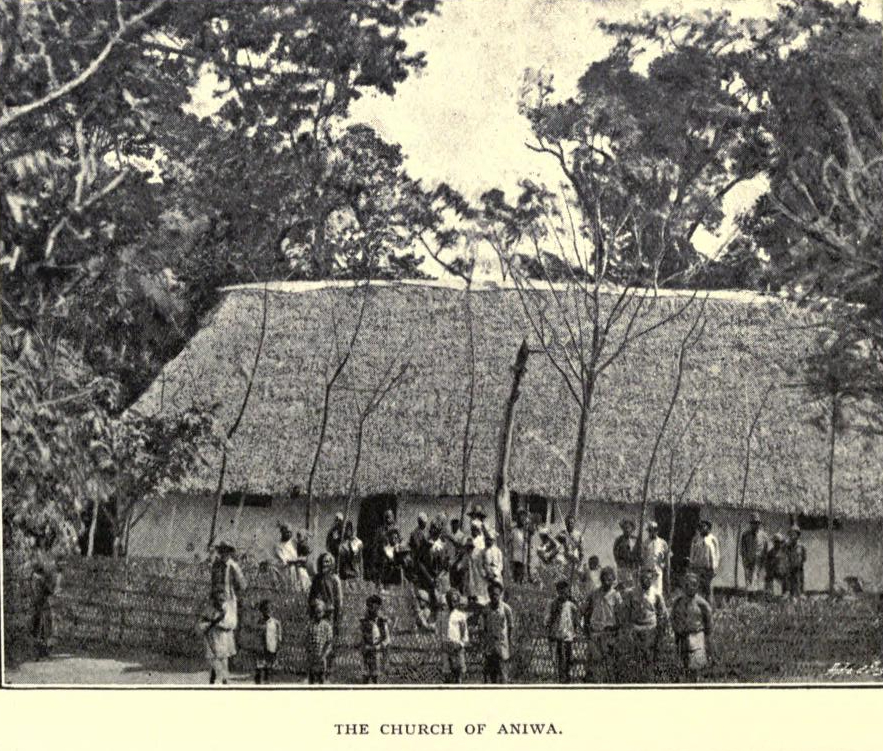
The church at Aniwa

In November 1869 she wrote home telling them that their church was now formally constituted. Moreover, about a dozen natives came to be baptised in the church.

In 1894 her book, "Letters and Sketches from the South Seas", was published. The book is made up from twenty letters that she wrote to people she knew back in Scotland starting in 1865. The letters were not written in preparation for publication.

Paton died in Kew in 1905. She was survived by her husband, who was buried beside her two years later. Their gravestone also records their twins sons and John Whitecross Paton who was born in 1880 and lived until 1962. Two churches were named in her memory: The Paton Memorial Church in Port Vila and another in Korea.
