= George N. Gordon =

Canadian missionary

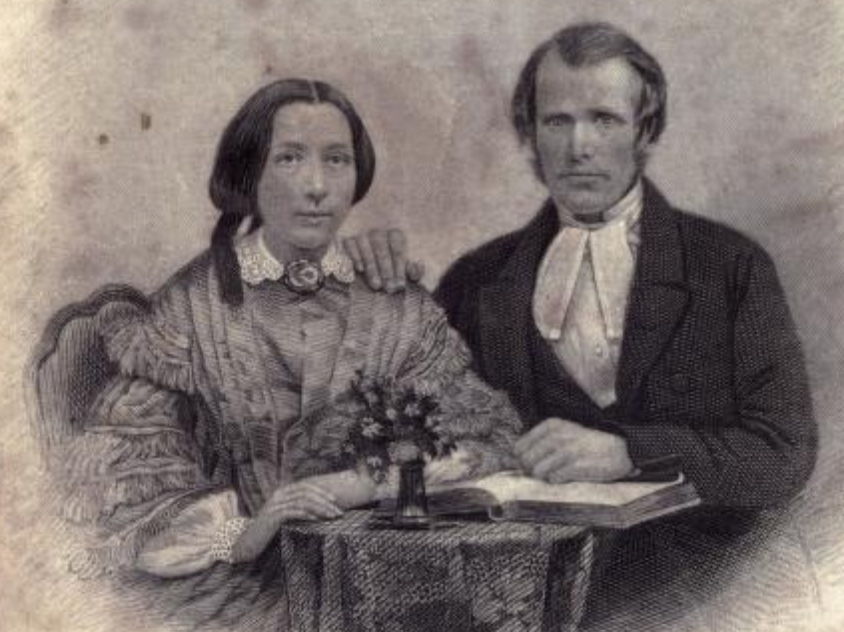
- Rev. George N. Gordon and Ellen Catherine Powell, his wife
- Born: April 21, 1822; Alberton, Prince Edward Island
- Died: May 20, 1861 (aged 39); Erromango
- Spouse: Ellen Catherine Powell
- Relatives: James Gordon (brother)

Signature
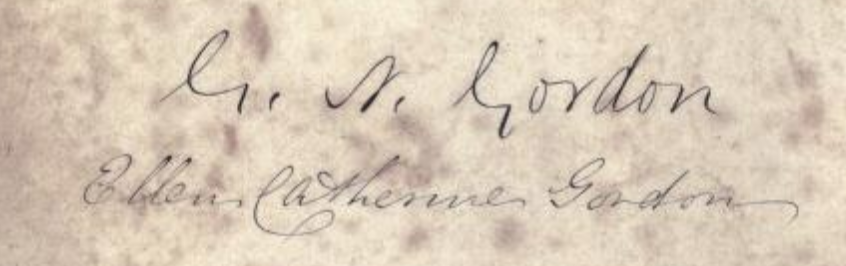

George Nicol Gordon (April 21, 1822 – May 20, 1861) was a Protestant Canadian missionary to the Pacific Islands. Due to the murder of Gordon and his wife, Ellen (1833 - May 20, 1861), they are considered by many to be martyrs of modern times.

George Gordon was born to John Gordon and Mary Ramsay, both of Scottish ancestry near Alberton, Prince Edward Island. In 1848 he was converted to Christianity and began distributing Bibles and religious tracts. In 1850, he attended Presbyterian Theological Hall in West River, Nova Scotia. Gordon began his missionary work in Halifax City Mission where he would minister to the poor about the gospel of Christ.

He arrived on the coast of Erromango, an island near Vanuatu, in the Pacific Ocean, in June 1857 to evangelize among the natives. About forty natives of Erromango were converted to Christianity. However, in March 1861 sandalwood traders intentionally exposed the natives to measles, and Gordon spent most of his time caring for them, however, the two children of one of the island's chiefs had died in his care, and the chief thought that he had put a spell on his children, he banded together a group of warriors and killed both George and his wife on May 20, 1861.

Gordon's younger brother James followed him to Erromango, and was also martyred, in 1872.
