= Tangoa (island) =

- Island
- Location in Vanuatu
- Coordinates: 15.59°S 166.99°E
- Country: Vanuatu
- Province: Sanma Province

Population (2009)
  - Total: 394
- Time zone: UTC+11 (VUT)

Tangoa is an island in Vanuatu, in the Pacific Ocean. It is located off the southern coast of Vanuatu's largest island Espiritu Santo in Sanma Province. The local inhabitants speak the Tangoa language.

== Education ==
The Teachers' Training Institute (later renamed the Tangoa Training Institute) operated on the island from 1895 to 1970, when the Presbyterian Church of Vanuatu established a Presbyterian Bible College there. This operated from 1971 to 1986, when it merged with the Aulua Theological Training Centre to form the Talua Ministry Training Centre.
