= A. K. Langridge =

British missionary (1857–1938)

Albert Kent Langridge (1857 – 2 October 1938) was a British missionary and writer, best known as co-author of several biographies of John Gibson Paton.

== History ==
Langridge was born in London in 1857 and baptised in Kirkby Wharfe, Yorkshire. In 1880, he, his parents, and his eight siblings were living in Kendall County, Texas on a farm.

He worked as a General Post Office employee and friend and honorary secretary to John G. Paton, noted Presbyterian missionary in the New Hebrides (now Vanuatu).

He founded the John G. Paton Mission Fund in October 1890 and operated it from Britain as a supportive body, sending out personnel, equipment, launches and building several small hospitals. Paton was consulted only after the project was established and he had no control over its funds.

He was an informant in Vanuatu to the UK Government on the abuses perpetrated by "blackbirders" on Kanaka laborers employed in sugar cane harvesting in Queensland.

In 1906 was living at "Aniwa", Crowstone Road, Southend-on-Sea, Essex.

== Bibliography ==
- The Story of Dr. John G. Paton's Thirty Years with South Seas Cannibals by Rev. James Paton (1843–1907), revised by A. K. Langridge
- John G. Paton, an Autobiography by A. K. Langridge and Frank H. L. Paton (1870–1938), 1889
- John G. Paton: Later Years and Farewell; A Sequel to John G. Paton, an Autobiography by A. K. Langridge, London 1910
- Won by blood: the story of Erromanga, the martyr isle by A. K. Langridge
- Britain and France in the New Hebrides Islands, S. W. Pacific: Arguments for Sole Control to Pass to British Empire by A. K. Langridge
- Source Book: John G. Paton, King of the Cannibals by A. K. Langridge. Baptist Board of Education, Madison Avenue, New York City.
- The Queensland Kanaka Traffic since 1885 by A. K. Langridge. Hazell, Watson & Viney, London 1892
- The Conquest of Cannibal Tanna: A Brief Record of Christian Persistency in the New Hebrides Islands by A. K. Langridge.
